= Comparison of phytocannabinoids =

Cannabinoids (/kəˈnæbənɔɪdzˌ ˈkænəbənɔɪdz/) are compounds found in the cannabis plant or synthetic compounds that can interact with the endocannabinoid system. The most notable cannabinoid is the phytocannabinoid tetrahydrocannabinol (THC) (Delta-9-THC), the primary intoxicating compound in cannabis. Cannabidiol (CBD) is another major constituent of some cannabis plants. Conversion of CBD to THC can occur when CBD is heated to temperatures between 250–300 °C (480 to 570°F), potentially leading to its partial transformation into THC.

At least 113 distinct cannabinoids have been isolated from cannabis. This article gives comparative structures of some of the more common natural and synthetic cannabinoids, as well as showing structures of legally banned and sanctioned cannabinoids.

== Structures ==
Cannabinoid	2D Structure	3D Structure
CBC		
CBCV		
CBD		
CBDD		
CBDH		
CBDO		
CBDP		
CBDV		
CBE		
CBG		
CBGV		
CBL		
CBN		
CBND		
CBTC		
CBV		
delta-3-THC		
delta-4-THC		
delta-7-THC		
delta-8-THC		
delta-10-THC		
delta-11-THC		
THC		
THCC		
THCB		
THCH		
THCP		
THCV		

== Legality ==
Cannabinoid	Quasi-psychedelic	Drug precursor	Legal status
CBCA, CBC			Legal in most countries
CBCVA, CBCV			
CBDA, CBD	No	THC	See Cannabidiol § Legal status
CBDD			
CBDH			
CBDO			
CBDPA, CBDP			
CBDVA, CBDV			
CBEA, CBE			
CBGA, CBG			
CBGVA, CBGV			
CBLA, CBL			
CBNA, CBN			
CBNDA, CBND			
CBTA, CBT			
CBVA, CBV			
delta-3-THC	Yes		Legal in most countries
delta-4-THC	Yes		Legal in most countries
delta-7-THC	Yes		Legal in most countries
delta-8-THC	Yes		Legal in most countries
delta-10-THC	Yes		Legal in most countries
delta-11-THC	Yes		Legal in most countries
THCA, THC	Yes		UN Convention on Psychotropic Substances
THCB			
THCCA, THCC			
THCH	Yes		Legal in most countries
THCPA, THCP	Yes		Legal in most countries
THCVA, THCV			

== Thermal properties ==
=== Conversion temperatures ===
Cyclization reaction	Temperature
CBD → THC	250 °C (482 °F) to 300 °C (572 °F)

=== Decarboxylation temperatures ===
All cannabinoids listed here and their acids are found naturally in the plant to varying degrees.

Decarboxylation reaction	Temperature
CBCA → CBC	
CBCVA → CBCV	
CBDA → CBD	
CBDPA → CBDP	
CBDVA → CBDV	
CBEA → CBE	
CBGA → CBG	
CBGVA → CBGV	
CBLA → CBL	
CBNA → CBN	
CBNDA → CBND	
CBTA → CBT	
CBVA → CBV	
THCA → THC	230 °F (110 °C) to 250 °F (121 °C)
THCCA → THCC	
THCPA → THCP	
THCVA → THCV	

Upon heating, cannabinoid acids decarboxylate to give their psychoactive cannabinoid. For example, Delta-9-tetrahydrocannabinol (THC) is the main psychoactive compound found in cannabis and is responsible for the "high" feeling when consumed. However, cannabis does not naturally contain significant amounts of THC. Instead, tetrahydrocannabinolic acid (THCA) is found naturally in raw and live cannabis and is non-intoxicating. Over time, THCA slowly converts to THC through a process of decarboxylation over the course of roughly a year, but can be sped up with exposure to high temperatures. When heated under conditions of 110 °C, decarboxylation generally occurs in 30–45 minutes. The decarboxylated THCA (THC) is added to cannabis edibles, as THCA is not orally active. When consumed orally, the liver breaks down and metabolizes THC into the more potent 11-hydroxy-THC.

=== Vaporization temperatures ===
Dry-herb vaporizers can be used to inhale cannabis in its flower form. There are 483 identifiable chemical constituents known to exist in the cannabis plant, and at least 85 different cannabinoids have been isolated from the plant. The aromatic terpenoids begin to vaporize at 126.0 °C (258.8 °F), but the more bioactive tetrahydrocannabinol (THC), and other cannabinoids also found in cannabis (often legally sold as cannabinoid isolates) like cannabidiol (CBD), cannabichromene (CBC), cannabigerol (CBG), cannabinol (CBN), do not vaporize until near their respective boiling points.

The cannabinoids listed here are found in the plant but only in trace amounts. However, they have also been extracted and sold as isolates online. Third party certification may help ensure buyers to avoid synthetic cannabinoids.

Cannabinoid	Boiling point
CBC	220 °C (428 °F)
CBCV	
CBD	160 °C (320 °F)-180 °C (356 °F)
CBDD	?
CBDO	
CBDP	
CBDV	
CBE	
CBG	185 °C (365 °F)
CBGV	
CBL	
CBN	185 °C (365 °F)
CBT	
CBV	
delta-3-THC	?
delta-4-THC	?
delta-7-THC	?
delta-8-THC	175 °C (347 °F)-178 °C (352 °F)
delta-10-THC	?
delta-11-THC	?
THC	157 °C (315 °F)
THCB	
THCC	
THCP	
THCV	<220

== Structural scheduling ==
Table of plant cannabinoids
Cannabigerol-type (CBG)
Cannabigerol (E)-CBG-C_{5}	Cannabigerol monomethyl ether (E)-CBGM-C_{5} A	Cannabinerolic acid A (Z)-CBGA-C_{5} A	Cannabigerovarin (E)-CBGV-C_{3}	
Cannabigerolic acid A (E)-CBGA-C_{5} A	Cannabigerolic acid A monomethyl ether (E)-CBGAM-C_{5} A		Cannabigerovarinic acid A (E)-CBGVA-C_{3} A	
Cannabichromene-type (CBC)
(±)-Cannabichromene; CBC-C_{5}	(±)-Cannabichromenic acid A CBCA-C_{5} A	(±)-Cannabivarichromene, (±)-Cannabichromevarin; CBCV-C_{3}	(±)-Cannabichromevarinic acid A CBCVA-C_{3} A	
Cannabidiol-type (CBD)
(−)-Cannabidiol; CBD-C_{5}	Cannabidiol momomethyl ether CBDM-C_{5}	Cannabidiol-C_{4} CBD-C_{4}	(−)-Cannabidivarin; CBDV-C_{3}	Cannabidiorcol; CBD-C_{1}
Cannabidiolic acid CBDA-C_{5}			Cannabidivarinic acid CBDVA-C_{3}	
Cannabinodiol-type (CBND)
Cannabinodiol; CBND-C_{5}	Cannabinodivarin; CBND-C_{3}			
Tetrahydrocannabinol-type (THC)
Δ^{9}-Tetrahydrocannabinol; Δ^{9}-THC-C_{5}		Δ^{9}-Tetrahydrocannabinol-C_{4} Δ^{9}-THC-C_{4}	Δ^{9}-Tetrahydrocannabivarin; Δ^{9}-THCV-C_{3}	Δ^{9}-Tetrahydrocannabiorcol; Δ^{9}-THCO-C_{1}
Δ^{9}-Tetrahydro- cannabinolic acid A Δ^{9}-THCA-C_{5} A	Δ^{9}-Tetrahydro- cannabinolic acid B Δ^{9}-THCA-C_{5} B	Δ^{9}-Tetrahydro- cannabinolic acid-C_{4} A and/or B Δ^{9}-THCA-C_{4} A and/or B	Δ^{9}-Tetrahydro- cannabivarinic acid A Δ^{9}-THCVA-C_{3} A	Δ^{9}-Tetrahydro- cannabiorcolic acid A and/or B Δ^{9}-THCOA-C_{1} A and/or B
(−)-Δ^{8}-trans-(6aR,10aR)- Δ^{8}-Tetrahydrocannabinol; Δ^{8}-THC-C_{5}	(−)-Δ^{8}-trans-(6aR,10aR)- Tetrahydrocannabinolic acid A Δ^{8}-THCA-C_{5} A	(−)-(6aS,10aR)-Δ^{9}- Tetrahydrocannabinol (−)-cis-Δ^{9}-THC-C_{5}		
Cannabinol-type (CBN)
Cannabinol; CBN-C_{5}	Cannabinol-C_{4} CBN-C_{4}	Cannabivarin; CBN-C_{3}	Cannabinol-C_{2} CBN-C_{2}	Cannabiorcol; CBN-C_{1}
Cannabinolic acid A CBNA-C_{5} A	Cannabinol methyl ether CBNM-C_{5}			
Cannabitriol-type (CBT)
(−)-(9R,10R)-trans- Cannabitriol (−)-trans-CBT-C_{5}	(+)-(9S,10S)-Cannabitriol (+)-trans-CBT-C_{5}	(±)-(9R,10S/9S,10R)- Cannabitriol (±)-cis-CBT-C_{5}	(−)-(9R,10R)-trans- 10-O-Ethyl-cannabitriol (−)-trans-CBT-OEt-C_{5}	(±)-(9R,10R/9S,10S)- Cannabitriol-C_{3} (±)-trans-CBT-C_{3}
8,9-Dihydroxy-Δ^{6a(10a)}- tetrahydrocannabinol 8,9-Di-OH-CBT-C_{5}	Cannabidiolic acid A cannabitriol ester CBDA-C_{5} 9-OH-CBT-C_{5} ester	(−)-(6aR,9S,10S,10aR)- 9,10-Dihydroxy- hexahydrocannabinol, Cannabiripsol; Cannabiripsol-C_{5}	(−)-6a,7,10a-Trihydroxy- Δ^{9}-tetrahydrocannabinol (−)-Cannabitetrol	10-Oxo-Δ^{6a(10a)}- tetrahydrocannabinol OTHC
Cannabielsoin-type (CBE)
(5aS,6S,9R,9aR)- Cannabielsoin; CBE-C_{5}		(5aS,6S,9R,9aR)- C_{3}-Cannabielsoin; CBE-C_{3}		
(5aS,6S,9R,9aR)- Cannabielsoic acid A CBEA-C_{5} A	(5aS,6S,9R,9aR)- Cannabielsoic acid B CBEA-C_{5} B	(5aS,6S,9R,9aR)- C_{3}-Cannabielsoic acid B CBEA-C_{3} B		
Cannabiglendol-C_{3} OH-iso-HHCV-C_{3}	Dehydrocannabifuran; DCBF-C_{5}	Cannabifuran; CBF-C_{5}		
Isocannabinoids
(−)-Δ^{7}-trans-(1R,3R,6R)- Isotetrahydrocannabinol	(±)-Δ^{7}-1,2-cis- (1R,3R,6S/1S,3S,6R)- Isotetrahydro- cannabivarin	(−)-Δ^{7}-trans-(1R,3R,6R)- Isotetrahydrocannabivarin		
Cannabicyclol-type (CBL)
(±)-(1aS,3aR,8bR,8cR)- Cannabicyclol; CBL-C_{5}	(±)-(1aS,3aR,8bR,8cR)- Cannabicyclolic acid A CBLA-C_{5} A	(±)-(1aS,3aR,8bR,8cR)- Cannabicyclovarin; CBLV-C_{3}		
Cannabicitran-type (CBT)
Cannabicitran; CBT-C_{5}				
Cannabichromanone-type (CBCN)
Cannabichromanone; CBCN-C_{5}	Cannabichromanone-C_{3} CBCN-C_{3}	Cannabicoumaronone; CBCON-C_{5}		
