= C21H30O2 =

The molecular formula C_{21}H_{30}O_{2} (molar mass: 314.46 g/mol) may refer to:

== Cannabinoid ==
- Abnormal cannabidiol
- Cannabichromene
- Cannabicitran
- Cannabicyclol
- Cannabidiol
- Cis-THC
- Delta-6-Cannabidiol
- Isotetrahydrocannabinol
- Tetrahydrocannabinol
- Delta-3-Tetrahydrocannabinol
- Delta-4-Tetrahydrocannabinol
- Delta-7-Tetrahydrocannabinol
- Delta-8-Tetrahydrocannabinol
- Delta-10-Tetrahydrocannabinol

== Steroid ==
- 17α-Allyl-19-nortestosterone
- 20α-Dihydrodydrogesterone
- 5α-Dihydrolevonorgestrel
- 5α-Dihydroethisterone
- Ethinylandrostenediol
- Hydroxytibolones
  - 3α-Hydroxytibolone
  - 3β-Hydroxytibolone
- 17α-Methyl-19-norprogesterone
- Metynodiol
- Progesterone
- Retroprogesterone
- Vinyltestosterone
