= Δ11-Tetrahydrocannabinol =

Isomer of tetrahydrocannabinol

Δ^{11}-Tetrahydrocannabinol
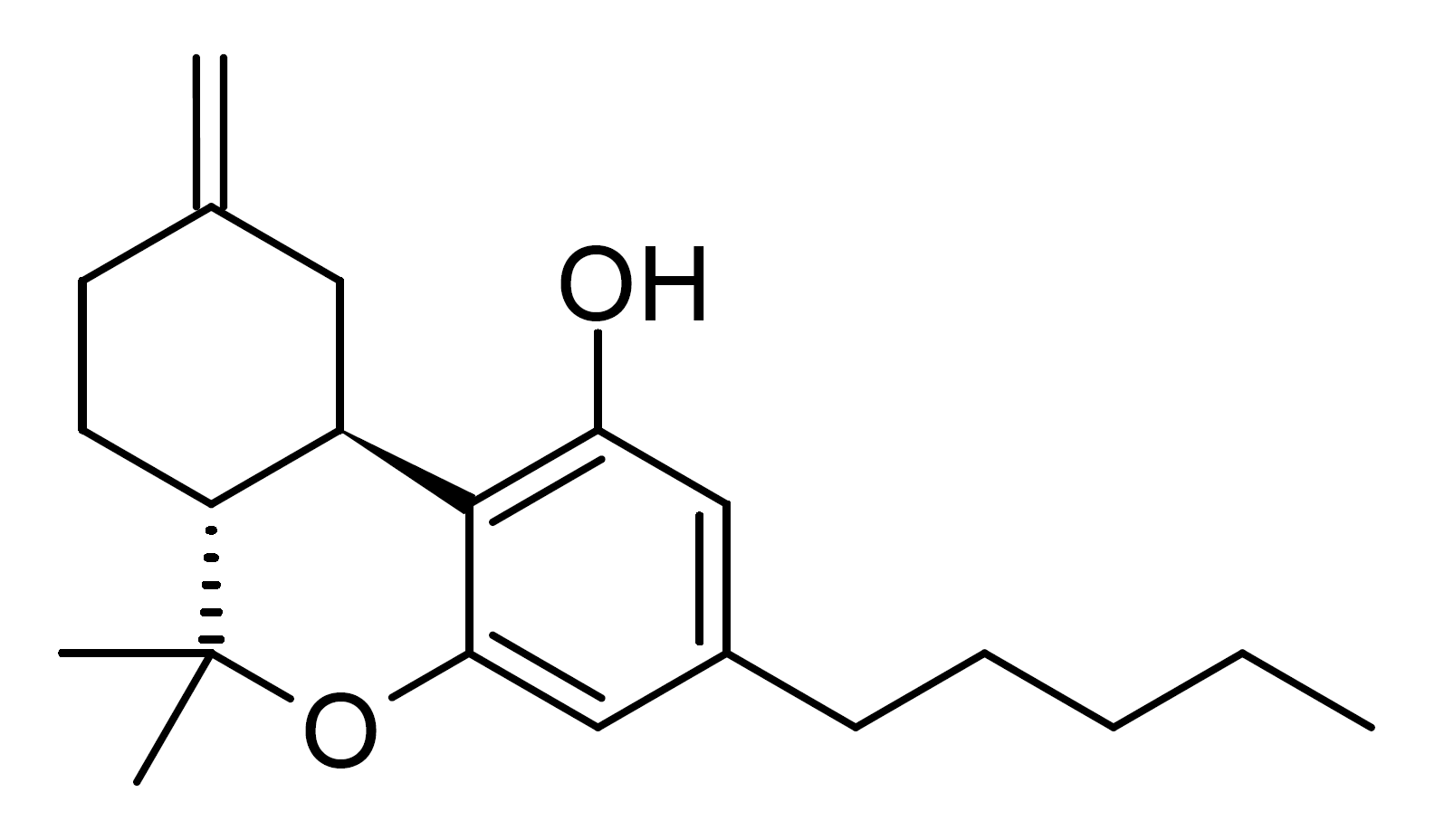

Clinical data
- Other names: Delta-11-THC, Exo-THC, Δ^{11}-THC, Δ^{9(11)}-THC, exo-Tetrahydrocannabinol
- ATC code: None

Identifiers
- IUPAC name: (6aR,10aR)-6,6-dimethyl-9-methylidene-3-pentyl-7,8,10,10a-tetrahydro-6aH-benzo[c]chromen-1-ol
- CAS Number: 16849-44-8 27179-28-8
- PubChem CID: 167577

Chemical and physical data
- Formula: C_{21}H_{30}O_{2}
- Molar mass: 314.469 g·mol^{−1}
- 3D model (JSmol): Interactive image
- SMILES: CCCCCC1=CC(=C2[C@@H]3CC(=C)CC[C@H]3C(OC2=C1)(C)C)O
- InChI: InChI=1S/C21H30O2/c1-5-6-7-8-15-12-18(22)20-16-11-14(2)9-10-17(16)21(3,4)23-19(20)13-15/h12-13,16-17,22H,2,5-11H2,1,3-4H3/t16-,17-/m1/s1; Key:AOYYFUGUUIRBML-IAGOWNOFSA-N

Δ^{11}-Tetrahydrocannabinol (delta-11-THC, exo-THC, Δ^{11}-THC, Δ^{9(11)}-THC, exo-tetrahydrocannabinol) is a rare isomer of tetrahydrocannabinol (Δ^{9}-THC), developed in the 1970s. It can be synthesized from Δ^{8}-THC by several different routes, though only the (6aR, 10aR) enantiomer is known.

In recent studies in 2022 it was found to "significantly reduce" the effects of Δ^{9}-THC and has been suggested to act as a CB_{1} receptor antagonist in humans, with the cited study showing "one partial success in the quest for an antagonist is the fact that D9,11-THC was found to significantly reduce the effect of D9-THC" and did not substitute for Δ^{9}-THC in rhesus monkeys. It has been identified as a component of grey market vaping liquids sold for use in humans. Δ^{11}-THC has been identified as an impurity found in pharmaceutical dronabinol.

== Legality ==
=== United States ===
As of now, Δ^{11}-THC is federally legal and uncontrolled, and faces no repercussions for possession unless in Arkansas or other states that prohibit intoxicating hemp-derived cannabinoids. However, Δ^{11}-THC, being an isomer and analogue of illicit Δ^{9}-THC means it can be persecuted under the Federal Analogue Act.

==== Arkansas ====
As of 25 June 2025, the U.S. 8th Circuit Court of Appeals overturned a lower court's injunction, allowing Arkansas to enforce its ban on hemp-derived THC products, including Δ^{11}-THC. This ruling means that Act 629, which classifies delta-8, delta-9 (above 0.3%), and delta-10 THC ("Psychoactive hemp-derived cannabinoids" as stated in Act 629) as Schedule VI controlled substances in the state, is now enforceable. Previously, sales of these products had been temporarily permitted due to the injunction.

=== Japan ===
Δ^{11}-THC falls under general THC restriction in Japan and is illegal to possess or use.

== See also ==
- Abeo-HHC acetate
- Cis-THC
- Δ3-Tetrahydrocannabinol
- Δ4-Tetrahydrocannabinol
- Δ7-Tetrahydrocannabinol
- Δ10-Tetrahydrocannabinol
- Hexahydrocannabinol
- Isotetrahydrocannabinol
- L-759,656
