= C22H32O2 =

The molecular formula C_{22}H_{32}O_{2}(molar mass: 328.48 g/mol) may refer to

- Allyltestosterone
- Delta-8-THCM
- Docosahexaenoic acid
- Grifolin
- 17α-Methylprogesterone
- Parahexyl
- Promestriene
- Retinyl acetate
- Tetrahydrocannabihexol
- Zuretinol acetate
