= Δ4-Tetrahydrocannabinol =

Chemical compound

Δ^{4}-Tetrahydrocannabinol

Identifiers
- IUPAC name: (9R,10aR)-6,6,9-trimethyl-3-pentyl-8,9,10,10a-tetrahydrobenzo[c]chromen-1-ol
- CAS Number: 59042-44-3
- PubChem CID: 91936925
- ChemSpider: 26608727
- UNII: 0M4C88EI3H
- KEGG: C22744
- CompTox Dashboard (EPA): DTXSID701336770

Chemical and physical data
- Formula: C_{21}H_{30}O_{2}
- Molar mass: 314.469 g·mol^{−1}
- 3D model (JSmol): Interactive image
- SMILES: CCCCCC1=CC(=C2[C@@H]3C[C@@H](CC=C3C(OC2=C1)(C)C)C)O
- InChI: InChI=1S/C21H30O2/c1-5-6-7-8-15-12-18(22)20-16-11-14(2)9-10-17(16)21(3,4)23-19(20)13-15/h10,12-14,16,22H,5-9,11H2,1-4H3/t14-,16-/m1/s1; Key:UQOUHXDCXBITSF-GDBMZVCRSA-N

Δ^{4}-Tetrahydrocannabinol (Delta-4-THC, Δ^{4}-THC, Δ^{6a(7)}-THC) is a synthetic isomer of tetrahydrocannabinol, developed in the 1970s during research to develop improved synthetic routes to the natural forms Δ^{8}-THC and Δ^{9}-THC. Only the (9R, 10aR) enantiomer has been synthesised, though other isomers are possible.

== See also ==
- 7,8-Dihydrocannabinol
- Delta-3-Tetrahydrocannabinol
- Delta-7-Tetrahydrocannabinol
- Delta-10-Tetrahydrocannabinol
- Hexahydrocannabinol
