= C19H26O2 =

The molecular formula C_{19}H_{26}O_{2} (molar mass: 286.40 g/mol, exact mass: 286.19328) may refer to:

- Androstenedione, a natural steroid
- 1-Androstenedione, a synthetic anabolic steroid
- 5-Androstenedione, a synthetic anabolic steroid
- Boldenone, an anabolic steroid for veterinary use
- Cannabichromevarin, a cannabinoid, CBCV
- Cannabidivarin, a cannabinoid, CBDV
- Methyldienolone, a synthetic anabolic steroid
- Methylestradiol, a synthetic estrogen
- 7α-Methylestradiol
- 7α-Methyl-19-norandrostenedione
- O-1918, a synthetic cannabinoid
- Tetrahydrocannabivarin, a cannabinoid
