= CBNA =

CBNA may refer to:

- CBNA-FM, a radio station in St. Anthony, Newfoundland and Labrador, Canada
- Citibank, National Association, a bank headquartered in New York City, US
- Coe-Brown Northwood Academy, a high school in New Hampshire, US
- Community Bank, N.A., a bank serving customers in the Northeastern US
- Cannabinolic acid, a cannabinoid
