= Tetrahydrocannabihexol =

Chemical compound

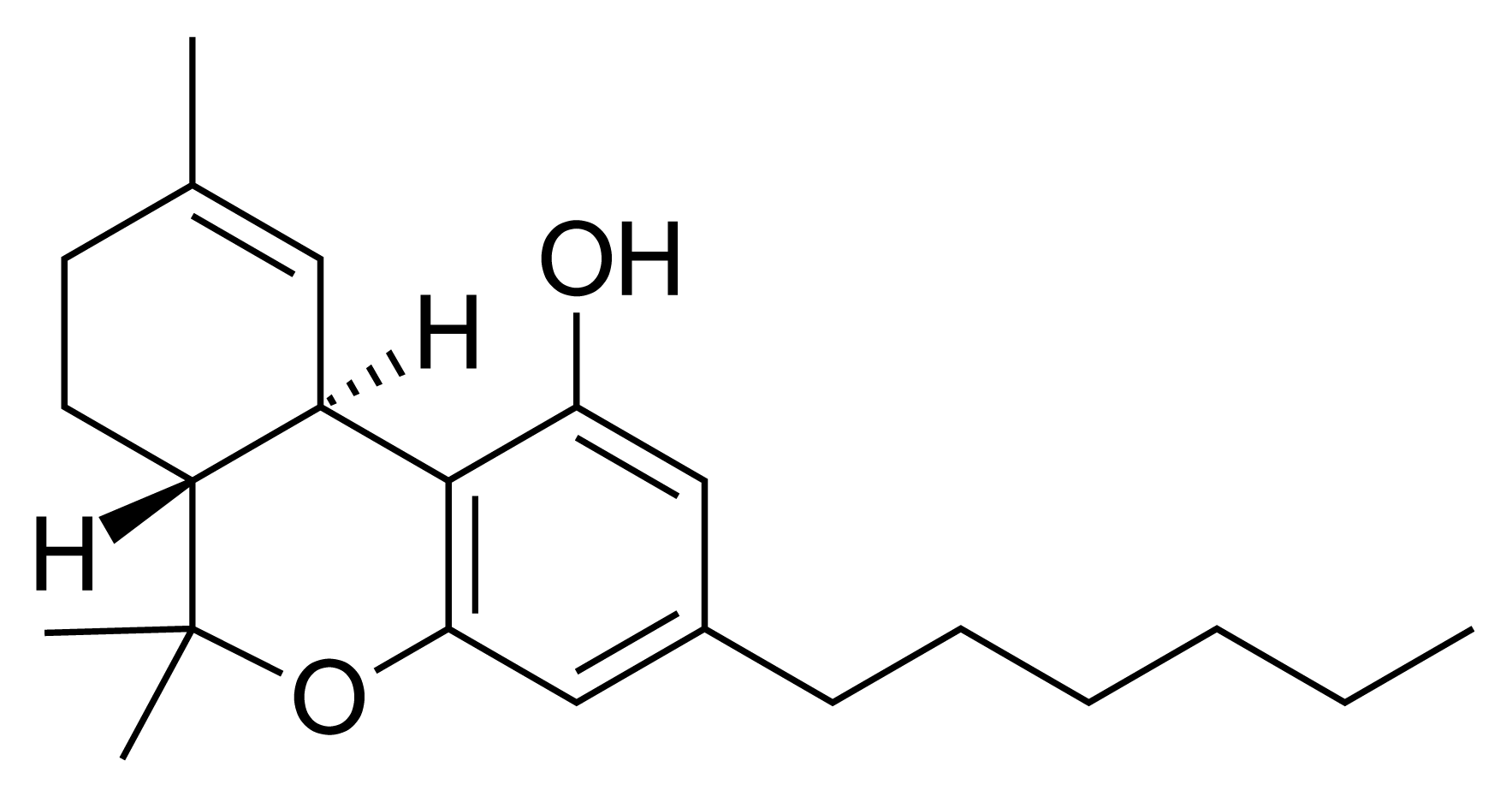

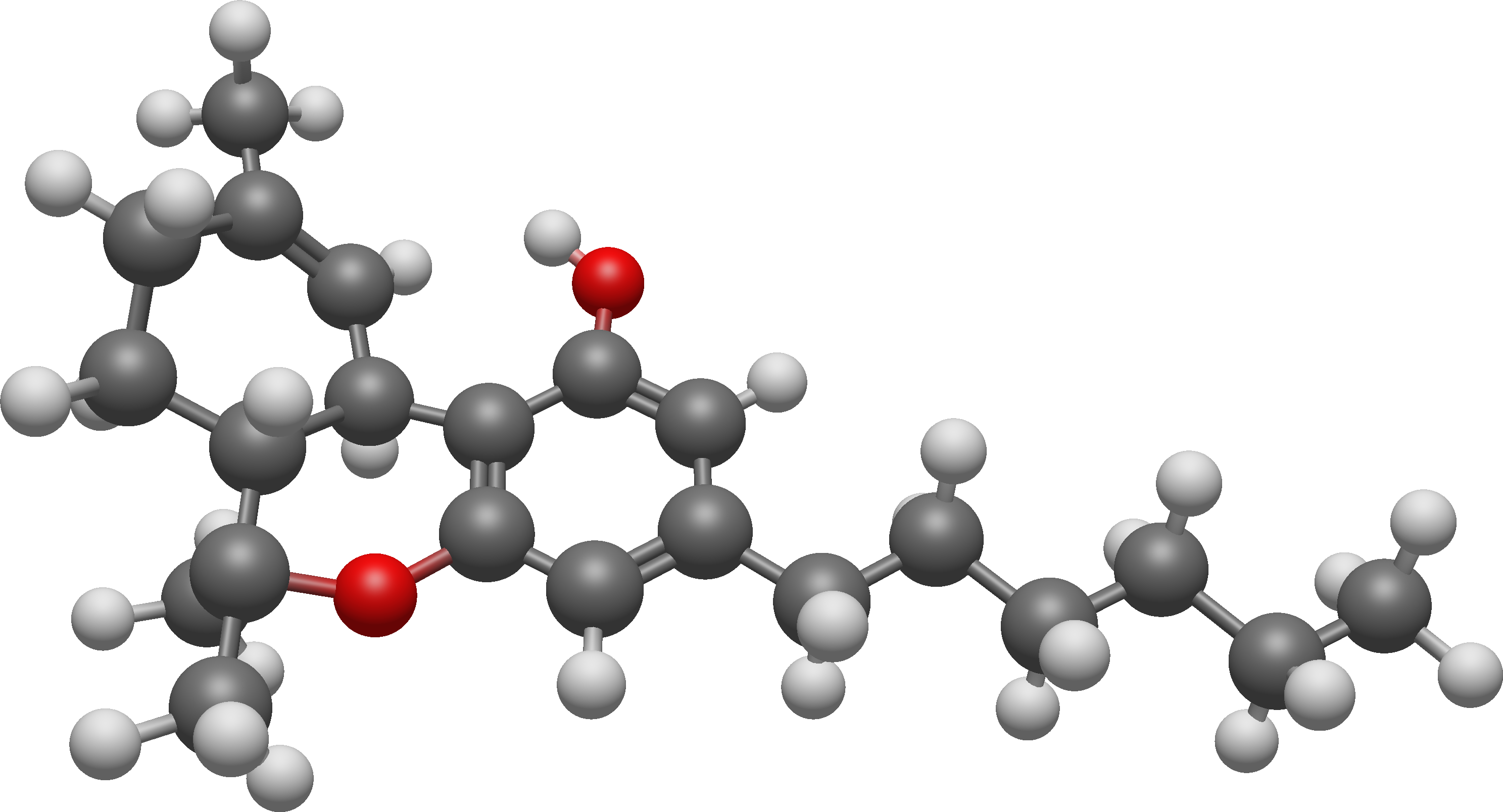

Identifiers
- IUPAC name: (6aR,10aR)-3-hexyl-6,6,9-trimethyl-6a,7,8,10a-tetrahydrobenzo[c]chromen-1-ol
- CAS Number: 36482-24-3
- PubChem CID: 161906
- ChemSpider: 142196
- CompTox Dashboard (EPA): DTXSID90957796

Chemical and physical data
- Formula: C_{22}H_{32}O_{2}
- Molar mass: 328.496 g·mol^{−1}
- 3D model (JSmol): Interactive image
- SMILES: CCCCCCC1=CC(=C2[C@@H]3C=C(CC[C@H]3C(OC2=C1)(C)C)C)O
- InChI: InChI=1S/C22H32O2/c1-5-6-7-8-9-16-13-19(23)21-17-12-15(2)10-11-18(17)22(3,4)24-20(21)14-16/h12-14,17-18,23H,5-11H2,1-4H3/t17-,18-/m1/s1; Key:DMJVNNFBMZZLFB-QZTJIDSGSA-N

Tetrahydrocannabihexol (Δ^{9}-THCH, Δ^{9}-Parahexyl, n-Hexyl-Δ^{9}-THC) is a phytocannabinoid, the hexyl homologue of tetrahydrocannabinol (THC) which was first isolated from Cannabis plant material in 2020 along with the corresponding hexyl homologue of cannabidiol, though it had been known for several decades prior to this as an isomer of the synthetic cannabinoid parahexyl. Another isomer Δ^{8}-THCH is also known as a synthetic cannabinoid under the code number JWH-124, though it is unclear whether this occurs naturally in Cannabis, but likely is due to Δ^{8}-THC itself being a degraded form of Δ^{9}-THC. THC-Hexyl can be synthesized from 4-hexylresorcinol and was studied by Roger Adams as early as 1942.

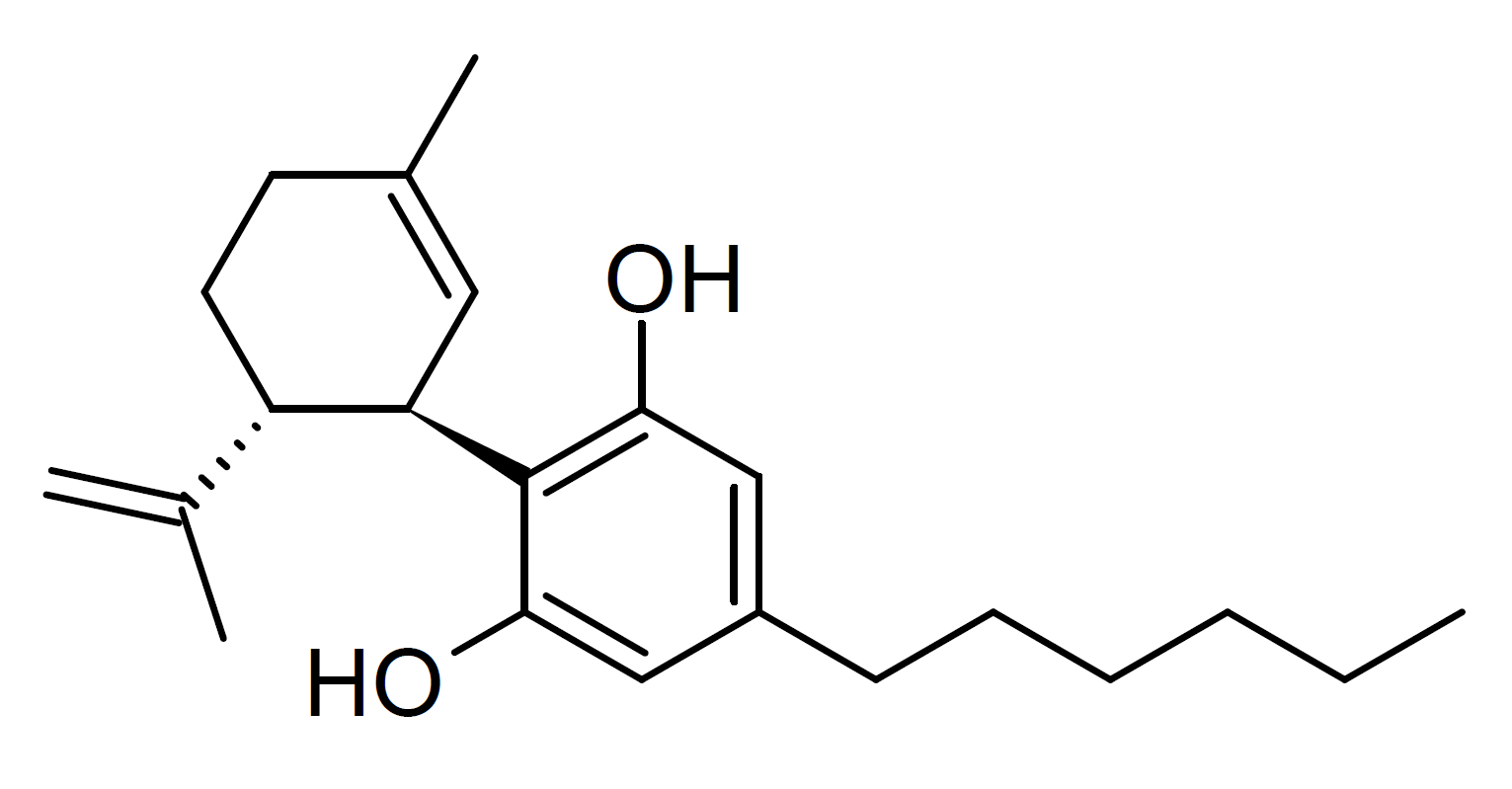
Cannabidihexol (CBDH), 2552798-21-5

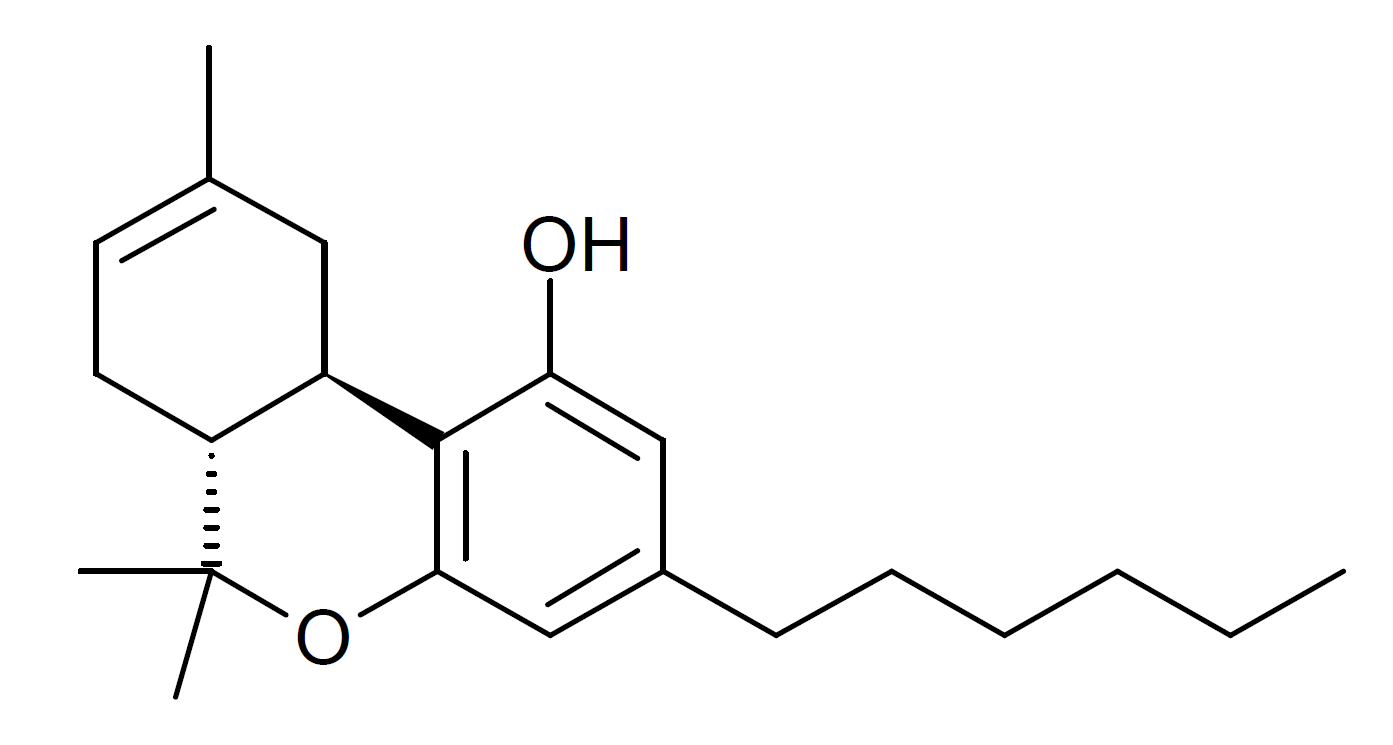
JWH-124 (Δ^{8}-THCH), 20622-30-4

== See also ==
- 1'-Dimethyl-Δ9-THCH
- Cannabidiphorol
- Hexahydrocannabihexol
- Tetrahydrocannabiorcol
- Tetrahydrocannabivarin
- Tetrahydrocannabutol
- Tetrahydrocannabiphorol
