= Cannabichromenic acid =

Names
- IUPAC name 5-Hydroxy-2-methyl-2-(4-methylpent-3-enyl)-7-pentylchromene-6-carboxylic acid
- Other names: CBCA; (+)-Cannabichromenic acid

Identifiers
CAS Number	(±): 185505-15-1; (+): 20408-52-0
3D model (JSmol)	(±): Interactive image
ChEBI	(±): CHEBI:167557
ChEMBL	(±): ChEMBL4594109
ChemSpider	(±): 2341420
PubChem CID	(±): 3084339
UNII	(±): NNW8UMP980
CompTox Dashboard (EPA)	(±): DTXSID301336859 DTXSID80942575, DTXSID301336859
- InChI: InChI=1S/C22H30O4/c1-5-6-7-10-16-14-18-17(20(23)19(16)21(24)25)11-13-22(4,26-18)12-8-9-15(2)3/h9,11,13-14,23H,5-8,10,12H2,1-4H3,(H,24,25) Key: HRHJHXJQMNWQTF-UHFFFAOYSA-N
- SMILES: (±): CCCCCC1=CC2=C(C=CC(O2)(C)CCC=C(C)C)C(=C1C(=O)O)O

Properties
Chemical formula	C_{22}H_{30}O_{4}
Molar mass	358.478 g·mol^{−1}
- Except where otherwise noted, data are given for materials in their standard state (at 25 °C [77 °F], 100 kPa). Infobox references

Cannabichromenic acid (CBCA) is minor cannabinoid and precursor of cannabichromene.

== Biosynthesis ==
Geranyl pyrophosphate and olivetolic acid combine to produce cannabigerolic acid (CBGA; the sole intermediate for all other phytocannabinoids). The enzyme CBCA synthase can cyclize either cannabigerolic acid or cannabinerolic acid (the Z isomer of CBGA) to form CBCA.

== See also ==
- Cannabielsoin
- Cannabisin F
