= Cannabidiorcol =

Phytocannabinoid

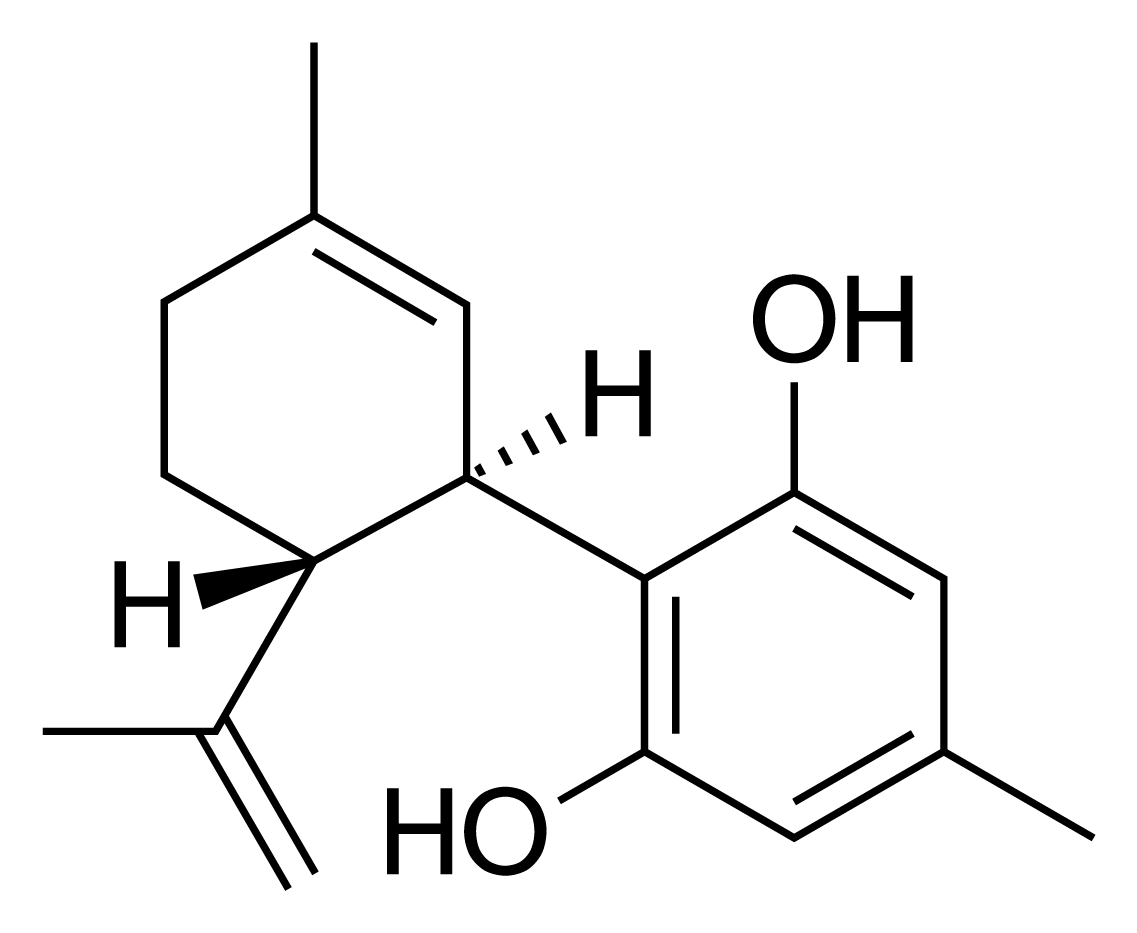

Identifiers
- IUPAC name: 5-methyl-2-[(1R,6R)-3-methyl-6-prop-1-en-2-ylcyclohex-2-en-1-yl]benzene-1,3-diol
- CAS Number: 35482-50-9
- PubChem CID: 16657068
- ChemSpider: 17590348
- UNII: 259WR5E2RF

Chemical and physical data
- Formula: C_{17}H_{22}O_{2}
- Molar mass: 258.361 g·mol^{−1}
- 3D model (JSmol): Interactive image
- SMILES: CC1=C[C@H]([C@@H](CC1)C(=C)C)C2=C(C=C(C=C2O)C)O
- InChI: InChI=1S/C17H22O2/c1-10(2)13-6-5-11(3)7-14(13)17-15(18)8-12(4)9-16(17)19/h7-9,13-14,18-19H,1,5-6H2,2-4H3/t13-,14+/m0/s1; Key:GKVOVXWEBSQJPA-UONOGXRCSA-N

Cannabidiorcol (CBDO, CBD-C1, O-1821) is a phytocannabinoid found naturally in Cannabis in trace concentrations. It is related to cannabidiol, with the pentyl side chain shortened to a methyl group. Cannabidiorcol has low affinity for cannabinoid receptors and is mainly active as an agonist of the TRPV2 cation channel, through which it produces antiinflammatory effects, but can also promote tumorigenesis at high concentrations.

== See also ==
- Abnormal cannabidiol
- Cannabidivarin
- O-1918
- Tetrahydrocannabiorcol
