= 7,8-Dihydrocannabinol =

Chemical compound

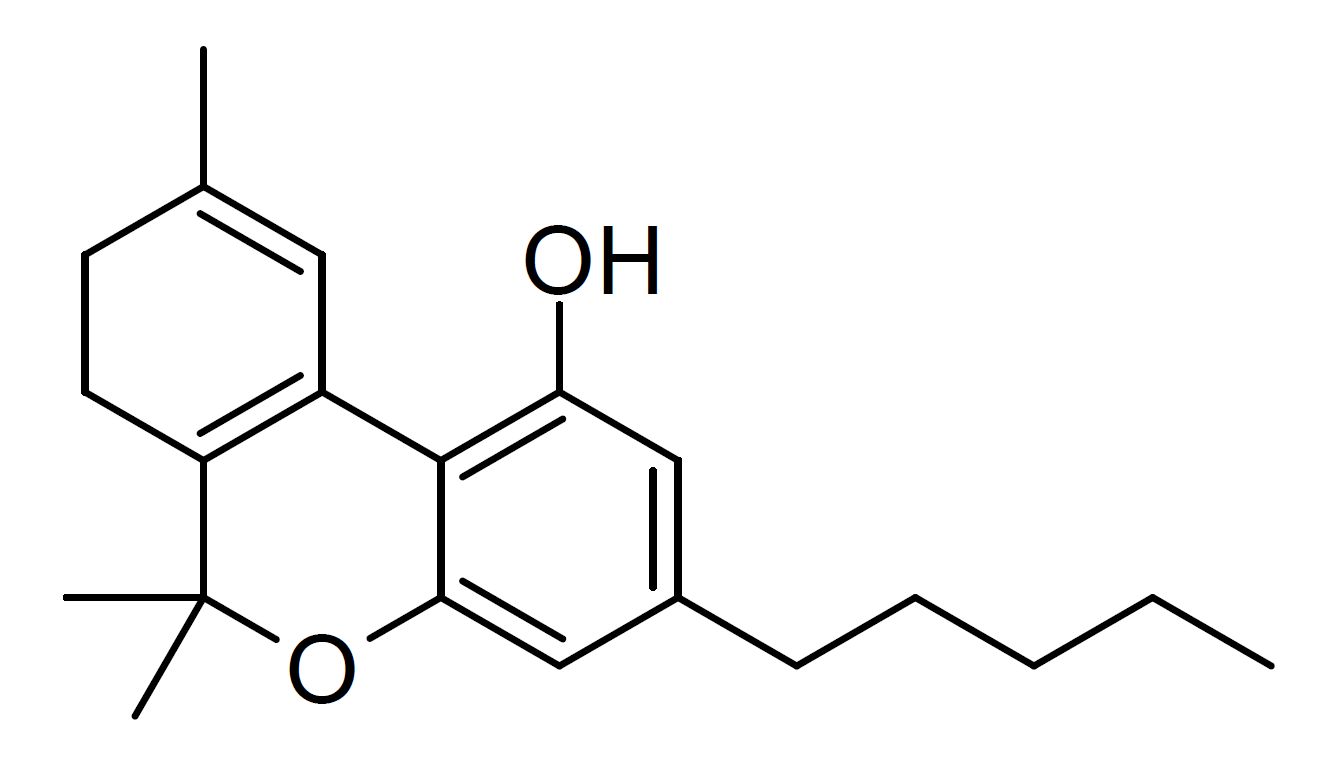

Identifiers
- IUPAC name: 6,6,9-trimethyl-3-pentyl-7,8-dihydrobenzo[c]chromen-1-ol
- CAS Number: 60491-22-7
- PubChem CID: 94376
- ChemSpider: 58828803
- CompTox Dashboard (EPA): DTXSID201337078

Chemical and physical data
- Formula: C_{21}H_{28}O_{2}
- Molar mass: 312.453 g·mol^{−1}
- 3D model (JSmol): Interactive image
- SMILES: CCCCCC1=CC(=C2C(=C1)OC(C3=C2C=C(CC3)C)(C)C)O
- InChI: InChI=1S/C21H28O2/c1-5-6-7-8-15-12-18(22)20-16-11-14(2)9-10-17(16)21(3,4)23-19(20)13-15/h11-13,22H,5-10H2,1-4H3; Key:RECLSNODOVFMMU-UHFFFAOYSA-N

7,8-Dihydrocannabinol (7,8-DHC) is a trace component of cannabis. Despite its structural similarity to active cannabinoids such as tetrahydrocannabinol and cannabinol, its pharmacology has not been studied.

== See also ==
- 8,9-Dihydrocannabidiol
- Delta-3-THC
- Delta-4-THC
- Delta-7-THC
- Delta-8-THC
- Delta-10-THC
- Hexahydrocannabinol
