= Cannabivarin =

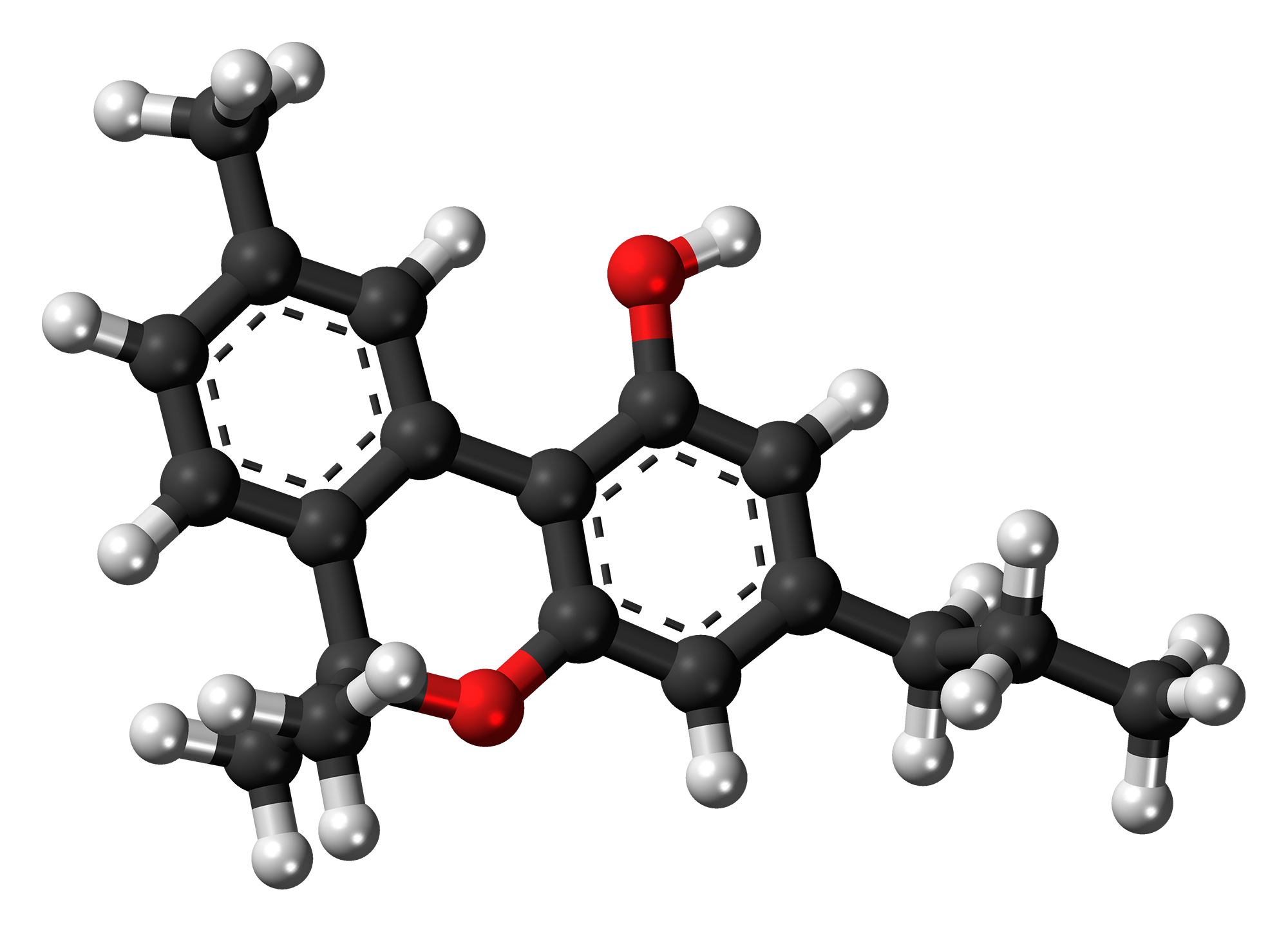

Names
- Preferred IUPAC name 6,6,9-Trimethyl-3-propyl-6H-dibenzo[b,d]pyran-1-ol
- Other names 6,6,9-Trimethyl-3-propyl-6H-benzo[c]chromen-1-ol

Identifiers
CAS Number	33745-21-0
3D model (JSmol)	Interactive image
ChemSpider	540898
MeSH	cannabivarin
PubChem CID	622545
UNII	MHH8UW410N
CompTox Dashboard (EPA)	DTXSID00187421
- InChI: InChI=1S/C19H22O2/c1-5-6-13-10-16(20)18-14-9-12(2)7-8-15(14)19(3,4)21-17(18)11-13/h7-11,20H,5-6H2,1-4H3 Key: SVTKBAIRFMXQQF-UHFFFAOYSA-N; InChI=1/C19H22O2/c1-5-6-13-10-16(20)18-14-9-12(2)7-8-15(14)19(3,4)21-17(18)11-13/h7-11,20H,5-6H2,1-4H3 Key: SVTKBAIRFMXQQF-UHFFFAOYAK
- SMILES: Oc2cc(cc1OC(c3c(c12)cc(cc3)C)(C)C)CCC

Properties
Chemical formula	C_{19}H_{22}O_{2}
Molar mass	282.38 g/mol
- Except where otherwise noted, data are given for materials in their standard state (at 25 °C [77 °F], 100 kPa). verify (what is ?) Infobox references

Cannabivarin (CBV), also known as cannabivarol, is considered a non-psychoactive cannabinoid – it does not produce the euphoric side effects found in THC. Minor amounts of CBV are found in the hemp plant Cannabis sativa. It is an analog of cannabinol (CBN) with the side chain shortened by two methylene bridges (−CH_{2}−). CBV is an oxidation product of tetrahydrocannabivarin (THCV, THV).

== Chemistry ==
It has no double bond isomers nor stereoisomers.

== Legal status ==
It is not scheduled by Convention on Psychotropic Substances.

=== United States ===
CBV is not scheduled at the federal level in the United States, but it could be considered an analog (of THC), in which case, sales or possession intended for human consumption could be prosecuted under the Federal Analog Act.

== See also ==
- Cannabinoids
- Cannabis
- Medical cannabis
