= Cannabigerovarin =

Organic chemical compound

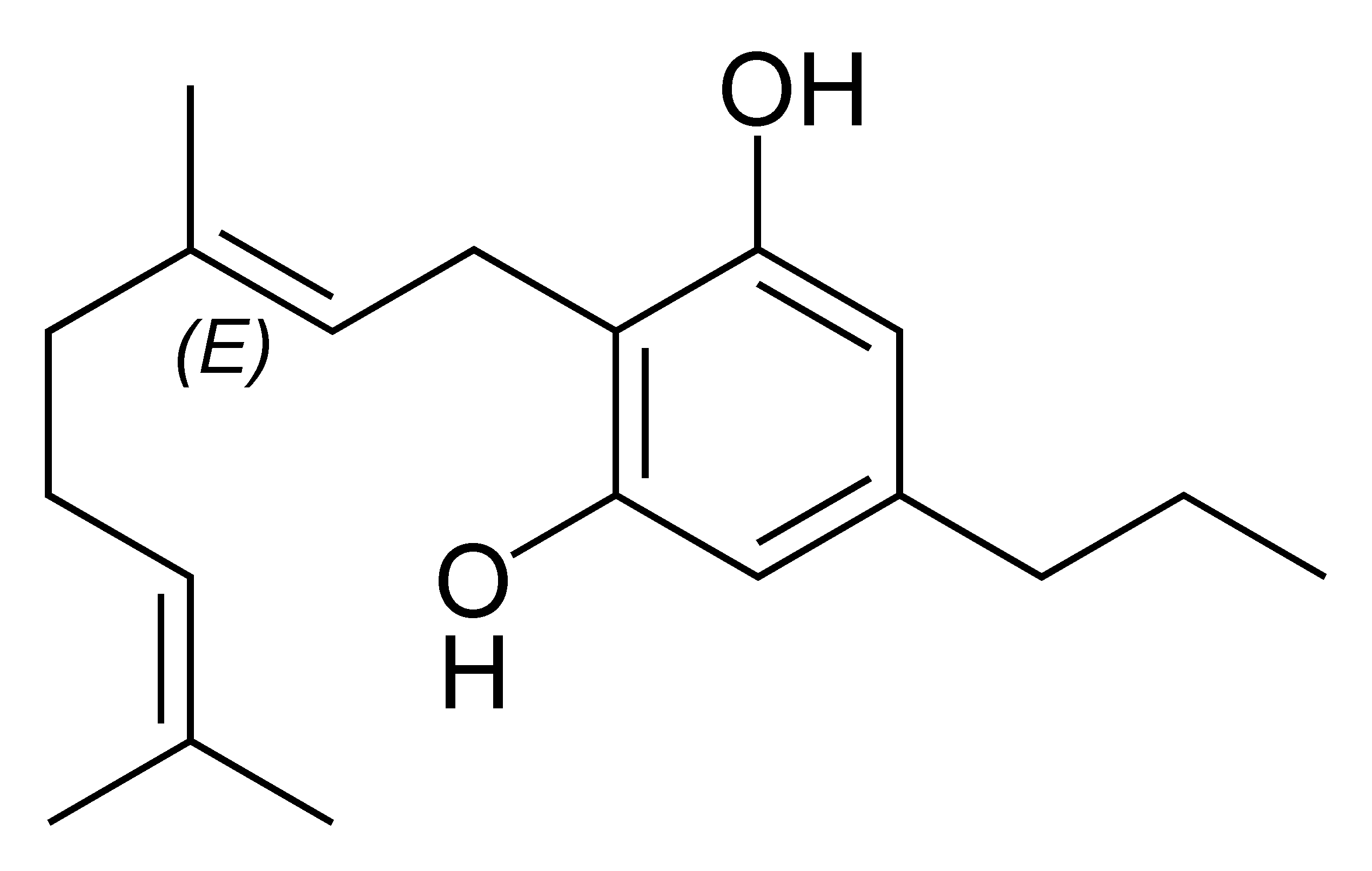

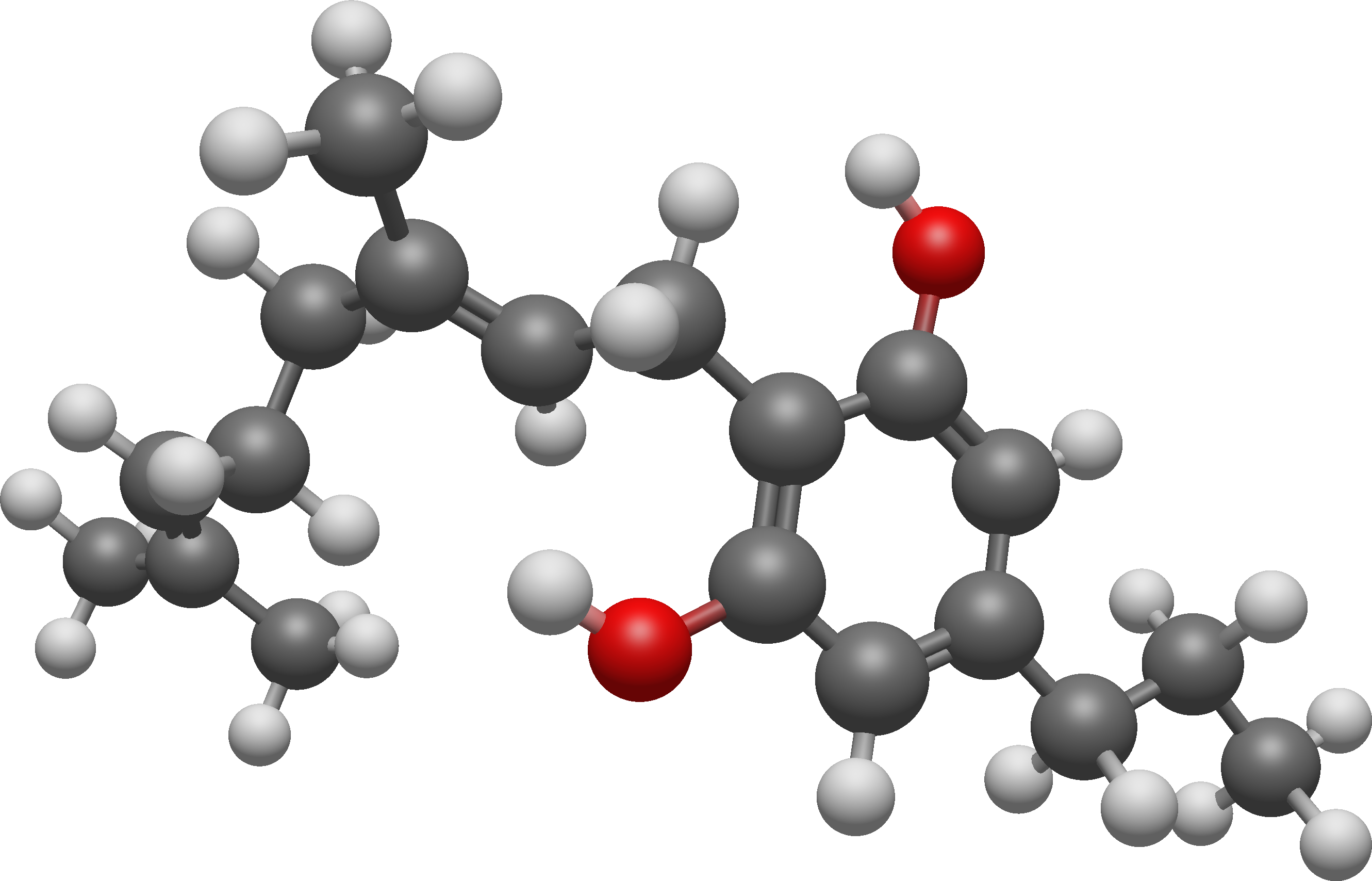

Names
- IUPAC name 2-[(2E)-3,7-dimethylocta-2,6-dienyl]-5-propylbenzene-1,3-diol
- Other names Cannabigerovarol; CBGV

Identifiers
CAS Number	55824-11-8
3D model (JSmol)	Interactive image
ChemSpider	32702027
PubChem CID	59444407
UNII	34S78SNA69
CompTox Dashboard (EPA)	DTXSID601345013
- InChI: InChI=1S/C19H28O2/c1-5-7-16-12-18(20)17(19(21)13-16)11-10-15(4)9-6-8-14(2)3/h8,10,12-13,20-21H,5-7,9,11H2,1-4H3/b15-10+
- SMILES: CCCC1=CC(=C(C(=C1)O)C/C=C(\C)/CCC=C(C)C)O

Properties
Chemical formula	C_{19}H_{28}O_{2}
Molar mass	288.431 g·mol^{−1}
- Except where otherwise noted, data are given for materials in their standard state (at 25 °C [77 °F], 100 kPa). Infobox references

Cannabigerovarin (CBGV), the propyl homolog of cannabigerol (CBG), is a cannabinoid present in Cannabis. There are no psychoactive or psychotropic effects of consuming or inhaling CBGV.

== Usages ==
The possible benefits of cannabigerovarin in human bodies are painkilling and anti-inflammatory properties to treat conditions like fibromyalgia and arthritis, the treatment and improvement of the dry-skin syndrome, cancer treatment by reducing the growth of cancer cells in patients who have leukemia.

According to the pain-relieving effects of this natural cannabinoid, it can be helpful to treat patients who were undergoing drug exposure like chemotherapy or radiation therapy. In addition, cannabigerol metabolism increases and has a better absorption from the body when paired with cannabigerovarin.
