= Parahexyl =

Synthetic homologue of THC

Clinical data
- Other names: Synhexyl, n-hexyl-Δ^{3}-THC, (C6)-Δ^{6a(10a)}-THC
- Drug class: Cannabinoid
- ATC code: none

Legal status
- Legal status: BR: Class F2 (Prohibited psychotropics); CA: Schedule II; DE: Anlage I (Authorized scientific use only); UK: Class B; US: Schedule I; UN: Psychotropic Schedule I

Identifiers
- IUPAC name: 3-n-hexyl- 7,8,9,10-tetrahydro- 6,6,9-trimethyl- 6H-dibenzo(b,d)pyran- 1-ol
- CAS Number: 117-51-1
- PubChem CID: 8334
- ChemSpider: 8031
- UNII: 450N174F9W
- KEGG: C22779
- CompTox Dashboard (EPA): DTXSID90861748

Chemical and physical data
- Formula: C_{22}H_{32}O_{2}
- Molar mass: 328.496 g·mol^{−1}
- 3D model (JSmol): Interactive image
- SMILES: Oc2cc(cc1OC(C\3=C(/c12)CC(CC/3)C)(C)C)CCCCCC
- InChI: InChI=1S/C22H32O2/c1-5-6-7-8-9-16-13-19(23)21-17-12-15(2)10-11-18(17)22(3,4)24-20(21)14-16/h13-15,23H,5-12H2,1-4H3; Key:OORFXDSWECAQLI-UHFFFAOYSA-N

Parahexyl, also known as synhexyl, is a synthetic homologue of tetrahydrocannabinol (THC) which was invented in 1941 during attempts to elucidate the structure of Δ^{9}-THC, one of the active components of cannabis.

Parahexyl is similar in both structure and activity to THC, differing only in the position of one double bond and the lengthening of the 3-pentyl chain by one CH_{2} group to n-hexyl. Parahexyl produces effects typical of other cannabinoid receptor agonists in animals. It has a somewhat higher oral bioavailability than THC itself but is otherwise very similar. Presumably, it acts as a CB_{1} receptor agonist in the same way as THC, but as there has been no research published using parahexyl since the discovery of the CB_{1} receptor, this has not been definitively confirmed.

Parahexyl was occasionally used as an anxiolytic in the mid-20th century, the dosage ranging from 5 mg to 90 mg.

Parahexyl was made illegal under UN convention in 1971 on the basis of its structural similarity and similar effects profile to THC. Parahexyl was placed into the most restrictive Schedule I as a compound with no medical use.

== Isomerism ==
At least three isomers of parahexyl have been studied and are known to be active as cannabinoids. Parahexyl itself (i.e. the Δ^{6a(10a)} isomer) has not had any significant use in scientific research since it was banned internationally in the early 1980s; however, the Δ^{8} and Δ^{9} isomers are both known to be cannabinoid receptor agonists, and Δ^{8}-parahexyl has the code number JWH-124, while Δ^{9}-parahexyl has been isolated from Cannabis plant material and assigned the name tetrahydrocannabihexol (THCH).

Dibenzopyran and monoterpenoid numbering of tetrahydrocannabinol derivatives

7 double bond isomers of parahexyl and their 30 stereoisomers
Dibenzopyran numbering			Monoterpenoid numbering		Number of stereoisomers	Natural occurrence	Convention on Psychotropic Substances Schedule
Short name	Chiral centers	Full name	Short name	Chiral centers	Number of stereoisomers	Natural occurrence	Convention on Psychotropic Substances Schedule
Δ^{6a(7)}-parahexyl	9 and 10a	3-hexyl-8,9,10,10a-tetrahydro-6,6,9-trimethyl-6H-dibenzo[b,d]pyran-1-ol	Δ^{4}-parahexyl	1 and 3	4	No	unscheduled
Δ^{7}-parahexyl	6a, 9 and 10a	3-hexyl-6a,9,10,10a-tetrahydro-6,6,9-trimethyl-6H-dibenzo[b,d]pyran-1-ol	Δ^{5}-parahexyl	1, 3 and 4	8	No	unscheduled
Δ^{8}-parahexyl	6a and 10a	3-hexyl-6a,7,10,10a-tetrahydro-6,6,9-trimethyl-6H-dibenzo[b,d]pyran-1-ol	Δ^{6}-parahexyl	3 and 4	4	No	unscheduled
Δ^{9,11}-parahexyl	6a and 10a	3-hexyl-6a,7,8,9,10,10a-hexahydro-6,6-dimethyl-9-methylene-6H-dibenzo[b,d]pyran-1-ol	Δ^{1(7)}-parahexyl	3 and 4	4	No	unscheduled
Δ^{9}-parahexyl	6a and 10a	3-hexyl-6a,7,8,10a-tetrahydro-6,6,9-trimethyl-6H-dibenzo[b,d]pyran-1-ol	Δ^{1}-parahexyl	3 and 4	4	No	unscheduled
Δ^{10}-parahexyl	6a and 9	3-hexyl-6a,7,8,9-tetrahydro-6,6,9-trimethyl-6H-dibenzo[b,d]pyran-1-ol	Δ^{2}-parahexyl	1 and 4	4	No	unscheduled
Δ^{6a(10a)}-parahexyl	9	3-hexyl-7,8,9,10-tetrahydro-6,6,9-trimethyl-6H-dibenzo[b,d]pyran-1-ol	Δ^{3}-parahexyl	1	2	No	Schedule I

Note that 6H-dibenzo[b,d]pyran-1-ol is the same as 6H-benzo[c]chromen-1-ol.

== See also ==
- Delta-3-Tetrahydrocannabinol (delta-3-THC)
- Hexahydrocannabihexol (HHCH)
- Tetrahydrocannabutol
- Tetrahydrocannabiphorol (THCP)
- Tetrahydrocannabivarin (THCV)
