= Cannabielsoin =

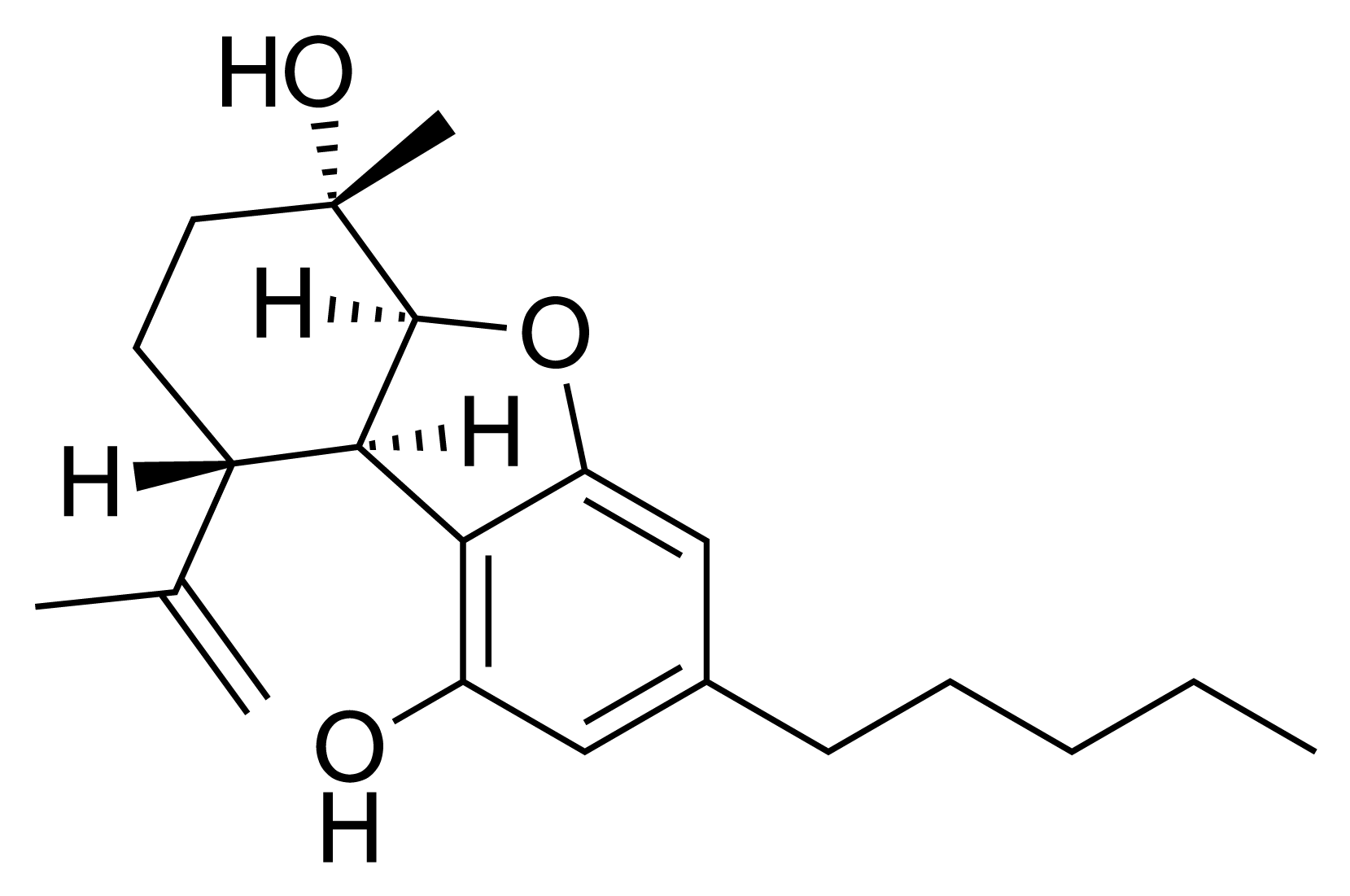

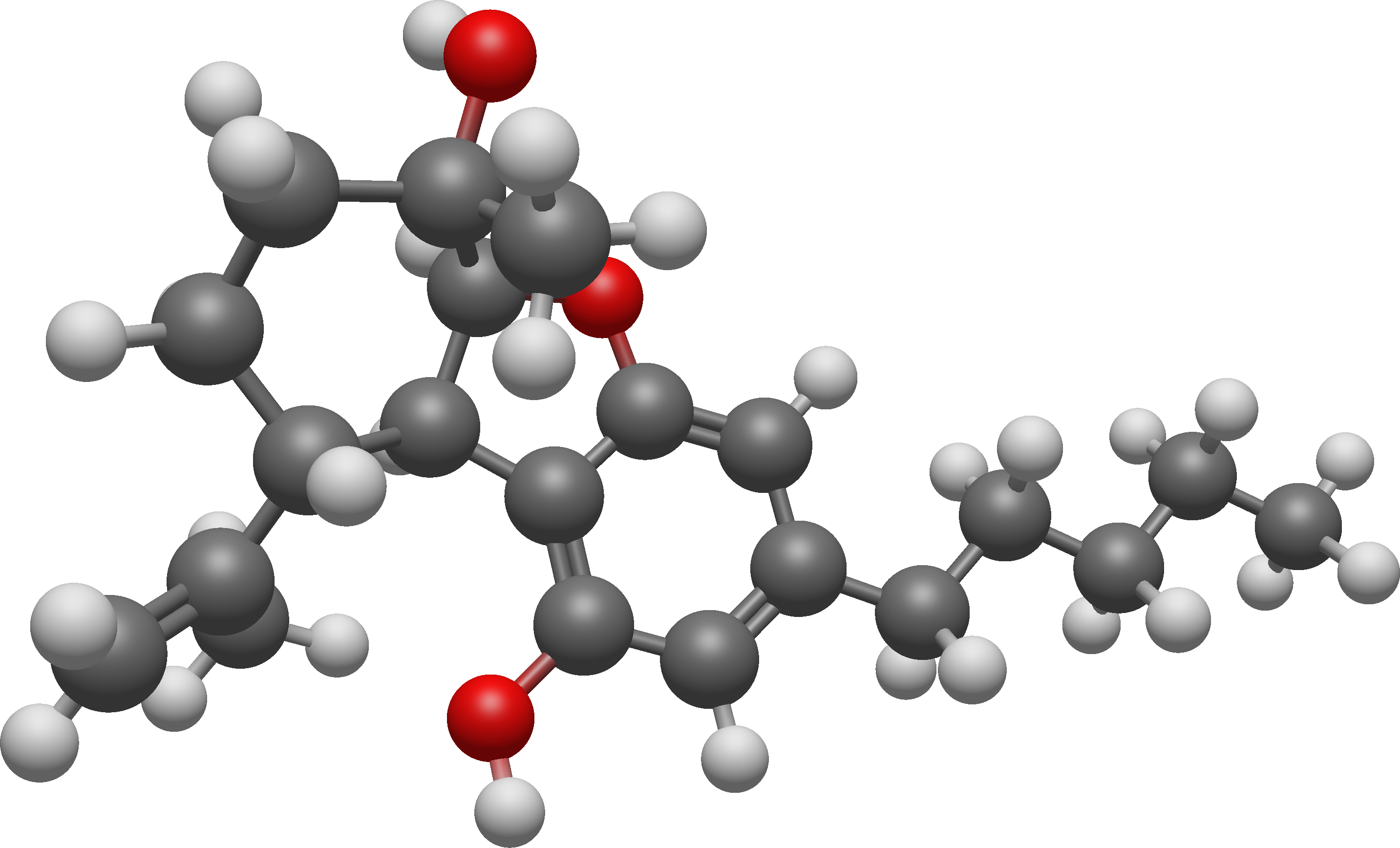

Names
- IUPAC name (5aS,6S,9R,9aR)-6-methyl-3-pentyl-9-prop-1-en-2-yl-7,8,9,9a-tetrahydro-5aH-dibenzofuran-1,6-diol
- Other names: Cannabielsoin A; CBE; Cannabielsoin I

Identifiers
CAS Number	52025-76-0
3D model (JSmol)	Interactive image
Abbreviations	CBE
ChemSpider	142372
KEGG	C20218
PubChem CID	162113
UNII	2ERD6V6652
CompTox Dashboard (EPA)	DTXSID50966364
- InChI: InChI=1S/C21H30O3/c1-5-6-7-8-14-11-16(22)19-17(12-14)24-20-18(19)15(13(2)3)9-10-21(20,4)23/h11-12,15,18,20,22-23H,2,5-10H2,1,3-4H3/t15-,18+,20-,21-/m0/s1 Key: RBEAVAMWZAJWOI-MTOHEIAKSA-N
- SMILES: CCCCCC1=CC(=C2[C@H]3[C@@H](CC[C@]([C@H]3OC2=C1)(C)O)C(=C)C)O

Properties
Chemical formula	C_{21}H_{30}O_{3}
Molar mass	330.468 g·mol^{−1}
- Except where otherwise noted, data are given for materials in their standard state (at 25 °C [77 °F], 100 kPa). Infobox references

Cannabielsoin (CBE) is a metabolite of cannabidiol, one of the major chemical components of cannabis.

== History ==
Cannabielsoin in scientific journals was first cited in 1973. It was concluded that cannabielsoin was formed from cannabidiol as part of the metabolic process and is non-psychoactive.

== See also ==
- Cannabicitran
- Cannabicyclol
- Cannabimovone
- Cannabitriol
- Iso-THC
