= Tetrahydrocannabiorcol =

Chemical compound

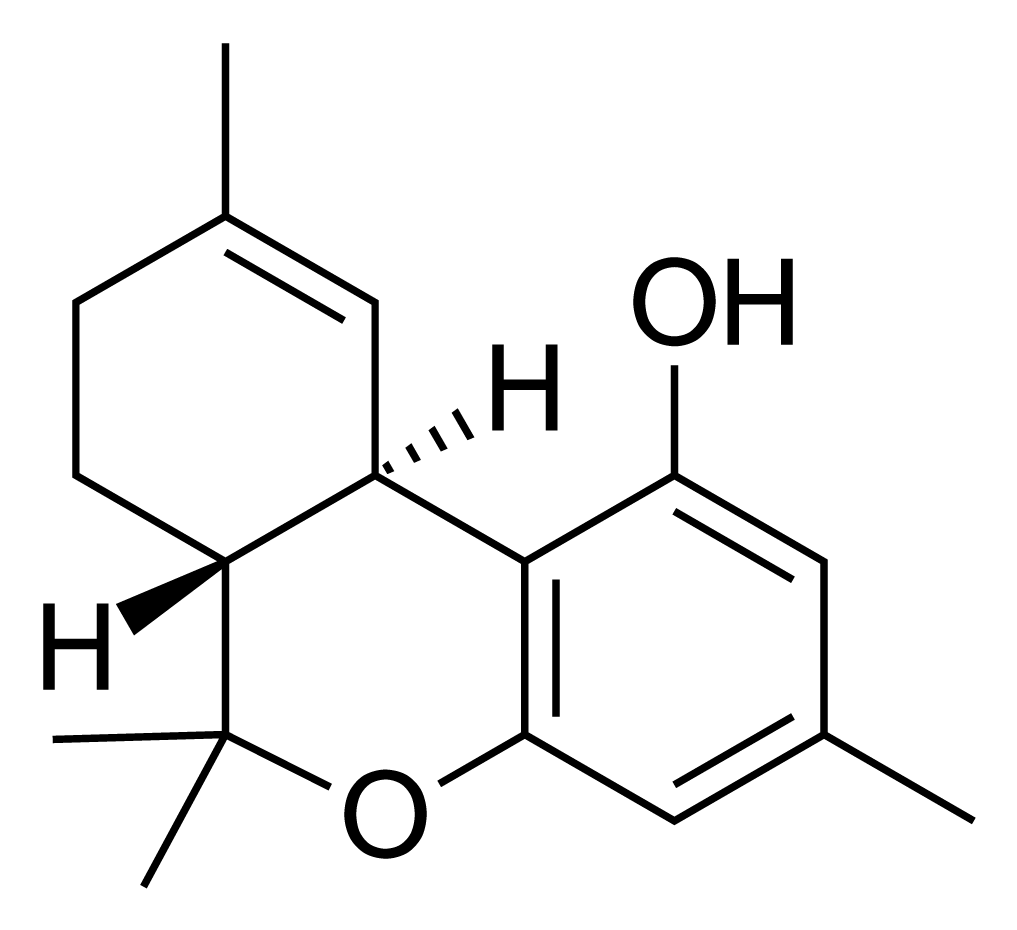

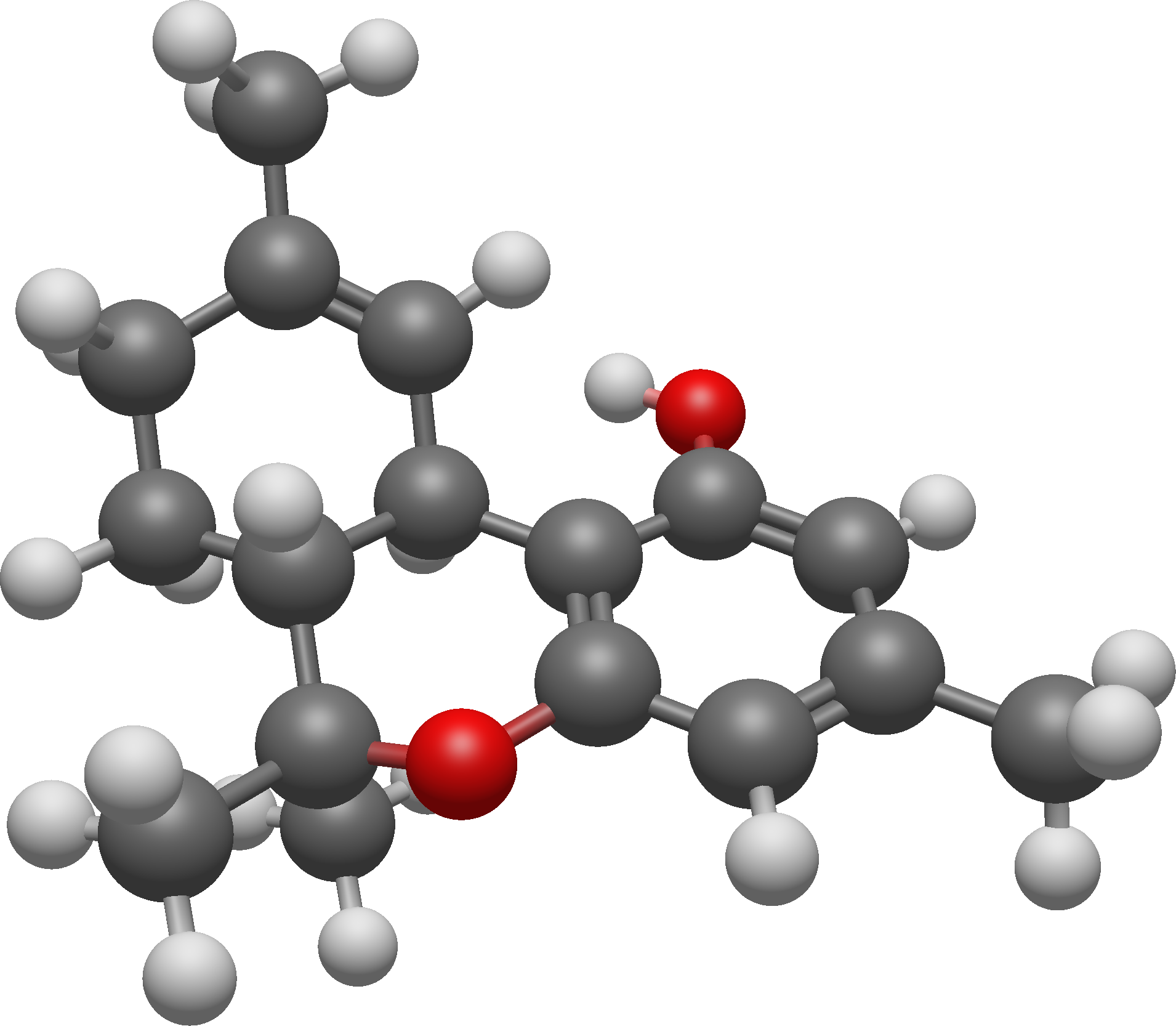

Identifiers
- IUPAC name: (6aR,10aR)-3,6,6,9-tetramethyl-6a,7,8,10a-tetrahydrobenzo[c]chromen-1-ol
- CAS Number: 22972-65-2
- PubChem CID: 22805649
- ChemSpider: 18522304
- UNII: 5D633LAJ19
- CompTox Dashboard (EPA): DTXSID901336645

Chemical and physical data
- Formula: C_{17}H_{22}O_{2}
- Molar mass: 258.361 g·mol^{−1}
- 3D model (JSmol): Interactive image
- SMILES: CC1=C[C@@H]2[C@@H](CC1)C(OC3=CC(=CC(=C23)O)C)(C)C
- InChI: InChI=1S/C17H22O2/c1-10-5-6-13-12(7-10)16-14(18)8-11(2)9-15(16)19-17(13,3)4/h7-9,12-13,18H,5-6H2,1-4H3/t12-,13-/m1/s1; Key:WIDIPARNVYRVNW-CHWSQXEVSA-N

Δ^{9}-Tetrahydrocannabiorcol (Δ^{9}-THCC, (C1)-Δ^{9}-THC) is a phytocannabinoid found in Cannabis pollen. It is a homologue of THC with the pentyl side chain replaced by a smaller methyl group. Unlike THC, THCC has negligible affinity for the CB_{1} and CB_{2} cannabinoid receptors because of the smaller methyl group and does not have psychoactive effects as a result, but conversely it is significantly more potent than THC or THCV as an activator of the TRPA1 calcium channel which plays an important role in pain perception, and it has been shown to produce analgesic effects via activation of spinal TRPA1 channels. THCC was studied by Roger Adams as early as 1942.

== See also ==
- Abnormal cannabidiol
- Cannabidiorcol
- O-1602
- O-1918
- Tetrahydrocannabiphorol
- Tetrahydrocannabutol
