= Zuretinol acetate =

Names
- IUPAC name [(2E,4E,6Z,8E)-3,7-dimethyl-9-(2,6,6-trimethylcyclohexen-1-yl)nona-2,4,6,8-tetraenyl] acetate
- Other names 9-cis-retinyl acetate, 9-cis-vitamin A acetate, 9-cis-retinal acetate

Identifiers
CAS Number	29584-22-3
3D model (JSmol)	Interactive image
ChEMBL	ChEMBL4297637
ChemSpider	8421459
DrugBank	DB12112
KEGG	C08590
PubChem CID	10245972
UNII	2K3YP54BYU
- InChI: InChI=1S/C22H32O2/c1-17(9-7-10-18(2)14-16-24-20(4)23)12-13-21-19(3)11-8-15-22(21,5)6/h7,9-10,12-14H,8,11,15-16H2,1-6H3/b10-7+,13-12+,17-9-,18-14+ Key: QGNJRVVDBSJHIZ-AQDFTDIISA-N
- SMILES: CC1=C(C(CCC1)(C)C)/C=C/C(=C\C=C\C(=C\COC(=O)C)\C)/C

Properties
Chemical formula	C_{22}H_{32}O_{2}
Molar mass	328.496 g·mol^{−1}
Appearance	light yellow oil
Melting point	57–58 °C (135–136 °F; 330–331 K)
Solubility in water	insoluble
- Except where otherwise noted, data are given for materials in their standard state (at 25 °C [77 °F], 100 kPa). Infobox references

Zuretinol acetate is a carotenoid, a synthetic derivative of vitamin A, commonly used in dietary supplements, pharmaceuticals, and skincare products.

== Isomer ==
9-cis-Retinal acetate is a specific geometric isomer of retinal, meaning it has a different arrangement of atoms around a double bond compared to other retinal isomers like 11-cis-retinal.

== Synthesis ==
The compound is an ester formed from retinol (vitamin A alcohol) and acetic acid, making it more stable than pure retinol.

== Uses ==
The compound is used for treatment of visual disorders.
