= Cannabicitran =

Chemical compound

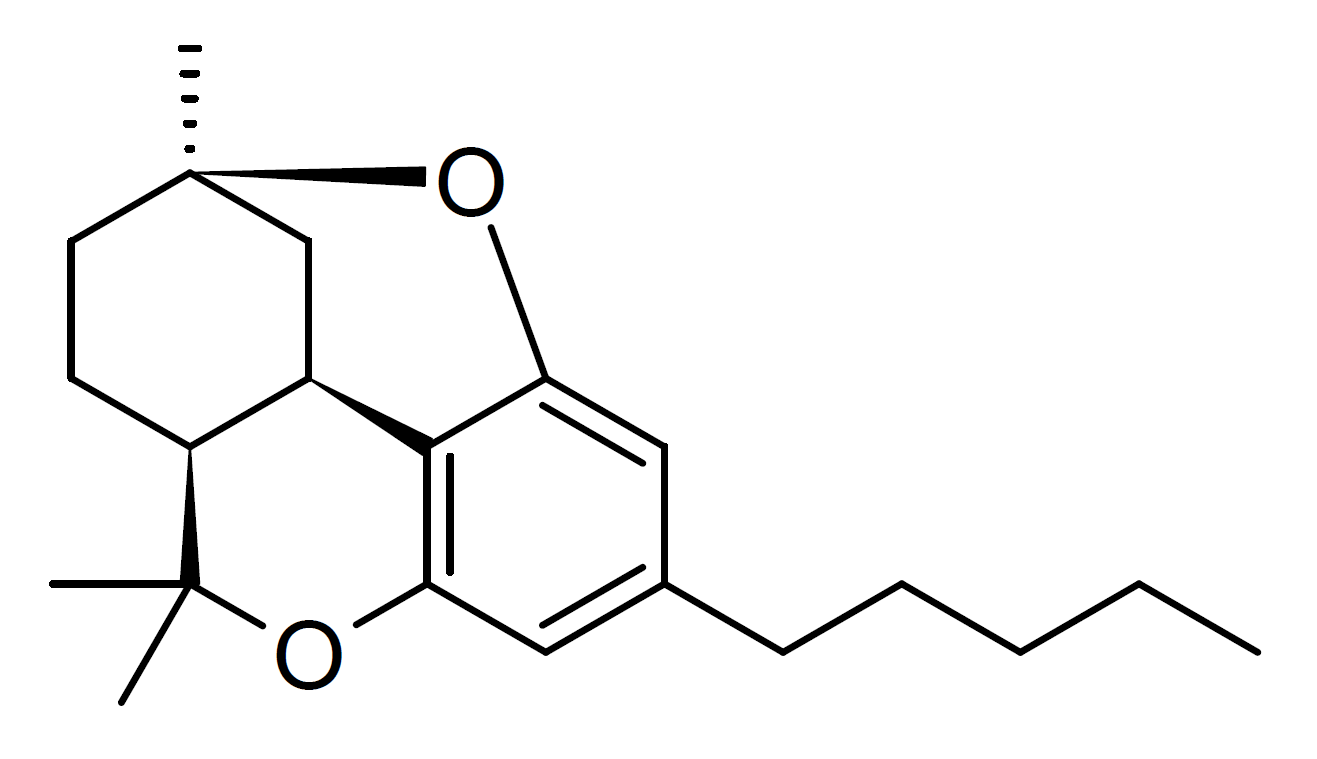

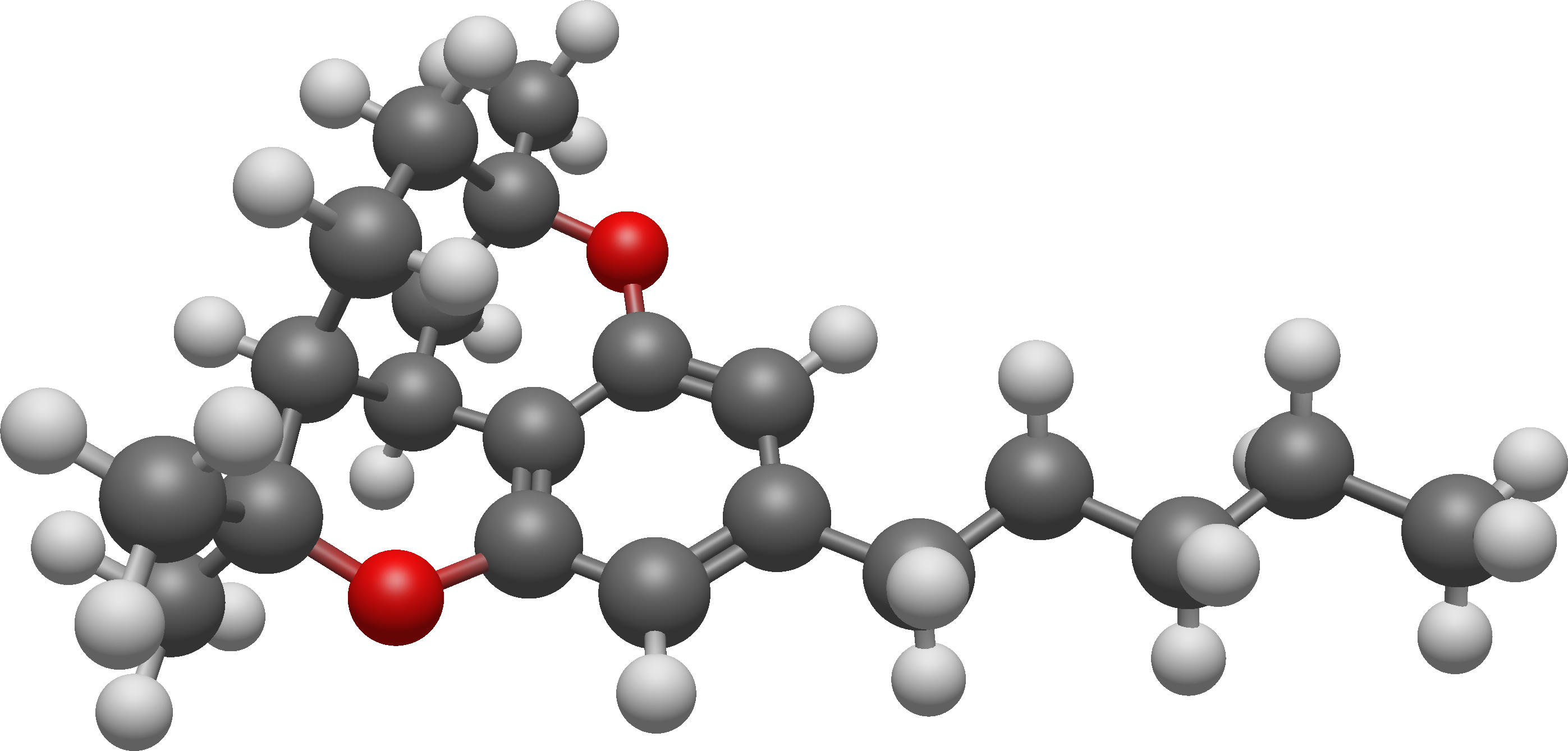

Identifiers
- IUPAC name: 1,5,5-trimethyl-9-pentyl-6,15-dioxatetracyclo[9.3.1.0^{4,13}.0^{7,12}]pentadeca-7(12),8,10-triene
- CAS Number: 19352-64-8 31508-71-1
- PubChem CID: 59444393
- ChemSpider: 58828773
- CompTox Dashboard (EPA): DTXSID10953497

Chemical and physical data
- Formula: C_{21}H_{30}O_{2}
- Molar mass: 314.469 g·mol^{−1}
- 3D model (JSmol): Interactive image
- SMILES: CCCCCc1cc2O[C@@]3(C)C[C@H]4c2c(c1)OC(C)(C)[C@H]4CC3
- InChI: InChI=1S/C21H30O2/c1-5-6-7-8-14-11-17-19-15-13-21(4,23-18(19)12-14)10-9-16(15)20(2,3)22-17/h11-12,15-16H,5-10,13H2,1-4H3; Key:IXJXRDCCQRZSDV-UHFFFAOYSA-N

Cannabicitran (CBTC) is a phytocannabinoid first isolated in 1974 as a trace component of Cannabis sativa. Structurally related compounds can be found in some other plants. It is not psychoactive, but was found to reduce intraocular pressure in tests on rabbits, which may reflect agonist activity at the NAGly receptor (formally GPR18) that is known to be a target of many structurally related cannabinoids.

== See also ==
- 9-OH-HHC
- Cannabichromene (CBC)
- Cannabicyclol (CBL)
- Cannabidiol dimethyl ether (CBDD)
- Cannabielsoin (CBE)
- Cannabigerol (CBG)
- Cannabimovone (CBM)
- Cannabitriol (CBT)
- Isotetrahydrocannabinol (iso-THC)
