= Hydroxytibolone =

Hydroxytibolone may refer to:

- 3α-Hydroxytibolone
- 3β-Hydroxytibolone
