= Cannabichromevarin =

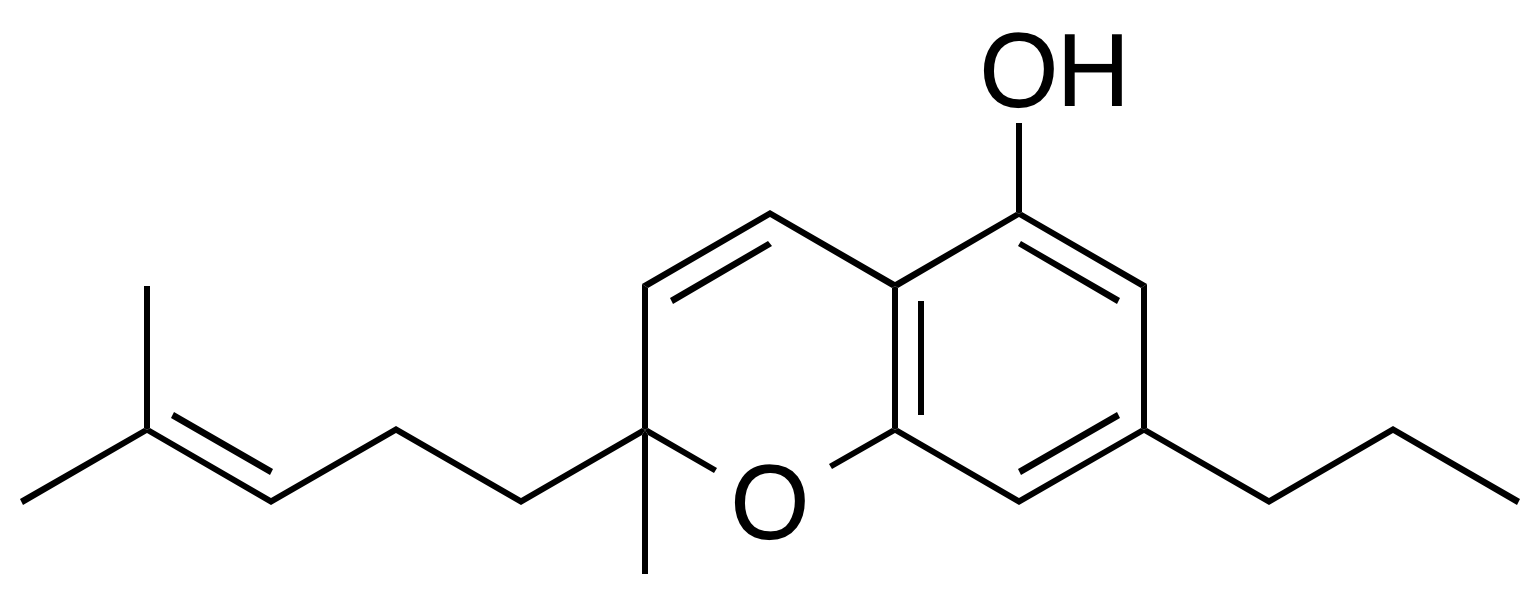

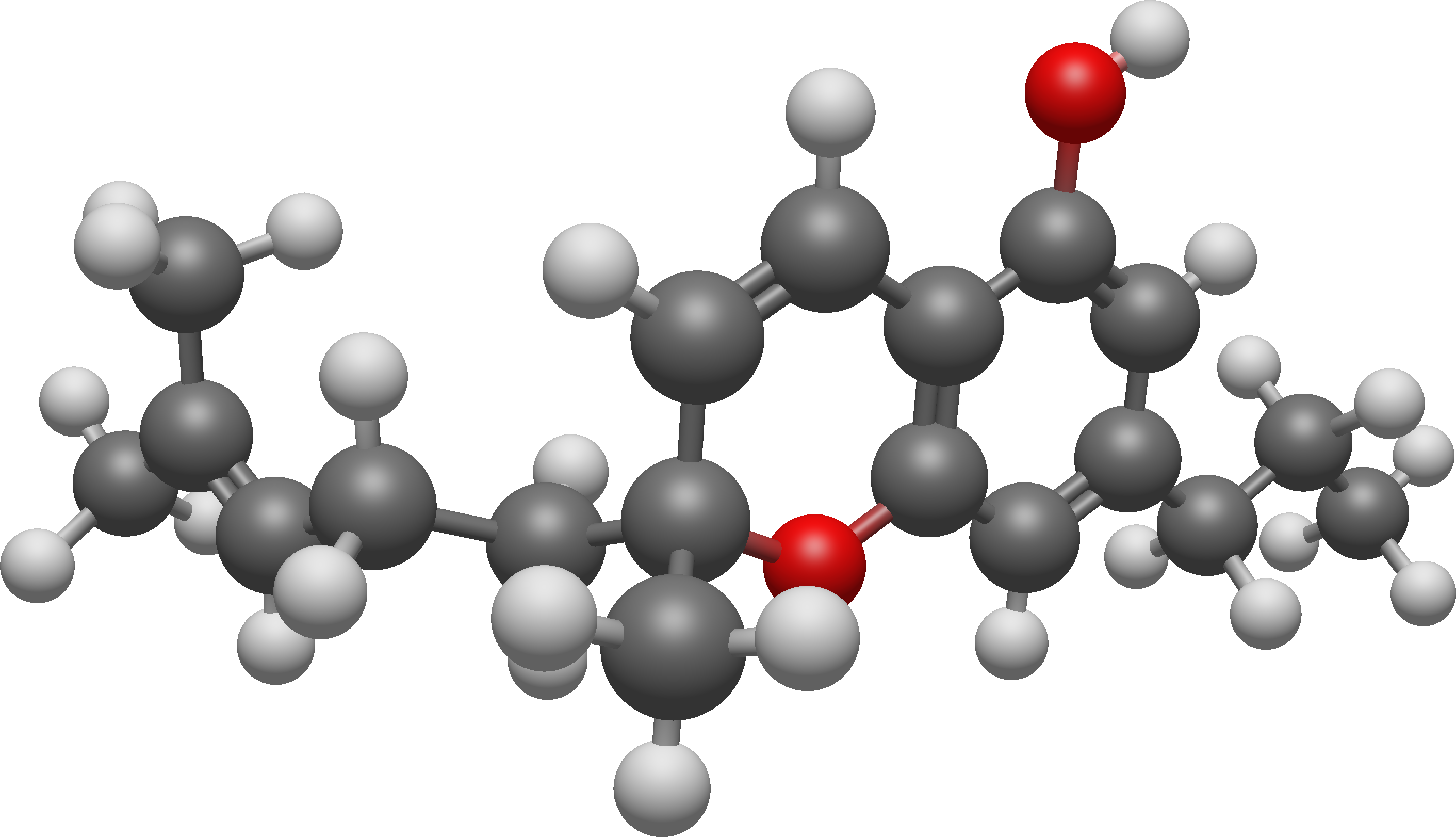

Names
- IUPAC name 2-methyl-2-(4-methylpent-3-enyl)-7-propylchromen-5-ol
- Other names Cannabivarichromene, CBCV

Identifiers
CAS Number	57130-04-8
3D model (JSmol)	Interactive image
ChemSpider	4954183
PubChem CID	6451726
UNII	3Q9WSZ6RI4
CompTox Dashboard (EPA)	DTXSID20961664
- InChI: InChI=1S/C19H26O2/c1-5-7-15-12-17(20)16-9-11-19(4,21-18(16)13-15)10-6-8-14(2)3/h8-9,11-13,20H,5-7,10H2,1-4H3 Key: AAXZFUQLLRMVOG-UHFFFAOYSA-N
- SMILES: CCCC1=CC(=C2C=CC(OC2=C1)(C)CCC=C(C)C)O

Properties
Chemical formula	C_{19}H_{26}O_{2}
Molar mass	286.415 g·mol^{−1}
- Except where otherwise noted, data are given for materials in their standard state (at 25 °C [77 °F], 100 kPa). Infobox references

Cannabichromevarin (CBCV), also known as cannabivarichromene) is one of over 100 variants of cannabinoid chemical compounds that act on cannabinoid receptors. CBCV is a phytocannabinoid found naturally in cannabis, and is a propyl cannabinoid and an effective anticonvulsant and used to treat brain cancer and epilepsy

CBCV was first identified at the University of Nagasaki in 1975 from marijuana from Thailand. CBCV is not thought to be psychoactive or impairing in any way, and is believed to be safe for children and adults and is a compound found in medical marijuana.
