= Tetrahydrocannabutol =

Chemical compound

Δ^{9}-Tetrahydrocannabinol-C4

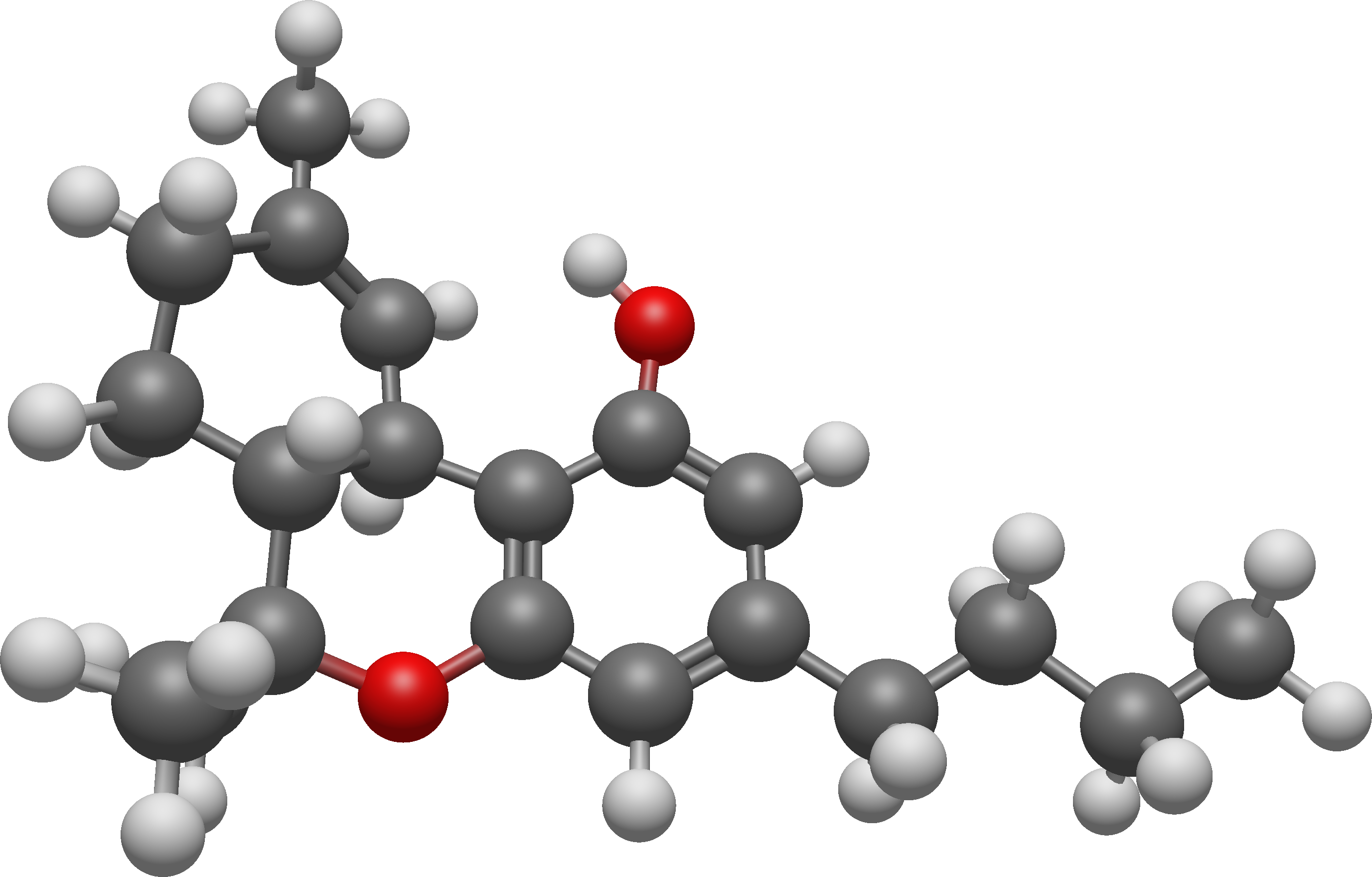

Clinical data
- ATC code: none

Identifiers
- IUPAC name: (−)-(6aR,10aR)-6,6,9-trimethyl-3-butyl-6a,7,8,10a-tetrahydro-6H-benzo[c]chromen-1-ol
- CAS Number: 60008-00-6
- PubChem CID: 6453891
- ChemSpider: 4956237
- UNII: LIC9QAS59U
- ChEMBL: ChEMBL4437290
- CompTox Dashboard (EPA): DTXSID10208712

Chemical and physical data
- Formula: C_{20}H_{28}O_{2}
- Molar mass: 300.442 g·mol^{−1}
- 3D model (JSmol): Interactive image
- SMILES: CCCCC1=CC2=C([C@@H]3C=C(CC[C@H]3C(O2)(C)C)C)C(=C1)O
- InChI: InChI=1S/C20H28O2/c1-5-6-7-14-11-17(21)19-15-10-13(2)8-9-16(15)20(3,4)22-18(19)12-14/h10-12,15-16,21H,5-9H2,1-4H3/t15-,16-/m1/s1; Key:QHCQSGYWGBDSIY-HZPDHXFCSA-N

Δ^{9}-Tetrahydrocannabutol (Δ^{9}-THCB, THC-B, tetrahydrocannabinol-C4, THC-C4, (C4)-Δ^{9}-THC, or butyl-THC) is a phytocannabinoid found in cannabis that is a homologue of tetrahydrocannabinol (THC), the main active component of Cannabis. Structurally, they are only different by the pentyl side chain being replaced by a butyl side chain. THCB was studied by Roger Adams as early as 1942

== Pharmacology ==
Δ^{9}-THCB, showed an affinity for the human CB_{1} (Ki = 15 nM) and CB_{2} receptors (Ki = 51 nM) comparable to that of Δ^{9}-THC. The formalin test in vivo was performed on Δ^{9}-THCB in order to reveal possible analgesic and anti-inflammatory properties. The tetrad test in mice showed a partial agonistic activity of Δ^{9}-THCB toward the CB_{1} receptor. THCB has rarely been isolated from cannabis samples, but appears to be less commonly present than THC or THCV. It is metabolized in a similar manner to THC.

In an analysis by the University of Rhode Island on phytocannabinoids it was found that THC-Butyl had the highest 3C-like protease inhibitor activity against COVID-19 out of all the phytocannabinoids tested within that study but not as high as the antiviral drug GC376 (81% THCB vs. 100% GC376).

== Chemistry ==
Similarly to THC, it has 7 double bond isomers and 30 stereoisomers. The Δ^{8} isomer is known as a synthetic cannabinoid under the code name JWH-130, and the ring-opened analogue cannibidibutol (CBDB) is also known. THC-Butyl can be synthesized from 5-butylresorcinol.

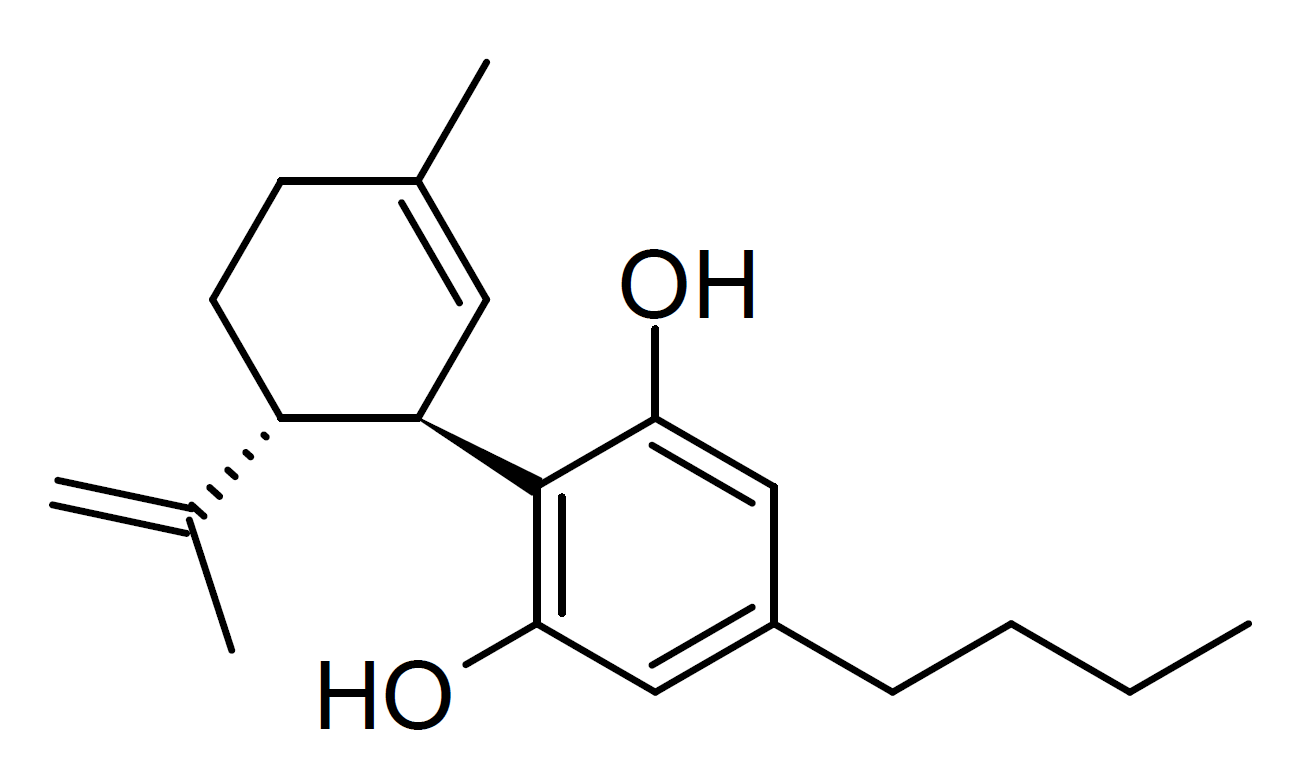
Cannabidibutol (CBDB), 60113-11-3

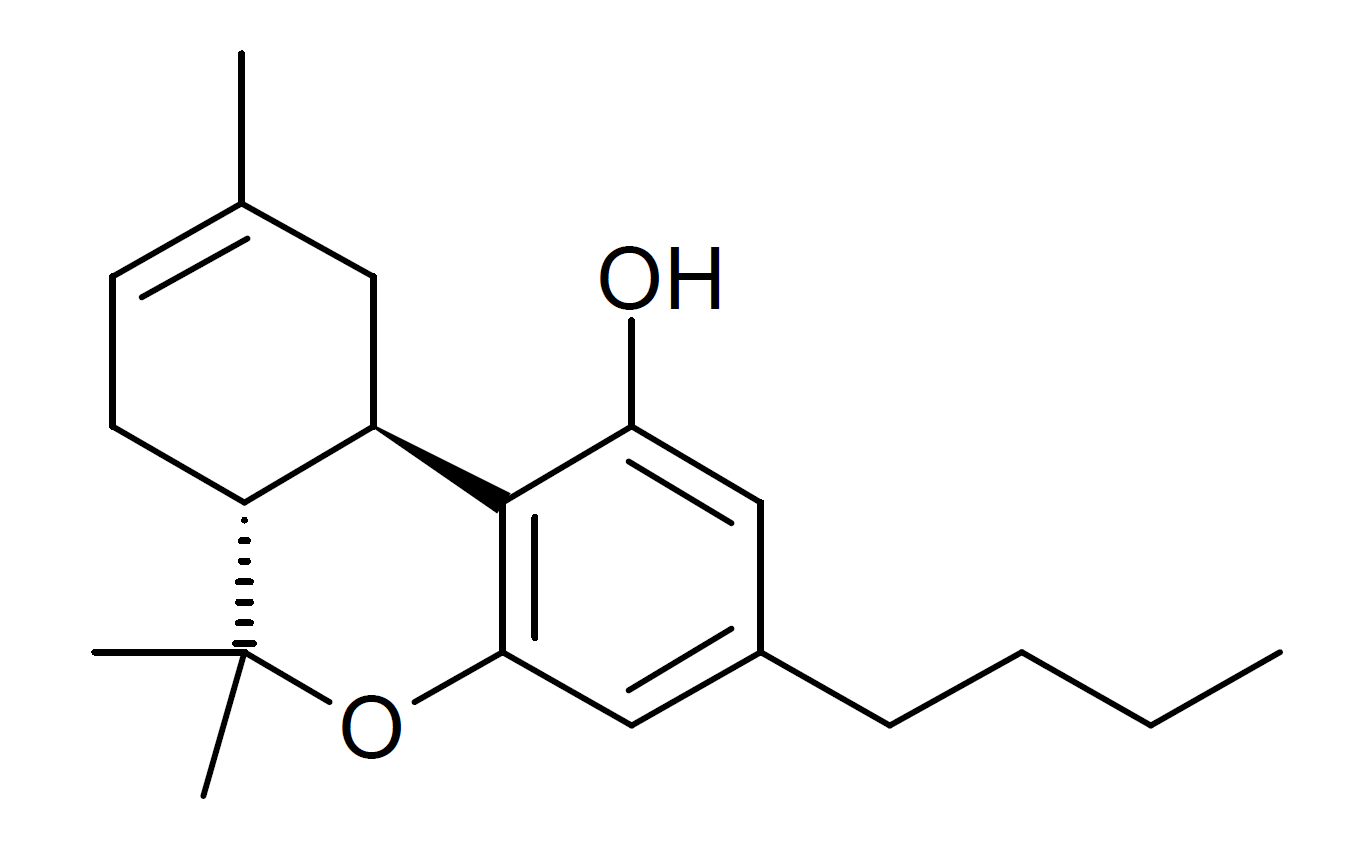
JWH-130 (Δ^{8}-THCB), 51768-59-3

== Legality ==
THCB is not scheduled internationally under the Convention on Psychotropic Substances, but may be controlled under analogue law in some individual jurisdictions as a homologue of THC.

== See also ==
- Cannabis
- Cannabinoid
- Δ9-THCB-O-butanoate
- Hexahydrocannabutol
- Parahexyl
- Perrottetinene
- Tetrahydrocannabihexol
- Tetrahydrocannabiphorol
