= Cannabidiphorol =

Chemical compound

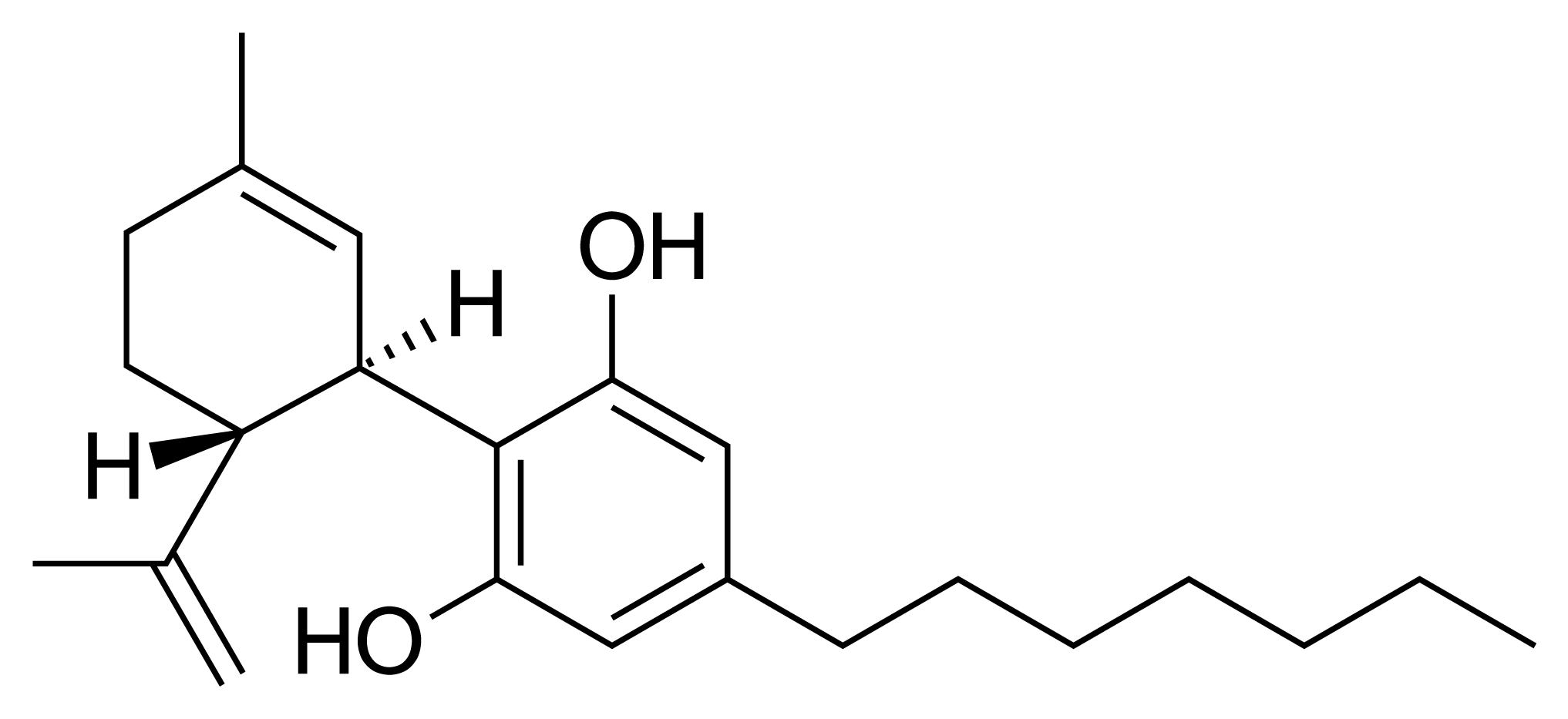

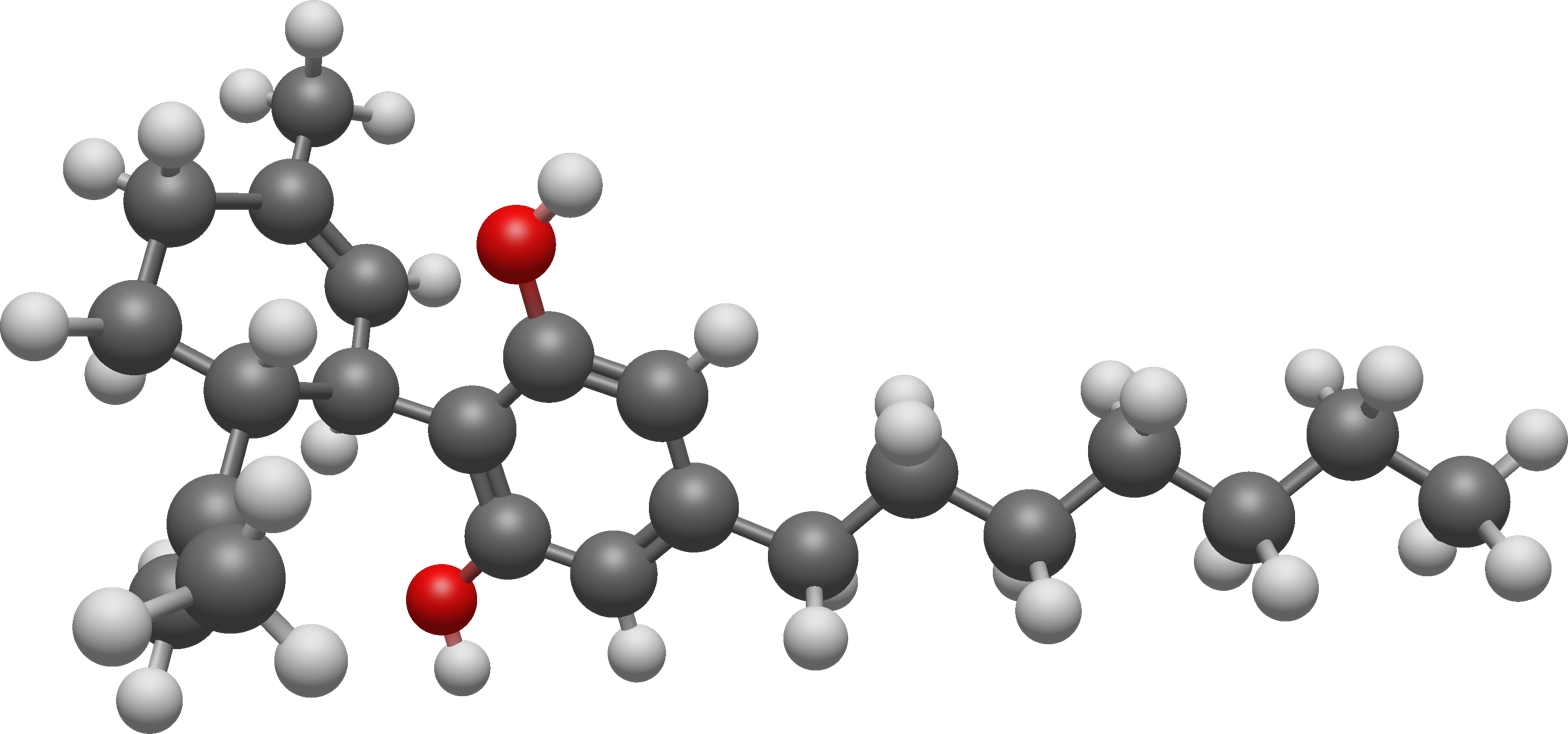

Identifiers
- IUPAC name: 5-heptyl-2-[(1R,6R)-3-methyl-6-(1-methylethenyl)-2-cyclohexen-1-yl]-1,3-benzenediol
- CAS Number: 55824-13-0
- PubChem CID: 49873141
- ChemSpider: 84400576
- CompTox Dashboard (EPA): DTXSID401038844

Chemical and physical data
- Formula: C_{23}H_{34}O_{2}
- Molar mass: 342.523 g·mol^{−1}
- 3D model (JSmol): Interactive image
- SMILES: CC(=C)[C@@H]1CCC(C)=C[C@H]1c1c(O)cc(CCCCCCC)cc1O
- InChI: InChI=1S/C23H34O2/c1-5-6-7-8-9-10-18-14-21(24)23(22(25)15-18)20-13-17(4)11-12-19(20)16(2)3/h13-15,19-20,24-25H,2,5-12H2,1,3-4H3/t19-,20+/m0/s1; Key:GGHRHCGOMWNLCE-VQTJNVASSA-N

Cannabidiphorol, the heptyl-homologue of cannabidiol was identified as a natural phytocannabinoid and named cannabidiphorol (CBDP) in 2019. It had previously been reported as a synthetic compound, but was not identified as a natural product prior to 2019. Recently, CBDP has since gained popularity due to it being synthesized and available on a commercial level.

== Pharmacology ==
=== Pharmacodynamics ===
CBDP shows weak antagonism at both cannabinoid receptors (CB1 and CB2), similar to cannabidiol (CBD). CBD, however, exhibits stronger antagonism at CB2, reaching a 33% maximum response of SR144528 versus CBDP's 23%.

Both cannabinoids act as weak agonists at the serotonin 5-HT1A receptor, contributing to potential anxiolytic effects.

Unlike CBD, CBDP shows no sign of dopamine D2 receptor agonism.

Unexpectedly, CBDP acts as a positive allosteric modulator (PAM) at the MOR, enhancing met-enkephalin signaling by 37%, potentially affecting pain perception.

== See also ==
- CBD-DMH
- Tetrahydrocannabiphorol
