= Cannabidivarin =

Group of stereoisomers

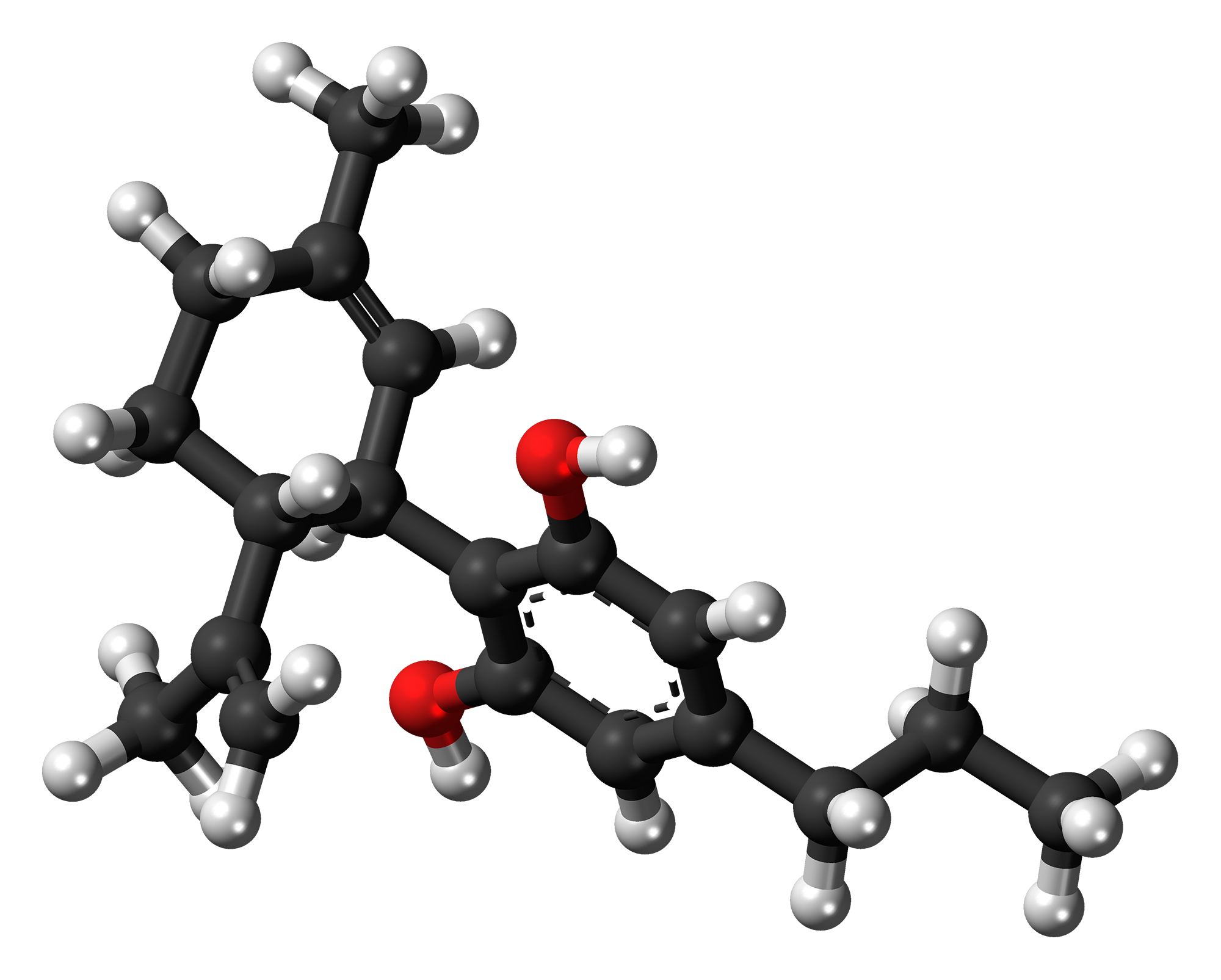

Clinical data
- ATC code: none

Identifiers
- IUPAC name: 2-((1S,6S)-3-methyl-6-(prop-1-en-2-yl) cyclohex-2-enyl)-5-propylbenzene-1,3-diol
- CAS Number: 24274-48-4
- PubChem CID: 11601669
- DrugBank: DB14050
- ChemSpider: 21106275
- UNII: I198VBV98I
- KEGG: C20217
- ChEMBL: ChEMBL2387742
- CompTox Dashboard (EPA): DTXSID70893921
- ECHA InfoCard: 100.236.933

Chemical and physical data
- Formula: C_{19}H_{26}O_{2}
- Molar mass: 286.415 g·mol^{−1}
- 3D model (JSmol): Interactive image
- SMILES: C=C(C)[C@H]2CCC(\C)=C/[C@@H]2c1c(O)cc(CCC)cc1O
- InChI: InChI=1S/C19H26O2/c1-5-6-14-10-17(20)19(18(21)11-14)16-9-13(4)7-8-15(16)12(2)3/h9-11,15-16,20-21H,2,5-8H2,1,3-4H3/t15-,16+/m1/s1; Key:REOZWEGFPHTFEI-CVEARBPZSA-N

Cannabidivarin (CBDV, GWP42006) is a non-intoxicating psychoactive cannabinoid found in Cannabis. It is a homolog (chemistry) of cannabidiol (CBD), with the side-chain shortened by two methylene bridges (CH_{2} units).

Although cannabidivarin (CBDV) is usually a minor constituent of the cannabinoid profile, enhanced levels of CBDV have been reported in feral populations of C. indica ( = C. sativa ssp. indica var. kafiristanica) from northwest India, and in hashish from Nepal.

CBDV demonstrated anticonvulsant in rodent models in a single published study. It was identified for the first time in 1969 by Vollner et al.

Similarly to CBD, it has seven double bond isomers and 30 stereoisomers (see: Cannabidiol#Isomerism). It is not scheduled by Convention on Psychotropic Substances. It is being actively developed by GW Pharmaceuticals (as GWP42006) because of a demonstrated neurochemical pathway for previously observed anti-epileptic and anti-convulsive action. GW has begun several Phase-2 trials for adult epilepsy, for childhood epilepsy and for Prader-Willi Syndrome.

== See also ==
- List of investigational analgesics
- List of investigational Prader–Willi syndrome drugs
