= Δ10-Tetrahydrocannabinol =

Isomer of tetrahydrocannabinol

Δ^{10}-Tetrahydrocannabinol

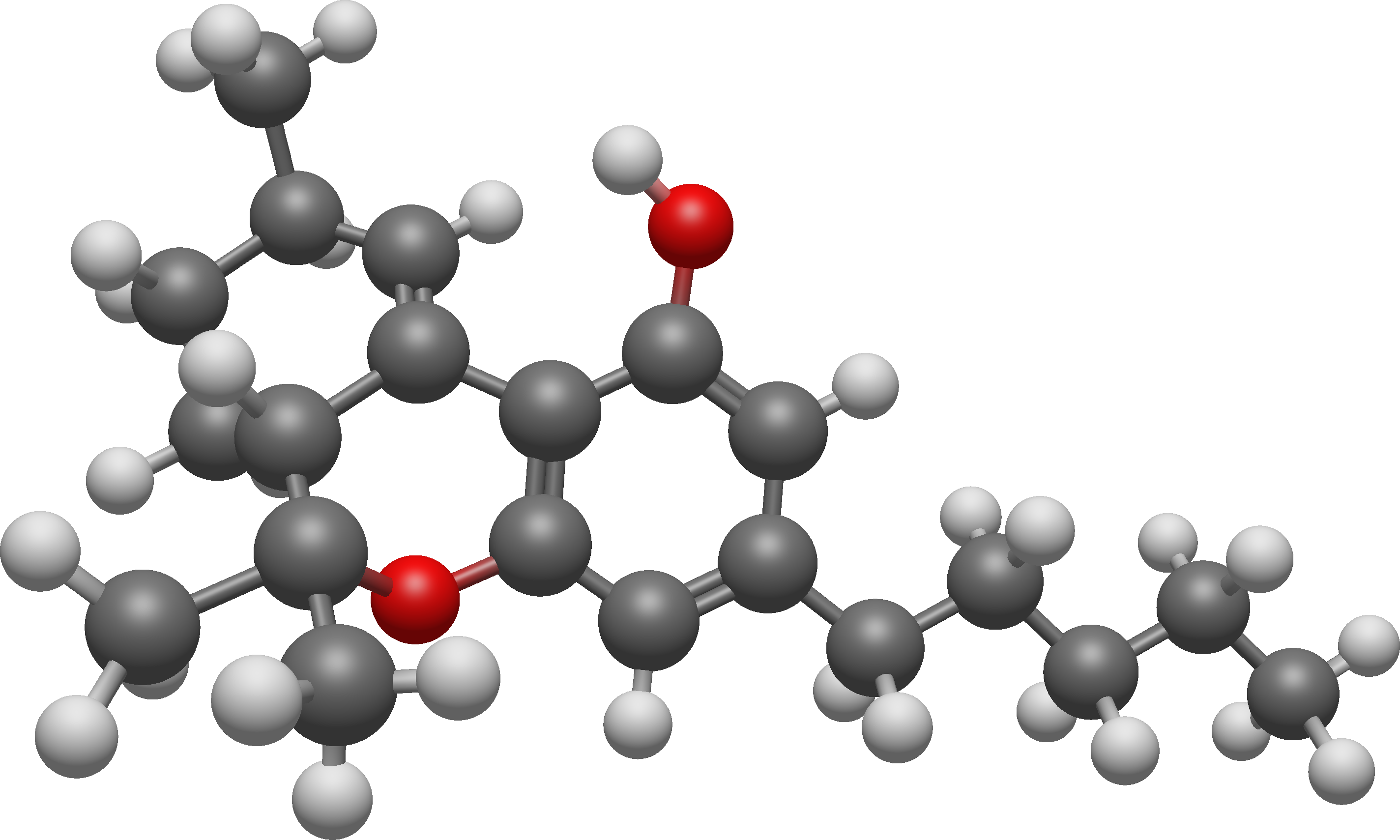

Identifiers
- IUPAC name: 6,6,9-trimethyl-3-pentyl-6a,7,8,9-tetrahydrobenzo[c]chromen-1-ol
- CAS Number: 95543-62-7 (9R) 95588-87-7 (9S)
- PubChem CID: 71440386
- ChemSpider: 30906591
- UNII: X5NJ9Z2UMY
- KEGG: C22740

Chemical and physical data
- Formula: C_{21}H_{30}O_{2}
- Molar mass: 314.469 g·mol^{−1}
- 3D model (JSmol): Interactive image
- SMILES: CCCCCC1=CC(=C2C3=CC(CCC3C(OC2=C1)(C)C)C)O
- InChI: InChI=1S/C21H30O2/c1-5-6-7-8-15-12-18(22)20-16-11-14(2)9-10-17(16)21(3,4)23-19(20)13-15/h11-14,17,22H,5-10H2,1-4H3; Key:YLTWYAXWDLZZCU-UHFFFAOYSA-N

Δ^{10}-Tetrahydrocannabinol (Delta-10-THC, Δ^{10}-THC, alternatively numbered as Δ^{2}-THC) is a positional isomer of tetrahydrocannabinol, discovered in the 1980s. Two epimers have been reported in the literature, with the 9-methyl group in either the (R) or (S) conformation; of these, the (R) epimer appears to be the more active isomer as well as the double bond in the 10th position instead of the 9th maintaining about 30 to 40 percent the potency of delta-9-THC. Δ^{10}-THC has rarely been reported as a trace component of natural cannabis, though it is thought to be a degradation product similar to cannabinol rather than being produced by the plant directly. However, it is found more commonly as an impurity in synthetic delta-8-THC produced from cannabidiol and can also be synthesized directly from delta-9-THC.

== See also ==
- 7,8-Dihydrocannabinol
- 9-OH-HHC
- Delta-3-Tetrahydrocannabinol
- Delta-4-Tetrahydrocannabinol
- Delta-7-Tetrahydrocannabinol
- Delta-6-Cannabidiol
- Hexahydrocannabinol
- THC-O-acetate
