= Δ7-Tetrahydrocannabinol =

Chemical compound

Δ^{7}-Tetrahydrocannabinol

Identifiers
- IUPAC name: (6aR,9S,10aR)-6,6,9-trimethyl-3-pentyl-6a,9,10,10a-tetrahydrobenzo[c]chromen-1-ol
- CAS Number: 162678-94-6
- PubChem CID: 10313569
- ChemSpider: 8489034
- UNII: SSA668ROQJ
- KEGG: C22742
- CompTox Dashboard (EPA): DTXSID801336773

Chemical and physical data
- Formula: C_{21}H_{30}O_{2}
- Molar mass: 314.469 g·mol^{−1}
- 3D model (JSmol): Interactive image
- SMILES: CCCCCC1=CC(=C2[C@@H]3C[C@@H](C=C[C@H]3C(OC2=C1)(C)C)C)O
- InChI: InChI=1S/C21H30O2/c1-5-6-7-8-15-12-18(22)20-16-11-14(2)9-10-17(16)21(3,4)23-19(20)13-15/h9-10,12-14,16-17,22H,5-8,11H2,1-4H3/t14-,16-,17-/m1/s1; Key:WWYMYGIVLCKTBL-DJIMGWMZSA-N

Δ^{7}-Tetrahydrocannabinol (Delta-7-THC, Δ^{7}-THC; alternatively numbered as Δ^{5}-tetrahydrocannabinol, Δ^{5}-THC) is a synthetic isomer of tetrahydrocannabinol. The (6aR,9S,10aR)-Δ^{7}-THC epimer is only slightly less potent than Δ^{9}-THC itself, while the (9R) epimer is much less potent.

== See also ==
- 7,8-Dihydrocannabinol
- Delta-3-Tetrahydrocannabinol
- Delta-4-Tetrahydrocannabinol
- Delta-8-Tetrahydrocannabinol
- Delta-10-Tetrahydrocannabinol
- Hexahydrocannabinol
