= Δ3-Tetrahydrocannabinol =

Chemical compound

Δ^{3}-Tetrahydrocannabinol

Clinical data
- Other names: Delta-3-THC, Δ^{3}-THC, Δ^{6a(10a)}-THC, EA-1477
- Drug class: Cannabinoid

Identifiers
- IUPAC name: (9S)-6,6,9-trimethyl-3-pentyl-7,8,9,10-tetrahydrobenzo[c]chromen-1-ol
- CAS Number: 95720-02-8 7663-50-5 (racemic)
- PubChem CID: 71587360
- ChemSpider: 32700761
- UNII: PYI73UAY3K
- KEGG: C22743
- CompTox Dashboard (EPA): DTXSID40241935

Chemical and physical data
- Formula: C_{21}H_{30}O_{2}
- Molar mass: 314.469 g·mol^{−1}
- 3D model (JSmol): Interactive image
- SMILES: CCCCCC1=CC(=C2C3=C(CC[C@@H](C3)C)C(OC2=C1)(C)C)O
- InChI: InChI=1S/C21H30O2/c1-5-6-7-8-15-12-18(22)20-16-11-14(2)9-10-17(16)21(3,4)23-19(20)13-15/h12-14,22H,5-11H2,1-4H3/t14-/m0/s1; Key:NEBZNJDFIPBXCS-AWEZNQCLSA-N

Δ^{3}-Tetrahydrocannabinol (often abbreviated as delta-3-THC or Δ^{3}-THC) is a synthetic isomer of tetrahydrocannabinol (THC) developed during the original research in the 1940s to develop synthetic routes to the natural products Δ^{8}-THC and Δ^{9}-THC found in cannabis. While the normal trans configuration of THC is in this case flattened by the double bond, it still has two enantiomers as the 9-methyl group can exist in an (R) or (S) conformation. The (S) enantiomer has similar effects to Δ^{9}-THC though with several times lower potency, while the (R) enantiomer is many times less active or inactive, depending on the assay used. It has been identified as a component of vaping liquid products.

== Legality ==
=== United States ===
Delta-3-Tetrahydrocannabinol is federally uncontrolled, but due to its similarities with Delta-9-THC it could be prosecuted under the Federal Analogue Act

==== Arkansas ====
As of June 25, 2025, the U.S. 8th Circuit Court of Appeals overturned a lower court's injunction, allowing Arkansas to enforce its ban on hemp-derived THC products, including Delta-3 THC (listed as Delta-6a10a-THC). This ruling means that Act 629, which classifies Delta-8, Delta-9 (above 0.3%), and Delta-10 THC ("Psychoactive hemp-derived cannabinoids" as stated in Act 629) as Schedule VI controlled substances in the state, is now enforceable. Previously, sales of these products had been temporarily permitted due to the injunction.

== See also ==
- 7,8-Dihydrocannabinol
- Cannabitriol
- Delta-4-Tetrahydrocannabinol
- Delta-7-Tetrahydrocannabinol
- Delta-10-Tetrahydrocannabinol
- Hexahydrocannabinol
- JWH-138
- Parahexyl
