= Cannabicyclol =

Chemical compound

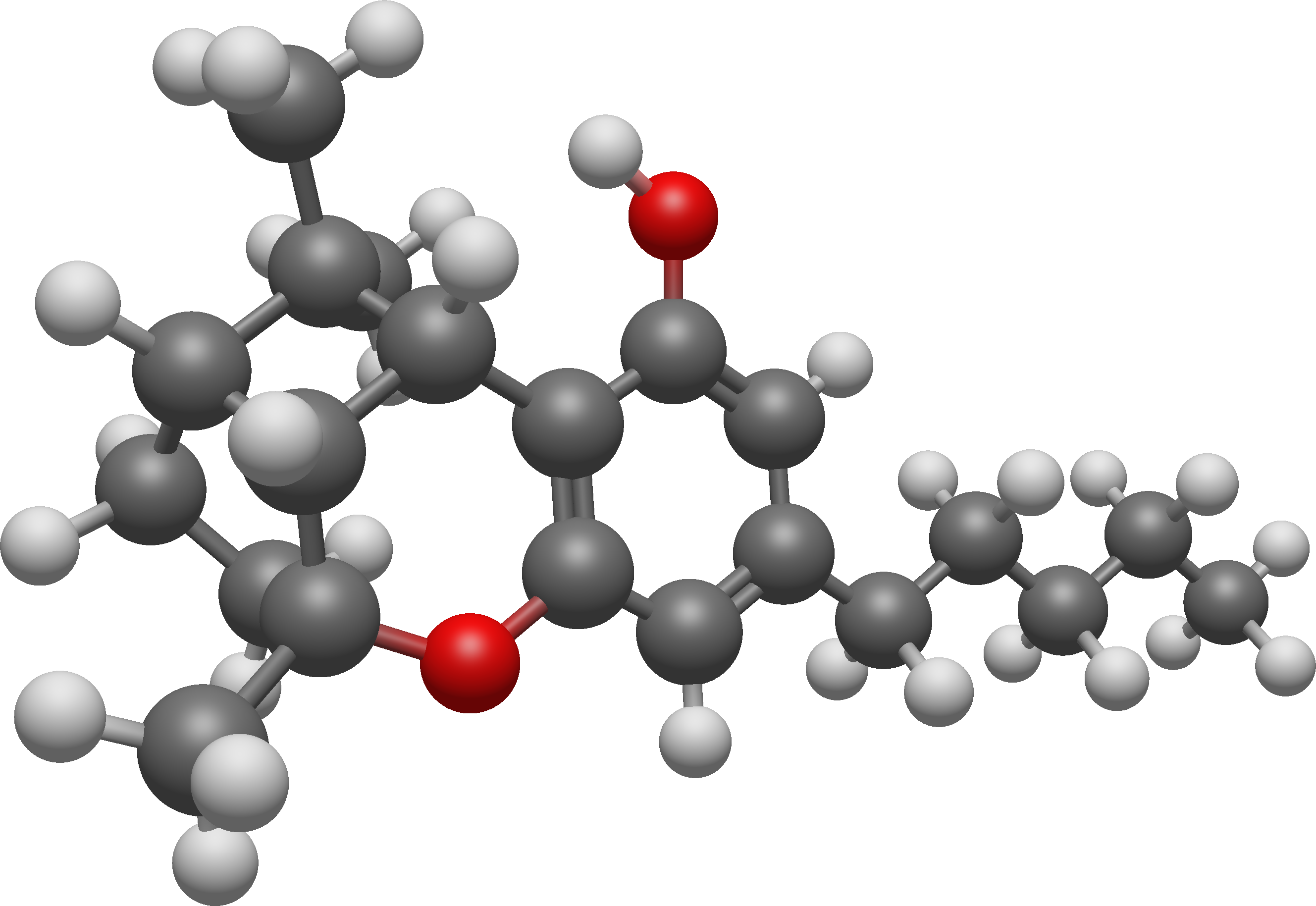

Clinical data
- ATC code: none

Legal status
- Legal status: UN: Unscheduled

Identifiers
- IUPAC name: (1aR-(1a alpha,3a alpha,8b alpha,8c alpha))-1a,2,3,3a,8b,8c-hexahydro-1,1,3a-trimethyl-6-pentyl-1H-4-oxabenzo(f)cyclobut(cd)inden-8-ol
- CAS Number: 21366-63-2
- PubChem CID: 30607
- ChemSpider: 28407
- UNII: MP5WZK8M5U
- ChEMBL: ChEMBL154127
- CompTox Dashboard (EPA): DTXSID301356075 DTXSID70900962, DTXSID301356075

Chemical and physical data
- Formula: C_{21}H_{30}O_{2}
- Molar mass: 314.469 g·mol^{−1}
- 3D model (JSmol): Interactive image
- SMILES: Oc4c1c(OC3(C2C1C(C2CC3)(C)C)C)cc(c4)CCCCC
- InChI: InChI=1S/C21H30O2/c1-5-6-7-8-13-11-15(22)17-16(12-13)23-21(4)10-9-14-18(21)19(17)20(14,2)3/h11-12,14,18-19,22H,5-10H2,1-4H3; Key:IGHTZQUIFGUJTG-UHFFFAOYSA-N

Cannabicyclol (CBL) is a non-psychoactive cannabinoid found in Cannabis. CBL is a degradative product like cannabinol, with cannabichromene degrading into CBL through natural irradiation or under acid conditions. It has been found to be a potent positive allosteric modulator of the serotonin 5-HT_{1A} receptor. CBL is not scheduled under the Convention on Psychotropic Substances.

== See also ==
- Cannabis
- Medical cannabis
