= List of Radula species =

As of November 2024, World Flora Online accepted 236 species in the liverwort genus Radula.

== A ==
- Radula acuminata Steph.
- Radula acuta Mitt.
- Radula acutangula Steph.
- Radula acutiloba Steph.
- Radula aguirrei R.M.Schust. ex M.A.M.Renner
- Radula allisonii Castle
- Radula amentulosa Mitt.
- Radula amoena Herzog
- Radula anceps Sande Lac.
- Radula aneurysmalis (Hook.f. & Taylor) Gottsche, Lindenb. & Nees
- Radula angulata Steph.
- Radula anisotoma M.A.M.Renner
- Radula appressa Mitt.
- Radula aquilegia (Hook.f. & Taylor) Gottsche, Lindenb. & Nees
- Radula assamica Steph.
- Radula australiana K.Yamada
- Radula australis Austin

== B ==
- Radula bahiensis F.R.Oliveira-da-Silva, Ilk.-Borg. & Gradst.
- Radula bischlerae Gradst. & Ilk.-Borg.
- Radula bolanderi Gottsche ex Steph.
- Radula boninensis Furuki & K.Yamada
- Radula borneensis Steph.
- Radula brasilica K.Yamada
- Radula buccinifera (Hook.f. & Taylor) Gottsche, Lindenb. & Nees

== C ==
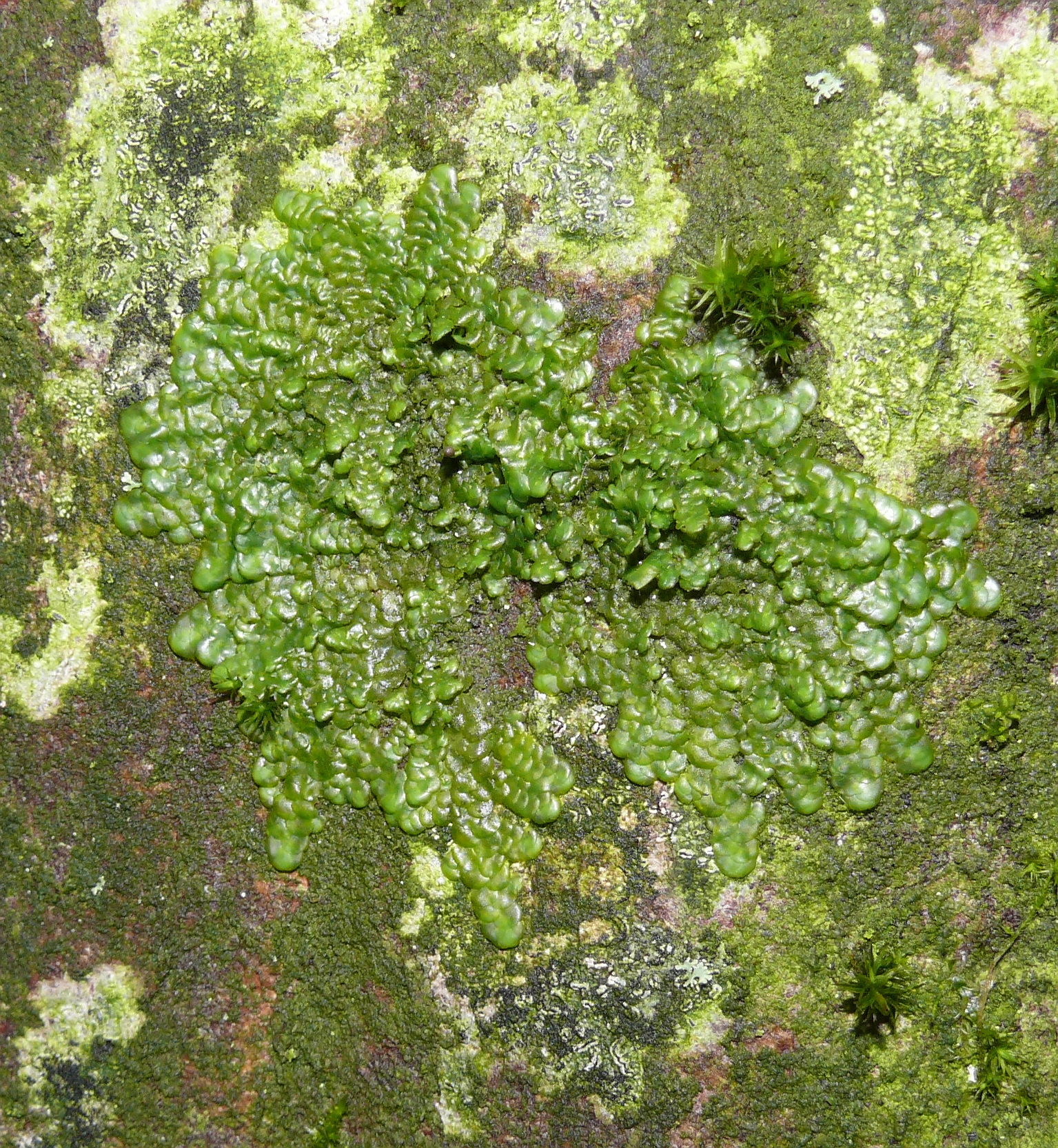
Radula complanata

- Radula caduca K.Yamada
- Radula camerunensis Pócs & Döbbeler
- Radula campanulata Lindenb. & Gottsche
- Radula carringtonii J.B.Jack
- Radula castlei Grolle
- Radula cavifolia Hampe
- Radula ceylanica K.Yamada
- Radula cochabambaensis K.Yamada
- Radula complanata (L.) Dumort.
- Radula conferta Lindenb. & Gottsche
- Radula constricta Steph.
- Radula cordata Mitt.
- Radula costaricensis Gottsche
- Radula crenulata Schiffn.
- Radula cubensis K.Yamada
- Radula curvilobula M.L.So
- Radula cuspidata Steph.

== D ==
- Radula decora Gottsche ex Steph.
- Radula decurrens Mitt.
- Radula deflexilobula Promma, L.N.Zhang & R.L.Zhu
- Radula demissa M.A.M.Renner
- Radula densifolia Castle
- Radula diaphana K.I.Goebel
- Radula diversifolia Steph.
- Radula dolabrata K.Yamada

== E ==
- Radula eggersii K.Yamada
- Radula elliottii Castle
- Radula emarginata K.Yamada & Piippo
- Radula episcia Spruce
- Radula evansii Castle
- Radula evelynae K.Yamada

== F ==
- Radula falcata Steph.
- Radula fauriana Steph.
- Radula fendleri Gottsche ex Steph.
- Radula fernandezana Steph.
- Radula fissifolia Steph.
- Radula flaccida Lindenb. & Gottsche
- Radula flavifolia (Hook.f. & Taylor) Gottsche, Lindenb. & Nees
- Radula floridana Castle
- Radula forficata M.A.M.Renner
- Radula formosa (C.F.W.Meissn. ex Spreng.) Nees
- Radula fujitae Furuki
- Radula fulvifolia (Hook.f. & Taylor) Gottsche, Lindenb. & Nees

== G ==
- Radula galapagona Steph.
- Radula gedena Steph.
- Radula gradsteinii K.Yamada
- Radula grandifolia Steph.
- Radula grandilobula Promma & Chantanaorr.
- Radula grandis Steph.
- Radula grevilleana Taylor
- Radula grollei K.Yamada & Piippo
- Radula guyanensis K.Yamada

== H ==
- Radula hainanensis L.N.Zhang & R.L.Zhu
- Radula hastata Steph.
- Radula hattorii K.Yamada
- Radula hawaiica M.L.So
- Radula hedingeri K.I.Goebel
- Radula helix (Hook.f. & Taylor) Gottsche, Lindenb. & Nees
- Radula hicksiae K.Yamada
- Radula holtii Spruce
- Radula husnotii Castle

== I ==
- Radula imposita M.A.M.Renner
- Radula inflexa Gottsche ex Steph.
- Radula inouei K.Yamada
- Radula involvens Spruce
- Radula iwatsukiana K.Yamada
- Radula iwatsukii K.Yamada

== J ==
- Radula jamaicensis Pearson
- Radula jamesonii Taylor
- Radula japonica Gottsche ex Steph.
- Radula javanica Gottsche
- Radula jonesii Bouman, Dirkse & K.Yamada
- Radula jovetiana K.Yamada
- Radula juddii K.Yamada

== K ==
- Radula kilgourii M.A.M.Renner
- Radula kinabaluensis K.Yamada
- Radula kitagawae K.Yamada
- Radula kojana Steph.
- Radula koponenii K.Yamada & Piippo
- Radula kurzii Steph.

== L ==
- Radula lacerata Steph.
- Radula laxiramea Steph.
- Radula leiboldii Steph.
- Radula lewisii K.Yamada
- Radula ligula Steph.
- Radula lindenbergiana Gottsche ex C.Hartm.
- Radula lingulata Gottsche
- Radula longiloba K.Yamada
- Radula longispica Steph.
- Radula loriana Castle

== M ==
- Radula macrodonta Stephani
- Radula madagascariensis Gottsche
- Radula mammosa Spruce
- Radula marginata Gottsche, Lindenb. & Nees
- Radula marojezica E.W.Jones
- Radula mauiensis M.L.So
- Radula mexicana Lindenb. & Gottsche
- Radula microloba Gottsche
- Radula microlobula Castle
- Radula minutilobula K.Yamada & Piippo
- Radula mittenii Steph.
- Radula mizutanii K.Yamada
- Radula morobeana K.Yamada & Piippo
- Radula multiamentula E.A.Hodgs.
- Radula multiflora Gottsche ex Schiffn.
- Radula myriopoda M.A.M.Renner

== N ==
- Radula neotropica Castle
- Radula nigra Pearson
- Radula nilgiriensis Udar & D.Kumar
- Radula norrisii K.Yamada & Piippo
- Radula notabilis M.A.M.Renner
- Radula novaehollandiae Hampe ex Lehm.
- Radula novivrieseana K.Yamada
- Radula novocaledonica Hürl. & K.Yamada
- Radula novocaledoniensis K.Yamada
- Radula novoguineensis K.Yamada & Piippo
- Radula nudicaulis Steph.
- Radula nymanii Steph.

== O ==
- Radula obconica Sull.
- Radula obscura Mitt.
- Radula obtusiloba Steph.
- Radula oceania Castle
- Radula ocellata K.Yamada
- Radula okamurana Steph.
- Radula onraedtii K.Yamada
- Radula opaciuscula (Spruce) Castle
- Radula oreopsis M.A.M.Renner
- Radula ornata E.A.Br. & Pócs
- Radula ovalilobula K.Yamada
- Radula oyamensis Steph.

== P ==
- Radula paganii Castle
- Radula pallens (Sw.) Nees ex Mont.
- Radula pandei Udar & Dh.Kumar
- Radula patens K.Yamada
- Radula peruviana K.Yamada
- Radula philippinensis K.Yamada
- Radula physoloba Mont.
- Radula pinnata Pócs
- Radula pinnulata Mitt.
- Radula plicata Mitt.
- Radula pocsii K.Yamada
- Radula portoricensis Steph.
- Radula prolifera Arnell
- Radula protensa Lindenb.
- Radula pseudoflaccida E.W.Jones
- Radula pseudoscripta M.A.M.Renner
- Radula pseudostachya Spruce
- Radula psychosis M.A.M.Renner
- Radula pugioniformis M.A.M.Renner
- Radula pulchella Mitt. ex Steph.
- Radula punctata Steph.
- Radula pusilla Spruce

== Q ==
- Radula quadrata Gottsche
- Radula queenslandica K.Yamada

== R ==
- Radula ratkowskiana K.Yamada
- Radula recubans Taylor
- Radula reflexa Nees & Mont.
- Radula renneri F.R.Oliveira-da-Silva, Ilk.-Borg. & Gradst.
- Radula retroflexa Taylor
- Radula rhombiloba Steph.
- Radula robinsonii Steph.
- Radula rupicola K.Yamada

== S ==
- Radula saccatiloba Steph.
- Radula santacruziana K.Yamada & Gradst.
- Radula scariosa Mitt.
- Radula schofieldiana K.Yamada
- Radula shaefer-verwimpii K.Yamada
- Radula sharpii K.Yamada
- Radula sinskeana K.Yamada
- Radula sinuata Gottsche ex Steph.
- Radula smithii F.R.Oliveira-da-Silva, Ilk.-Borg. & Gradst.
- Radula socorana Gerola
- Radula sonsonensis Steph.
- Radula splendida M.A.M.Renner & Devos
- Radula squarrosa K.Yamada
- Radula stellatogemmipara C.Gao & Y.Huan Wu
- Radula stenocalyx Mont.
- Radula strangulata Hook.f. & Taylor
- Radula striata Mitt. ex Steph.
- Radula subacuminata L.N.Zhang & R.L.Zhu
- Radula subinflata Lindenb. & Gottsche
- Radula subsquarrosa S.W.Arnell
- Radula sullivantii Austin
- Radula sumatrana Steph.

== T ==
- Radula tabularis Steph.
- Radula tasmanica Steph.
- Radula taylori Steph.
- Radula tectiloba Steph.
- Radula tenera Mitt. ex Steph.
- Radula tenuis K.Yamada
- Radula thiersiae K.Yamada
- Radula tjibodensis K.I.Goebel
- Radula tokiensis Steph.
- Radula tonitrua Pócs & M.A.M.Renner

== U ==
- Radula underwoodii Castle
- Radula uvifera (Hook.f. & Taylor) Gottsche, Lindenb. & Nees

== V ==
- Radula van-zantenii K.Yamada
- Radula varilobula Castle
- Radula venezuelensis K.Yamada
- Radula ventricosa Steph.
- Radula verrucosa K.Yamada
- Radula vieillardii Gottsche ex Steph.
- Radula visianica C.Massal.
- Radula voluta Taylor ex Gottsche, Lindenb. & Nees
- Radula vrieseana Sande Lac.

== W ==
- Radula weymouthiana Steph.
- Radula wichurae Steph.
- Radula wrightii Castle

== X ==
- Radula xalapensis Nees & Mont.

== Y ==
- Radula yamadae F.R.Oliveira-da-Silva & Ilk.-Borg.
- Radula yangii K.Yamada
- Radula yanoella R.M.Schust.
