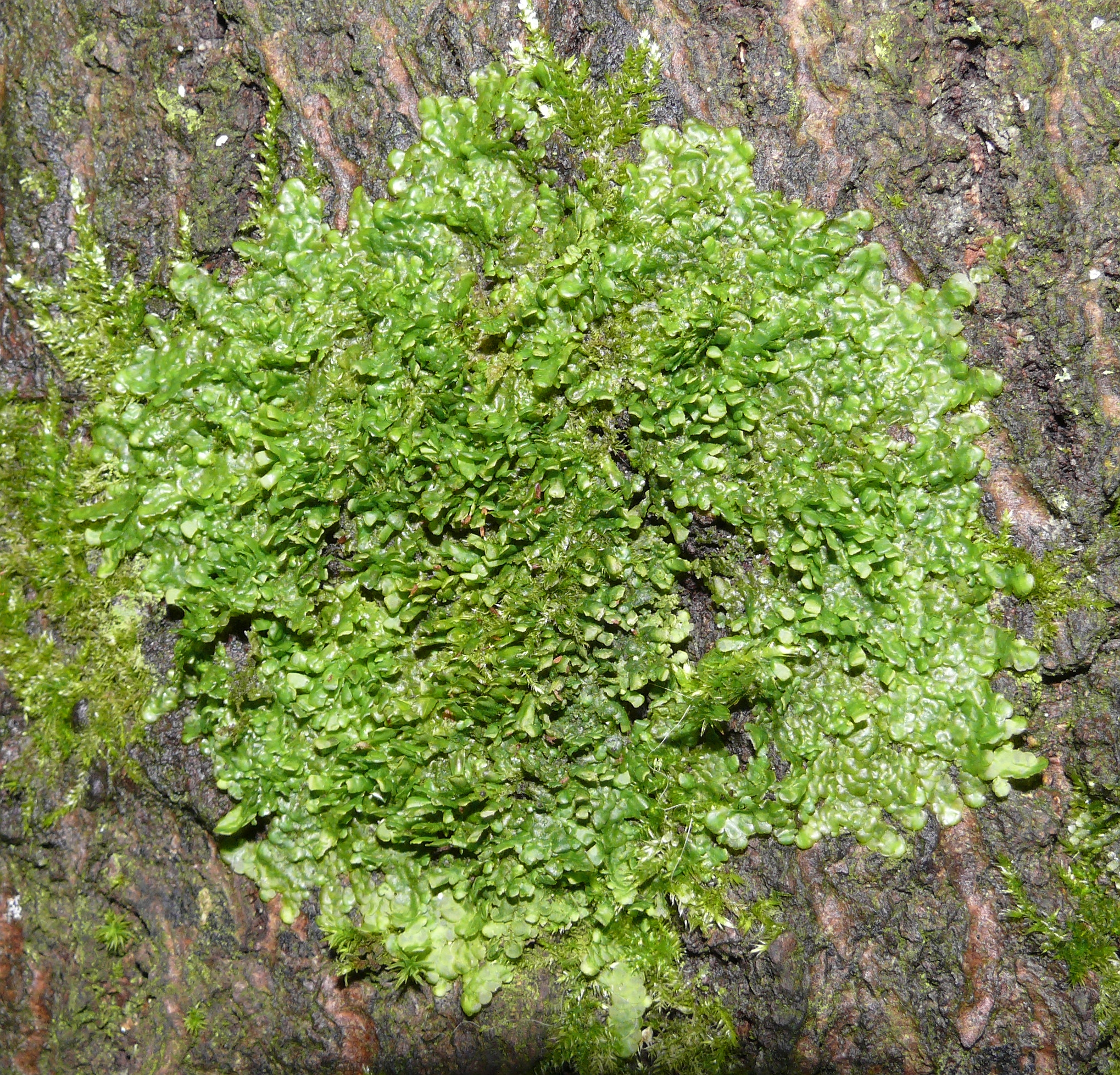
- Radula complanata

Scientific classification
- Kingdom: Plantae
- Division: Marchantiophyta
- Class: Jungermanniopsida
- Order: Radulales; R.M.Schust.
- Family: Radulaceae; Müll.Frib.
- Genus: Radula; Dumort.

Type species
- Radula complanata (L.) Dumort.

Synonyms
- Candollea Raddi; Martinellius Gray; Patarola Léman; Patarola Trevis.; Stephanina Kuntze

= Radula (plant) =

Radula Temporal range: Cenomanian–Present

Genus of liverworts

Radula is a genus of liverwort in the family Radulaceae. The genus includes 248 species of small plants that typically grow as green, scaly patches on tree trunks, logs, or rocks in moist environments. It is distinguished from other liverworts by several unique features, including the production of root-like structures (rhizoids) exclusively from leaf surfaces and characteristic branching patterns. The plants have rounded, overlapping leaves consisting of two unequal lobes, with considerable variation in structure across species. Following a major taxonomic revision in 2022, the genus comprises five subgenera with distributions ranging from tropical to temperate regions. The oldest known fossil species, R. cretacea, found in Burmese amber, dates to the Cenomanian age, though molecular evidence suggests the genus originated in the Triassic period, around 228 million years ago.

== Taxonomy ==
The genus Radula was historically subject to different taxonomic interpretations. In 1936, Hepstead Castle published a broad interpretation of the genus, including all species with perianths on short branches in the subgenus Cladoradula, which made the subgenus nearly worldwide in distribution. However, in the late 1970s and early 1980s, several bryologists including Eustace Wilkinson Jones (1977), Kohsaku Yamada (1979), and Rudolf Mathias Schuster (1980) challenged this broad interpretation. These researchers advocated for a return to Richard Spruce's original narrower concept from 1885, which was supported by detailed morphological characteristics including stem anatomy and patterns of leaf insertion.

The classification of Radula species has been challenging historically due to the genus's high diversity combined with relatively simple morphology. The first infrageneric classification was published by Franz Stephani in 1884, dividing the then-known 92 species into 12 sections based on readily observable characteristics like leaf shape and growth habits. Almost simultaneously, Richard Spruce proposed dividing the genus into just two subgenera based on reproductive features. Stephani revised his treatment in 1910 to include seven sections for 220 species, but did not incorporate Spruce's subgeneric divisions. Castle's 1936 work expanded on Spruce's system, placing species into either subgenus Cladoradula (15 species) or Acroradula (197 species), with the latter further divided into 11 sections. This classification was formally described by Riclef Grolle in 1970 but was criticised by Jones (1977) as being artificial and potentially misleading regarding relationships between species.

In 2022, molecular phylogenetics studies led to a major taxonomic revision of Radulaceae. Two former subgenera of Radula were elevated to genus rank based on their ancient divergence times and distinct morphological characteristics. The subgenus Cladoradula, comprising seven species, was found to have diverged during the late Permian period about 263 million years ago, making it one of the oldest lineages within the family. These species, including the former R. boryana and R. perrottetii, were transferred to the new genus Cladoradula. Similarly, the monospecific subgenus Dactyloradula was elevated to genus rank, with R. brunnea becoming Dactyloradula brunnea. Both new genera are distinguished from Radula by having a subepidermis and transverse rather than longitudinal lobule insertion. The remaining five subgenera continue to be recognised within Radula:

- Amentuloradula: Found primarily in Asia, Australasia, and Oceania. Many species produce distinctive amentulose (reduced-leaf) branches.
- Metaradula: Primarily tropical in distribution but extends into southern temperate regions.
- Odontoradula: Mostly confined to Asia, Australasia, and Oceania. Some species are characterised by acute leaf lobes and the presence of two pairs of female bracts.
- Radula: Has a subcosmopolitan range.
- Volutoradula: Largely limited to tropical regions but extends into southern temperate areas.

The genus shows considerable morphological and anatomical diversity across these subgenera, including variations in lobule shape, stem anatomy, oil-body morphology, shoot architecture, and reproductive structures.

== Description ==
Radula species are leafy liverworts that typically appear as a scaly, green surface on tree trunks, logs, or rocks in sheltered, moist outdoor environments. The plants have several distinctive characteristics that set them apart from other liverworts. Unlike most related genera, they lack small leaves (underleaves) on their lower surface. Instead, they produce root-like structures (rhizoids) exclusively from their leaf surfaces, a feature unique to this genus.

The leaves are rounded and overlapping, consisting of two unequal lobes. The smaller lobe (lobule) is folded beneath the larger one, and the shape of these lobules varies considerably among species. Each leaf cell typically contains one or two large, brown oil bodies that nearly fill the cell. The plants show a characteristic growth pattern called Radula-type branching, only producing a different type of branch (Lejeunea-type) when the growing tip is damaged. The overall architecture of the plants varies considerably among species, from simple unbranched shoots to complex, regularly branched forms. Stem structure also varies significantly between species, particularly in the arrangement and characteristics of their internal cells. When reproducing, they produce flattened protective structures (perianths) around their reproductive organs, which can vary from short to long depending on the species. The spore-producing structures (sporophytes) show considerable diversity: their capsules vary in size and shape, can split open in either straight or spiral patterns, have different types of wall thickening, and produce varying numbers of spores. The spores themselves also differ among species in size and surface patterns. This high degree of morphological variation across the genus is unusual among liverworts.

== Reproduction and evolution ==
Studies of Radula species have revealed patterns in how these liverworts reproduce and adapt over time. While most species reproduce with separate male and female plants (a condition called dioecy), some species have evolved to have both male and female reproductive organs on the same plant (called monoecy). This shift to combined sexes appears to have happened multiple times independently in different Radula species, suggesting it provided evolutionary advantages.

Species that grow on various surfaces (facultative epiphytes) were more likely to evolve combined sexes compared to species that grow only on trees or leaves (obligate epiphytes). This may be because species growing exclusively on trees face unique challenges – they need to spread to new trees but also establish themselves successfully in an environment where moisture levels can change rapidly. These tree-dwelling species tend to reproduce by breaking off fragments of their plant body rather than producing specialised reproductive structures called gemmae. This strategy allows them to skip the vulnerable early growth stage that gemmae must go through, though it limits how far they can spread.

The genus originated in the late Jurassic period, with most existing species emerging between the Cretaceous and Eocene periods. While some groups within Radula are found worldwide, others are restricted to specific regions – some groups are mostly found in Australasia, others in Central and South America, and others in tropical regions of the Old World. The current distribution of some Radula groups appears to have been shaped by the ancient breakup of the supercontinent Gondwana, as evidenced by the timing of their evolutionary splits coinciding with continental separation events. This is particularly noteworthy because liverworts typically produce tiny spores that can be carried long distances by wind, which usually erases such ancient geographic patterns. The restricted ranges of some Radula groups appear to be due to their environmental preferences being conserved over evolutionary time, rather than an inability to disperse to new areas.

== Fossil record ==
Several species of Radula are known from fossilized tree resin (amber). The oldest fossil species is Radula cretacea from the Cenomanian aged Burmese amber of Myanmar, belonging to subgenus Odontoradula. Molecular evidence suggests that the genus arose during the Triassic, around 227.8 Ma, and the crown group began to diversify during the Early Jurassic, around 176.3 Ma. As of November 2024, World Flora Online lists Radula cretacea as unplaced.

Three species have been identified from Baltic amber and Bitterfeld amber deposits: R. baltica, R. oblongifolia, and R. sphaerocarpoides. Baltic amber specimens date to the Eocene period (around 35–47 million years ago), while the age of Bitterfeld amber remains debated – it may be either Eocene or late Oligocene (24–25 million years ago) in age. R. oblongifolia and R. sphaerocarpoides are found in both amber deposits, suggesting these morphological forms persisted for several million years, though they may represent multiple biological species that appear similar. In 2024, two additional species, R. oblongifolia and R. tikhomirovae, were reported from Rovno amber, dating back to the late Eocene. The first Radula fossil ever described was R. sphaerocarpoides, identified in 1853 from Baltic amber.

Another fossil species, R. steerei, is known from Dominican amber of Miocene age. Radula is the second most diverse liverwort genus found in Baltic and Bitterfeld amber, after Frullania which has nine species. However, since these amber deposits formed from conifer resin, the fossils may only represent species that grew on these trees, while other Radula species that lived primarily on other plant hosts may not have been preserved.

== Chemistry ==
Genus Radula is chemically distinct from other liverworts because it produces unique compounds called bibenzyls and their derivatives. These are organic molecules made up of two connected benzene rings with various chemical modifications. The most common compounds found in Radula species are 3,5-dihydroxy-2-(3-methyl-2-butenyl)bibenzyl and 2-geranyl-3,5-dihydroxybibenzyl, which often form the basic structure for more complex molecules in these plants.

Of particular interest is the presence of compounds similar to those found in cannabis (cannabinoids) in some Radula species. For example, Radula marginata produces perrottetinene, a compound that has psychoactive properties similar to THC (tetrahydrocannabinol, the main psychoactive component in cannabis). Research has shown that perrottetinene can cross the blood-brain barrier and cause effects like lowered body temperature and reduced movement in laboratory studies.

Many compounds isolated from Radula species show various biological activities. These include antimicrobial effects against various bacteria and fungi, cytotoxic (cell-killing) effects against certain cancer cell lines, antioxidant properties, anti-inflammatory effects, and activities affecting blood vessels. Some of these compounds have shown potential medical applications, though research is still in early stages.

While most liverworts produce many terpenoids (a class of aromatic compounds common in plants), Radula species generally contain relatively few, with some exceptions among Portuguese species that are rich in these compounds. Many Radula species also contain α-tocopherol (a form of vitamin E), which may help protect their other chemical compounds from oxidation. The presence of α-tocopherol is particularly important because many of the other compounds in these plants are unstable and susceptible to breaking down when exposed to air.

== Species ==
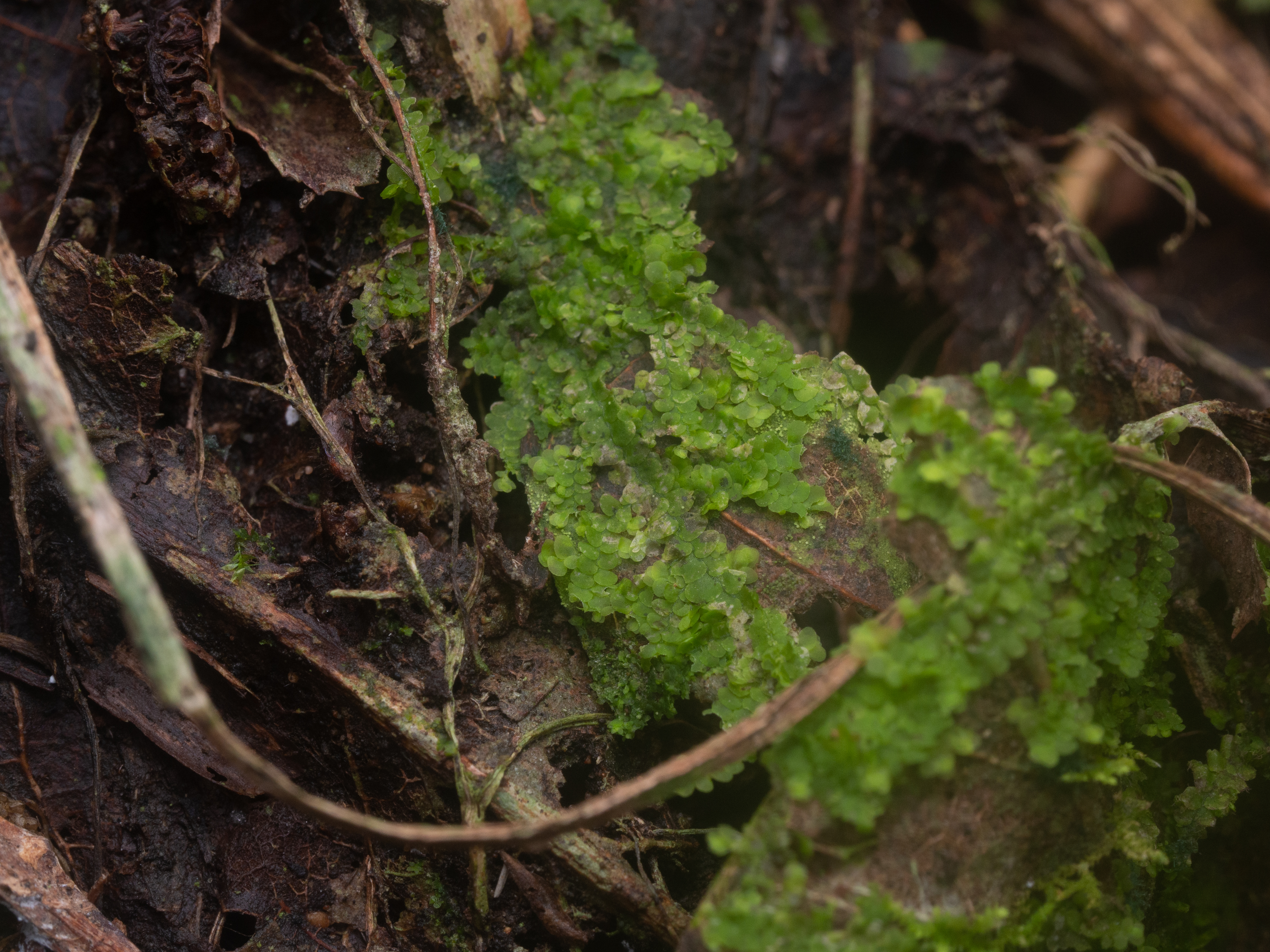
Unidentified Radula species from Gunung Merapi National Park, Indonesia

As of November 2024, the Catalogue of Life accepts 248 species, 2 subspecies, and 12 varieties in Radula. See List of Radula species, for the full list. Selected species are as follows.

- Radula boninensis Furuki & K.Yamada
- Radula carringtonii J.B.Jack
- Radula cavifolia Hampe
- Radula complanata (L.) Dumort.
- Radula deflexilobula Promma, L.N.Zhang et R.L.Zhu
- Radula demissa M.A.M.Renner
- Radula javanica Gottsche
- Radula jonesii Bouman, Dirkse & Yamada
- Radula kojana Stephani
- Radula laxiramea Stephani
- Radula marginata Gottsche, Lindenb. & Nees
- Radula obtusiloba Stephani
- Radula visianica C. Massal.
