= C24H28O2 =

The molecular formula C_{24}H_{28}O_{2} (molar mass: 348.48 g/mol, exact mass: 348.2089 u) may refer to:

- Arotinoid acid (TTNPB)
- Bexarotene (Targretin)
- Machaeriol A
- Perrottetinene
- SC-4289
