= Cladoradula perrottetii =

Scientific classification
- Kingdom: Plantae
- Division: Marchantiophyta
- Class: Jungermanniopsida
- Order: Radulales
- Family: Radulaceae
- Genus: Cladoradula
- Species: C. perrottetii

Binomial name
- Cladoradula perrottetii (Gottsche ex Steph.) M.A.M.Renner, Gradst., Ilk.-Borg. & F.R.Oliveira-da-Silva

Synonyms
- Radula perrottetii Gottsche ex Steph.; Radula valida Steph.; Radula gigantea Horik.

Species of liverwort

Cladoradula perrottetii is a species of liverwort is the family Radulaceae. It is distributed across tropical and subtropical Southeast Asia, occurring in Thailand, Sumatra, Taiwan and Japan. It contains the small molecule perrottetinene, a cannabinoid, and other secondary metabolites of scientific interest including marchantin A.

== Taxonomy ==
Cladoradula perrottetii was originally described by the German bryologist Franz Stephani in 1884 as Radula perottetii. The species was long classified in the genus Radula within subgenus Cladoradula. In 2022, Renner and colleagues conducted a molecular phylogenetics study that revealed the subgenus Cladoradula represents one of the oldest lineages within the family Radulaceae, having diverged from other members during the late Permian period. Based on this ancient divergence time and distinct morphological characteristics including a multistratose stem cortex and transverse lobule insertion, Cladoradula was elevated to genus rank. As a result, Radula perrottetii was transferred to the genus Cladoradula as Cladoradula perrottetii. The species remains in the family Radulaceae.

== Description ==
Cladoradula perrottetii is a small plant that grows in an irregularly branching pattern. Its stem has a complex structure composed of 10–14 layers of cells when viewed in cross-section. The stem contains two distinct types of cells: an outer layer (cortex) of small, thick-walled brown cells, and an inner core (medulla) of larger, clear cells with reinforced corners called trigones.

The leaves of C. perrottetii have two distinct parts: a larger upper lobe and a smaller lower lobule. The upper lobe is egg-shaped with a broadly rounded tip and smooth edges. It is large enough to completely cover the stem's width and sometimes extends beyond it. The leaf cells have thin walls but are strengthened at their corners with large nodular trigones. The lower lobule is triangular to egg-shaped and measures between one-third to one-half the length of the upper lobe. It covers about three-quarters of the stem's width or sometimes extends beyond it.

When examined under a scanning electron microscope, the leaf surface shows fine, irregular grooves that connect to form a net-like pattern. This feature was not previously known, as it cannot be seen under a regular light microscope.

The species does not produce reproductive structures called gemmae. Male reproductive structures (androecia) appear at the ends of branches with 5–12 pairs of overlapping specialized leaves called bracts.

== Distribution and habitat ==
Cladoradula perrottetii grows as an epiphyte (a plant that grows on other plants) in moist, shaded environments. It has been found in several Asian countries including: India (Eastern Himalayas, Western Ghats, Central India, and the Andaman and Nicobar Islands), China, Indonesia, Japan, Nepal, Taiwan, and Thailand. The species has been documented at various elevations, with specimens found as low as 35 m (115 ft) above sea level in the Nicobar Islands.
