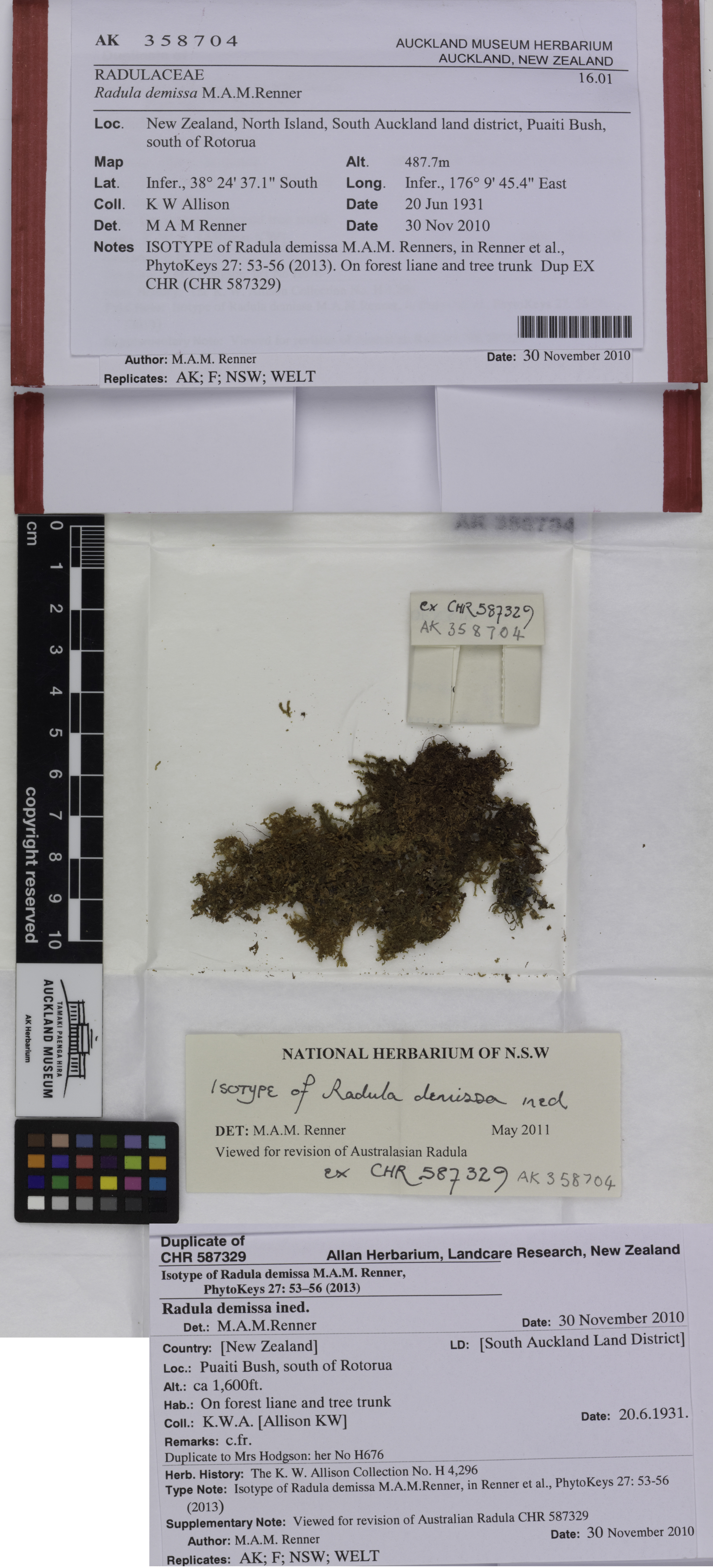

Scientific classification
- Kingdom: Plantae
- Division: Marchantiophyta
- Class: Jungermanniopsida
- Order: Radulales
- Family: Radulaceae
- Genus: Radula
- Species: R. demissa

Binomial name
- Radula demissa M.A.M.Renner

Synonyms
- Radula epiphylla Colenso

= Radula demissa =

Species of liverwort

Radula demissa is a species of liverwort in the family Radulaceae. It occurs in southeastern Australia and New Zealand, where it grows as an epiphyte in temperate rainforest environments.

== Description ==
Radula demissa forms interwoven mats of shoots that are 1.0–2.0 mm wide and up to 40 mm long. The shoots are regularly pinnately branched in male plants and sterile female plants, but become pseudodichotomous in fertile female plants due to the production of paired innovations below the female reproductive structures.

The leaf lobes are positioned obliquely and spread upward away from the stem, completely covering the dorsal stem surface. The lobules are rhombic to widely rhombic, occupying one-eighth to one-sixth of the lobe area. The leaf cells are rounded-oblong, containing two or three ellipsoidal oil bodies that fill the cell lumen.

The species is dioicous, having separate male and female plants. Male plants produce antheridia on indeterminate branches, while female plants develop perianths that are 3200–3800 μm long.

== Distribution and habitat ==
This species is found in southeastern Australia (Victoria and Tasmania) and throughout New Zealand. It inhabits cool temperate and warm-temperate rainforests, where it typically grows as an epiphyte on tree trunks, branches, and twigs. In very humid conditions, it may also grow as an epiphyll on fern fronds.

In New Zealand, common host trees include Melicytus ramiflorus and Beilschmiedia tawa. The species often grows alongside other bryophytes including Radula plicata, Radula allisonii, Archilejeunea olivacea, and various species of Cheilolejeunea.

Although Radula demissa is yet to receive a formal conservation assessment, it was assigned a provisional status of "Not Threatened" in 2021.

== Variation ==
Radula demissa shows morphological variation between forest and alpine populations. Alpine forms tend to have more remote leaves compared to forest forms, and possess a small auricle at the dorsal base of the stem insertion that is absent in forest populations. Additionally, genetic studies have revealed reciprocally monophyletic geographic clades between New Zealand and Tasmanian populations, suggesting limited gene flow across the Tasman Sea.

== Similar species ==
Radula demissa can be distinguished from the similar species R. buccinifera by several characteristics. The leaves of R. demissa are obliquely-patent and overlap across the dorsal stem surface, while in R. buccinifera the leaves lie in plane alongside the stem. The lobules in R. demissa typically have a curved keel with strong inflation along its length, whereas R. buccinifera has lobules with a straight keel and weaker inflation.
