= Isotetrahydrocannabinol =

Phytocannabinoid compound

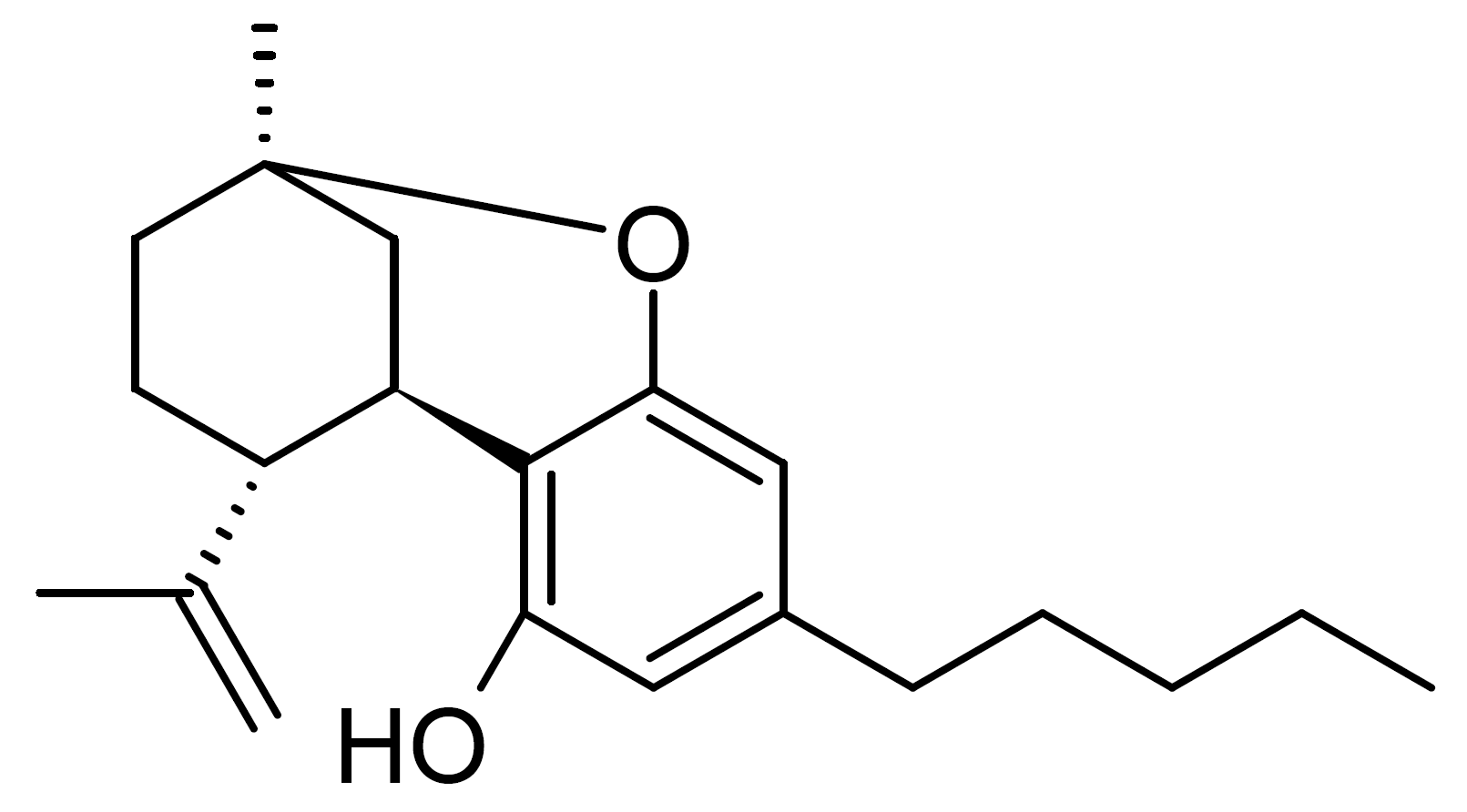

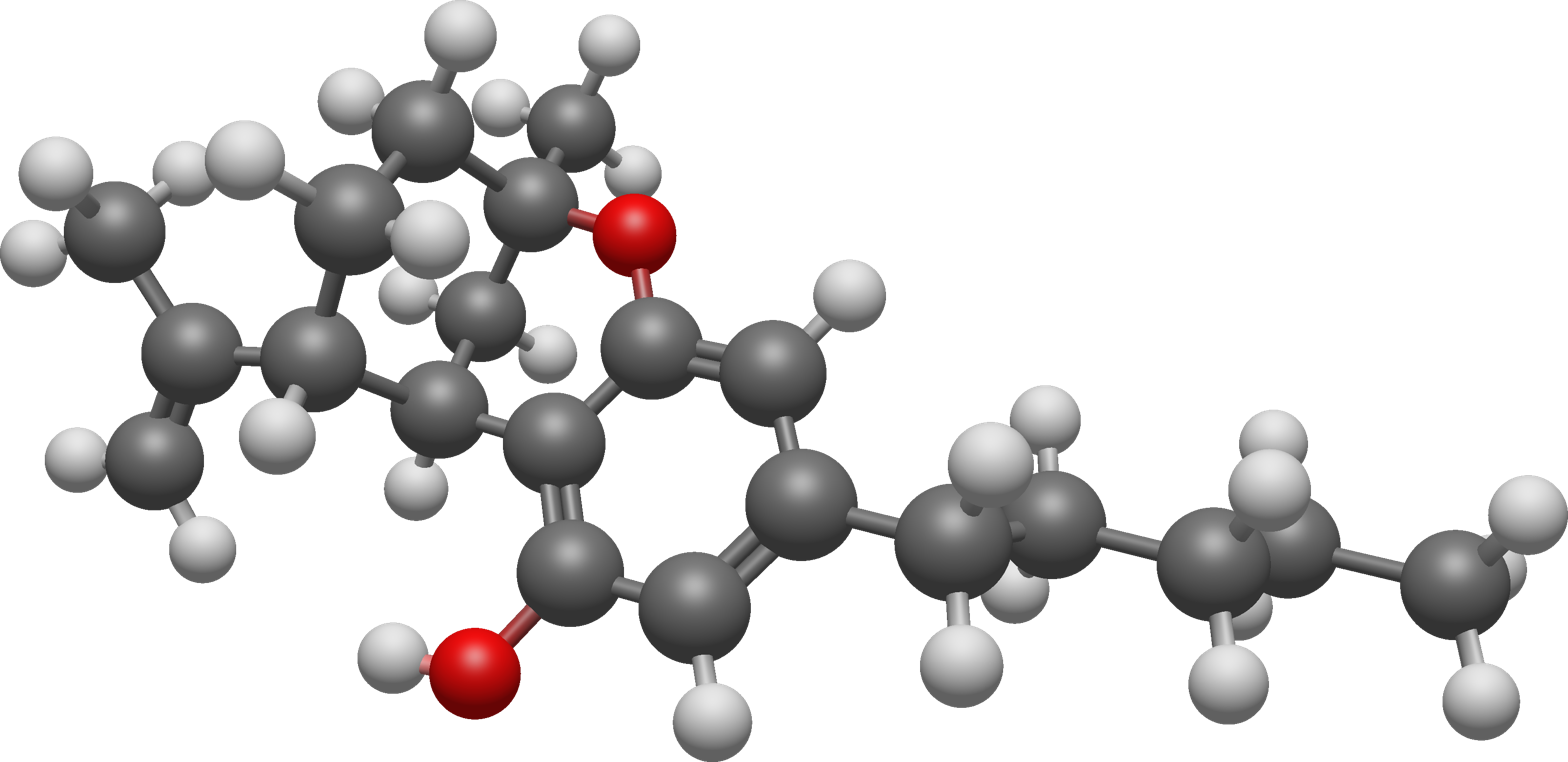

Identifiers
- IUPAC name: (1R,12R)-9-Methyl-5-pentyl-12-prop-1-en-2-yl-8-oxatricyclo[7.3.1.0^{2,7}]trideca-2,4,6-trien-3-ol
- CAS Number: 23050-47-7
- PubChem CID: 166057750

Chemical and physical data
- Formula: C_{21}H_{30}O_{2}
- Molar mass: 314.469 g·mol^{−1}
- 3D model (JSmol): Interactive image
- SMILES: C=C(C)[C@@H]1CCC2(C)C[C@H]1c1c(cc(CCCCC)cc1O)O2
- InChI: InChI=1S/C21H30O2/c1-5-6-7-8-15-11-18(22)20-17-13-21(4,23-19(20)12-15)10-9-16(17)14(2)3/h11-12,16-17,22H,2,5-10,13H2,1,3-4H3/t16-,17?,21?/m0/s1; Key:NUXUDGMVYZUFNQ-BQJIDLTASA-N

Isotetrahydrocannabinol (iso-THC or Δ^{8}-Isotetrahydrocannabinol) is a phytocannabinoid commonly found as a component in synthetic THC which has been made from acid-catalyzed cyclization of cannabidiol. iso-THC can be described as the upper cyclization product of CBD, while THC is the lower cyclization product of CBD. Its pharmacology has not been studied, though it is commonly found in commercially marketed Δ^{8}-THC products.

Via a migration of the exocyclic double bond iso-THC can easily rearrange to delta-4(8)-iso-THC, which can also be found in Δ^{8}-THC products.

iso-THC can be found as an impurity in pharmaceutical dronabinol.

== See also ==
- Abeo-HHC acetate
- Cannabicyclol
- Cannabielsoin
- Cis-THC
- Exo-THC
