= Cis-THC =

Cis enantiomer of tetrahydrocannabidiol

cis-THC
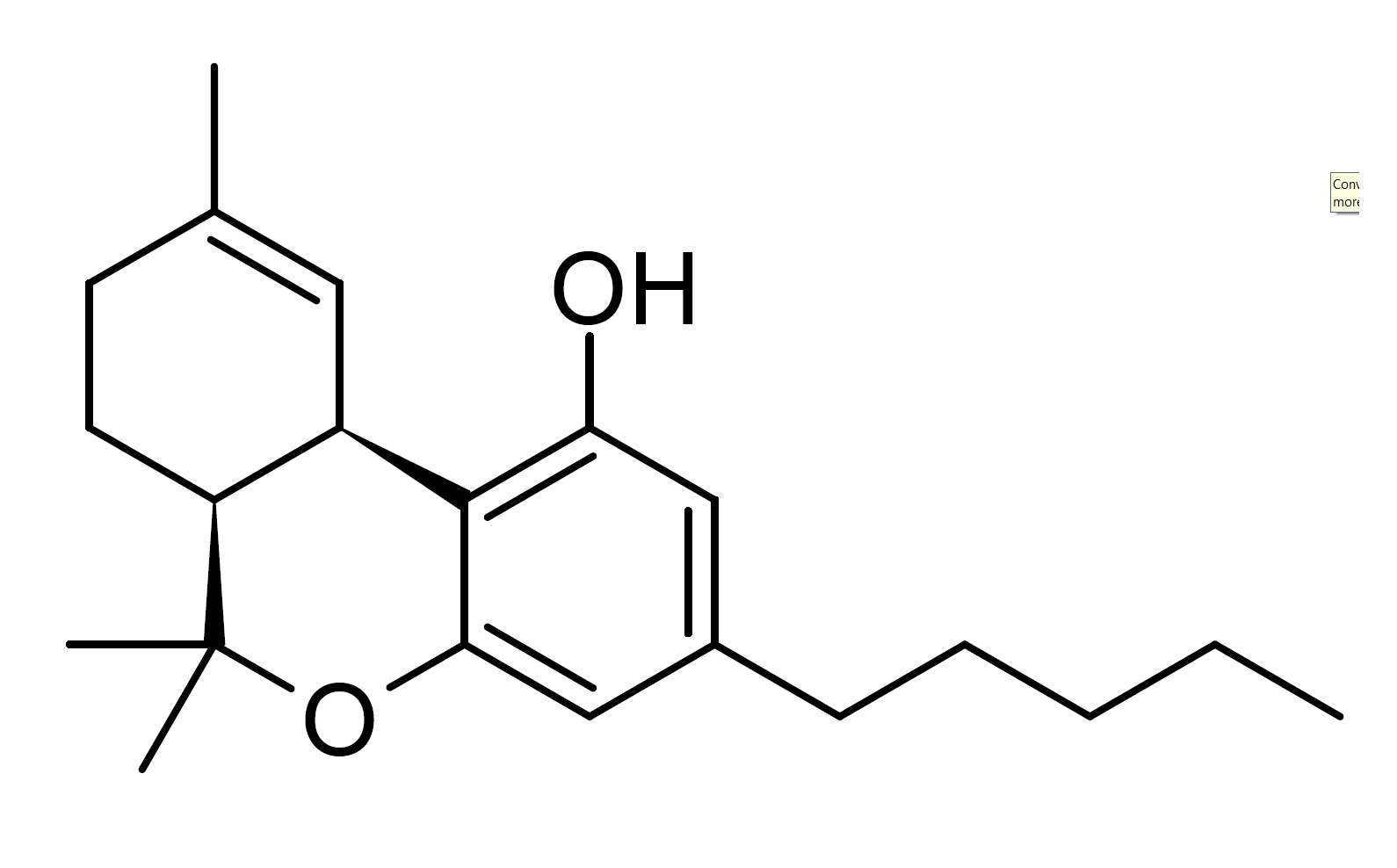

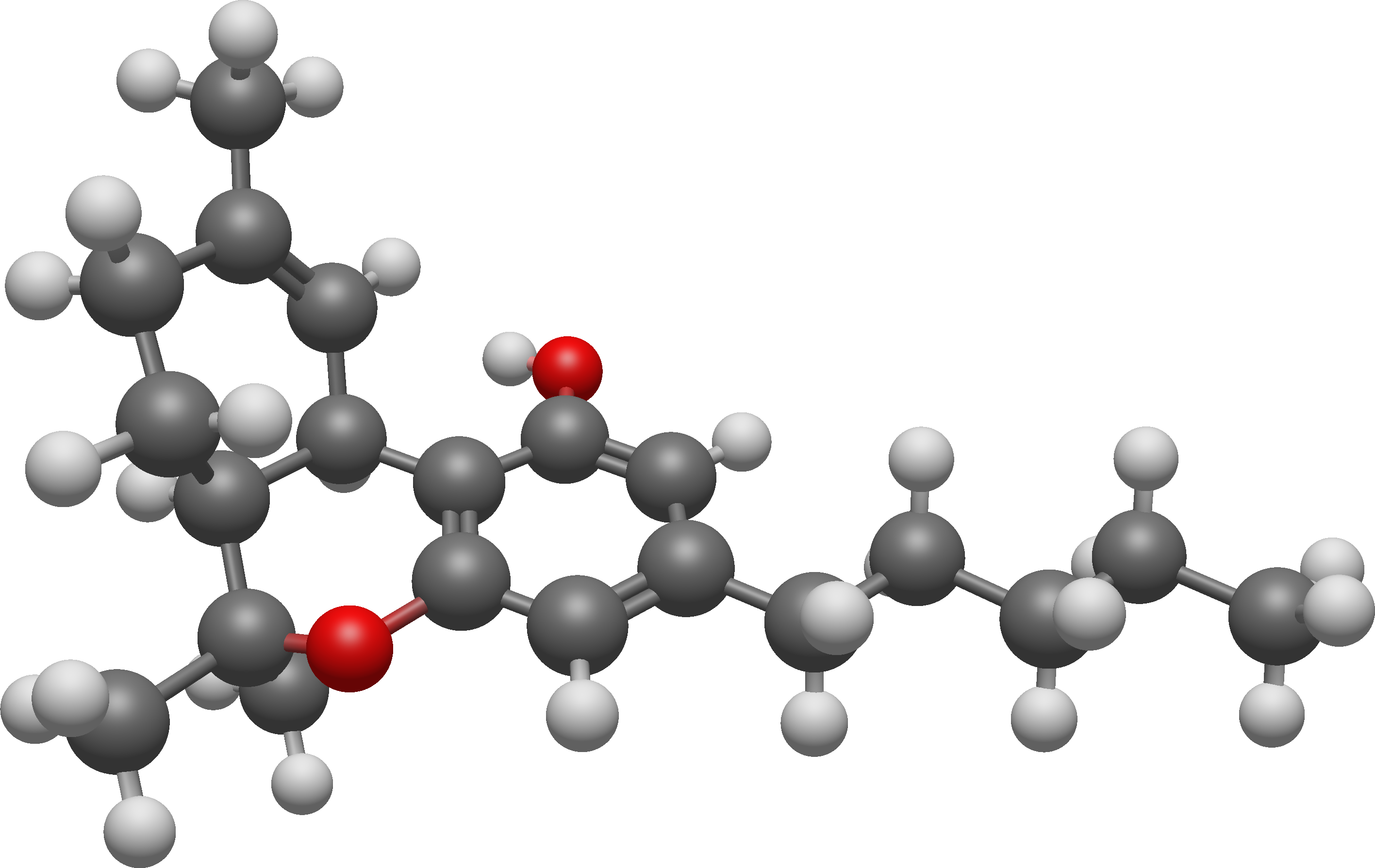

Identifiers
- IUPAC name: (6aS,10aR)-6,6,9-Trimethyl-3-pentyl-6a,7,8,10a-tetrahydrobenzo[c]chromen-1-ol
- CAS Number: 6087-73-6 43009-38-7
- PubChem CID: 12831993
- ChemSpider: 52083428
- UNII: 7JN0PAV0CJ

Chemical and physical data
- Formula: C_{21}H_{30}O_{2}
- Molar mass: 314.469 g·mol^{−1}
- 3D model (JSmol): Interactive image
- SMILES: CCCCCC1=CC(=C2[C@@H]3C=C(CC[C@@H]3C(OC2=C1)(C)C)C)O
- InChI: InChI=1S/C21H30O2/c1-5-6-7-8-15-12-18(22)20-16-11-14(2)9-10-17(16)21(3,4)23-19(20)13-15/h11-13,16-17,22H,5-10H2,1-4H3/t16-,17+/m1/s1; Key:CYQFCXCEBYINGO-SJORKVTESA-N

cis-THC (also known as cis-delta-9-tetrahydrocannabinol and (-)-cis-Δ^{9}-THC) is an isomer of tetrahydrocannabinol (THC) found in the Cannabis plant but in lower quantities than the more well-known trans isomer. Formation of cis-THC could take place in process of epimerization associated with acid-catalyzed cyclization of CBD to THC. It has similar psychoactive effects to trans-Δ^{9}-THC in tests on mice, but with only around 1/5th the potency. The equivalent Δ^{8} isomer is also known as a synthetic compound, but has not been isolated from Cannabis plant material. All four cis/trans isomers are known, though only the (6aR,10aR) and (6aS,10aR) enantiomers are psychoactive, while the others retain activity at targets such as GPR18 and GPR55.

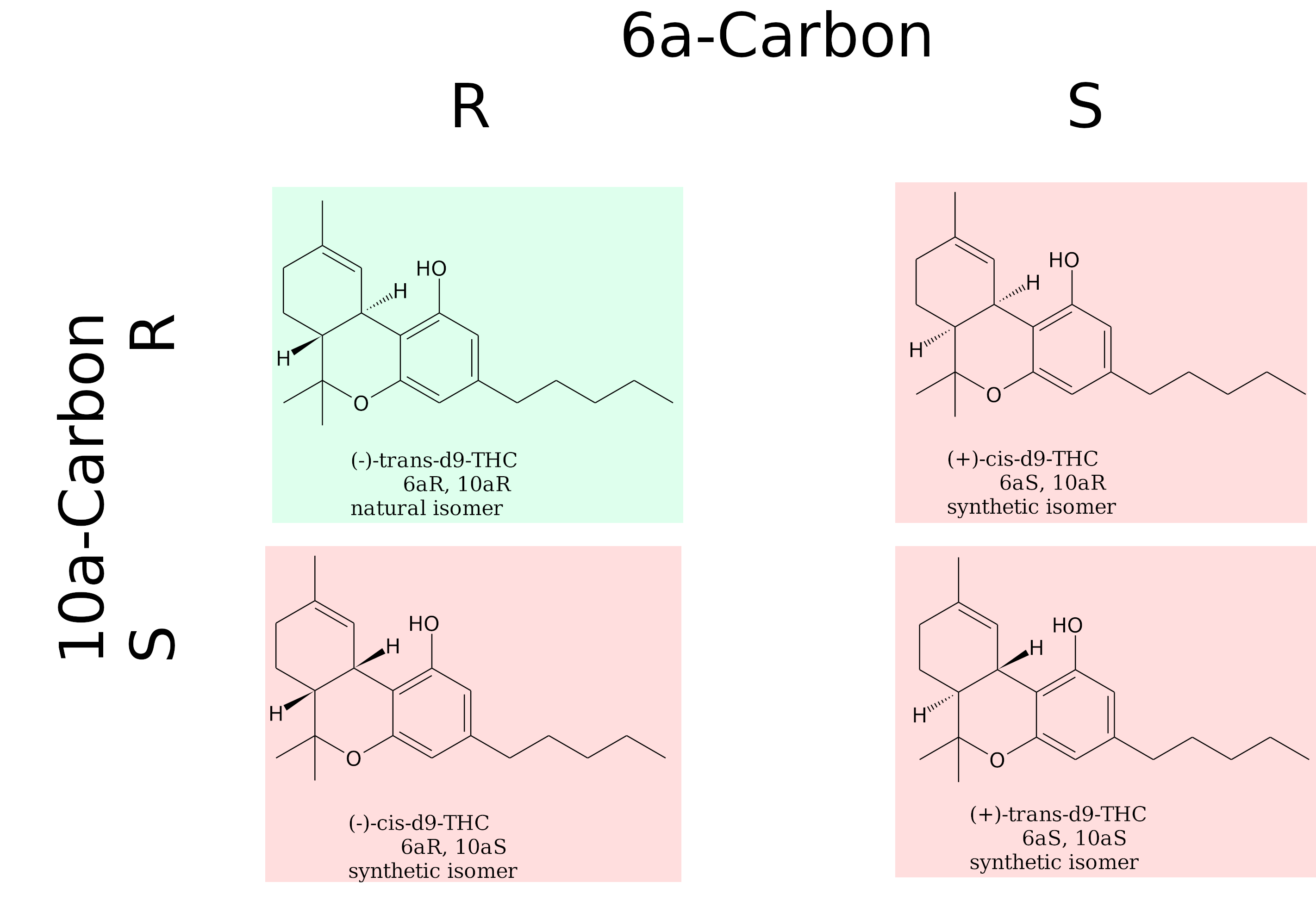
A diagram showing the isomers of delta-9-THC with carbon number indicated according to dibenzopyran numbering scheme. Cahn-Ingold-Prelog R/S designation is indicated. Please note that "synthetic" here refers to macroscopic quantities, and that these stereoisomers that are labeled as synthetic may be present in C. sativa or other organisms at trace levels compared to trans-(-)-d9-THC

== See also ==
- Abeo-HHC acetate
- Abn-CBD
- CBD-DMH
- Exo-THC
- Iso-THC
- HU-211
- Perrottetinene
- Machaeriol A
