= Dactyloradula =

Scientific classification
- Kingdom: Plantae
- Division: Marchantiophyta
- Class: Jungermanniopsida
- Order: Radulales
- Family: Radulaceae
- Genus: Dactyloradula (Devos, M.A.M.Renner, Gradst., A.J.Shaw & Vanderp.) M.A.M.Renner & Gradst.
- Species: D. brunnea

Binomial name
- Dactyloradula brunnea (Steph.) M.A.M.Renner & Gradst.

Synonyms
- Radula subgen. Dactyloradula Devos, M.A.M.Renner, Gradst., A.J.Shaw & Vanderp.; Radula brunnea Steph.; Radula abnormis Steph.; Stephanina brunnea (Steph.) Yasuda

Genus of liverworts

Dactyloradula is a liverwort genus in the family Radulaceae, containing the single species Dactyloradula brunnea. The species is endemic to Japan, though a disjunct population was historically known from Oregon in the western United States. The species typically grows as an epiphyte on tree bark in temperate forests, particularly in subalpine regions, and occasionally on rock faces. First described in 1910 as a species of Radula, it was elevated to genus status in 2022 based on its distinctive morphological features and ancient evolutionary history. The genus is characterised by its bistratose stem cortex, finger-like appendages at the base of its leaf lobules, and regular production of specialised branches called amentulose (reduced-leaf) shoots. Molecular studies indicate that Dactyloradula represents one of the earliest diverging lineages within Radulaceae, having separated from other members of the family about 133 million years ago during the Early Cretaceous period.

== Taxonomy ==
Dactyloradula brunnea was first described by Franz Stephani in 1910 under the name Radula brunnea. Stephani characterised it as a large, robust, reddish-brown plant with stems up to 6 cm long bearing specialised branches. He noted its distinctive features including crowded leaves with transversely inserted lobules, and recorded the plant from subtropical Japan.

Initially grouped within the large genus Radula, which then included all members of the family Radulaceae, Dactyloradula brunnea retained this classification for over a century. Its distinctive traits, however, set it apart from other species within the genus. Determining evolutionary relationships in the family has historically been challenging, as many unrelated species can have convergent lobule shapes. This morphological convergence poses particular challenges when trying to relate fossil specimens to modern lineages, especially when the fossils lack reproductive structures.

In 2011, a molecular phylogenetics study identified R. brunnea as a distinct evolutionary lineage that had diverged from other Radula species earlier than previously understood. This finding prompted its reclassification as a separate subgenus, Radula subg. Dactyloradula. Subsequent research into liverwort lineages led Matthew Renner and Robbert Gradstein to designate Dactyloradula as a genus in 2022, supported by multiple lines of evidence. Molecular clock analyses indicated that Dactyloradula diverged from other Radula species during the Mesozoic era, positioning it as an ancient genus-level lineage. The estimated age of divergence placed it as old as many flowering plant families, unusual for what was previously considered just one species within a larger genus.

The first known record of the species in what is now Russia came from Moneron (Kaibato) Island in the southwestern vicinity of Sakhalin Island, reported by Mitsuyoshi Kamimura in 1939. This location, like Shikotan Island where the species is currently known, is characterised by a lack of active volcanism since the Miocene and possible effects of insularity. Both populations are considered probable relicts of warmer epochs.

The elevation to genus status was also supported by Dactyloradula's distinctive morphological features, including its unique stem structure and specialised leaf modifications. These characteristics, combined with its ancient divergence, suggested it had been evolving independently from other Radula species for a very long time. The recognition of Dactyloradula as a separate genus brought the total number of genera in the family Radulaceae to three, alongside Radula and Cladoradula.

Dactyloradula represents one of the earliest diverging lineages within the family Radulaceae. Molecular phylogenetic studies indicate it forms a sister relationship with the core Radula clade (which includes most species traditionally placed in Radula), having diverged from this group during the Mesozoic era. Specifically, studies estimate the divergence occurred approximately 133 million years ago, during the Early Cretaceous period.

Within the family Radulaceae, Dactyloradula shares some ancestral characteristics with Cladoradula, particularly the transverse insertion of leaf lobules (specialised leaf structures). This feature is also shared with the genus Porella, which recent molecular studies of chloroplast genes suggest may be the sister group to the entire Radulaceae. The transverse lobule insertion has evolved independently multiple times in different lineages, suggesting this trait can arise through convergent evolution rather than only being inherited from a common ancestor. This feature differs from the longitudinal lobule insertion found in core Radula species, suggesting it represents an ancestral condition within the family. These shared characteristics with Cladoradula reflect their early-diverging positions in the family tree, though each genus followed its own unique evolutionary path. The transverse lobule insertion in Dactyloradula likely represents an ancestral trait within the family, evident in Cretaceous fossil species such as Radula heinrichsii. However, Dactyloradula is distinguishable from these fossils by specialised traits, including its distinctive finger-like appendages and unique amentulose branch structures.

== Diagnostic features ==
Dactyloradula is distinguished from related genera by several unique morphological characteristics. The most distinctive feature is its stem structure, which has a bistratose cortex (an outer protective layer made up of two cell layers). The inner layer of the cortex contains slightly larger cells than the outer layer, and both layers exhibit strong brown pigmentation in their cell walls. This stem structure differs from that found in Radula and Cladoradula.

Another key characteristic is the arrangement and structure of the lobules, which are specialised leaf structures found in these liverworts. In Dactyloradula, these lobules are attached to the stem at an oblique to transverse angle, and uniquely possess one to three finger-like appendages at their base. These appendages are not found in any other genus within the family Radulaceae.

The genus is also characterised by its production of amentulose shoots (small, specialised branches with reduced leaves) from the base of most leaves. While some species of Radula can produce similar structures, the consistent presence and positioning of these shoots in Dactyloradula helps distinguish it from related genera.

These features, when considered together, provide a reliable way to identify Dactyloradula and support its recognition as a distinct genus. The combination of bistratose cortex, finger-like lobule appendages, and regular production of amentulose shoots is unique within the Radulaceae.

== Description ==
Dactyloradula is a small liverwort forming flat mats of overlapping stems and leaves. Similar to other Radulaceae, it lacks the leaf-like underleaves (amphigastria) found in many other liverwort groups, and instead produces root-like rhizoids from specialised zones on its leaves rather than from its stem.

The genus is distinguished by growth and cellular structure. Its stems have a two-layered protective outer cortex, with slightly larger inner-layer cells compared to the outer layer. Both layers have brown-pigmented cell walls, resulting in the stems' dark appearance. The genus's finger-like lobule appendages develop through extended cell division at their base, near the stem insertion. Lobule development and structure serve as key taxonomic features, with differences in shape and size aiding species identification.

The leaves are arranged in two rows along the stem and are divided into two distinct parts: a larger upper lobe and a smaller lower lobe (lobule). A notable feature is the presence of one to three finger-like projections at the base of each lobule, a characteristic not found in any other genus of the family. The point where the lobule attaches to the stem (the insertion line) runs at an oblique to transverse angle, rather than parallel to the stem as seen in many related plants.

One of the most distinctive features of Dactyloradula is its regular production of specialised branches called amentulose shoots. These small, modified branches emerge from the base of most leaves, creating a characteristic branching pattern. The plant also produces standard branches for growth and reproduction, following the typical Radula-type branching pattern common to the family.

Reproductive structures, when present, include both male and female organs on the same plant (monoicous). The female reproductive structures (gynoecia) are accompanied by protective outgrowths called innovations, which help shield the developing reproductive organs.

== Habitat and distribution ==
Dactyloradula is endemic to Japan, with a historical record of its presence in North America. In 1978, the species was observed growing abundantly on basalt cliffs facing north at 975 m (3,200 ft) on Saddle Mountain, northwestern Oregon. This remains its only documented occurrence outside Japan.

Within its natural habitat, Dactyloradula is a neutrophilic meso-hygrophyte found at elevations of (160–300 m a.s.l.) in a Krummholz belt, characterised by dense thickets of Juniperus sargentii thickets and tall herbaceous plants shaped by strong winds. The genus is commonly found in temperate forests, where it typically grows as an epiphyte on tree bark. In Japan, Dactyloradula primarily inhabits subalpine regions, where it growsg both on tree bark and, less frequently, on rocks. The Oregon population, by contrast, was restricted to cliffs, forming large, dark brown to nearly black patches. On Shikotan Island, Dactyloradula is locally abundant and often found alongside species such as East Asian Douinia plicata, Frullania appendiculata, and Herbertus dicranus, arctic-alpine Anthelia juratzkana, and montane Diplophyllum albicans. It thrives in open, moist cliff crevices, frequently enveloped by fog, either forming pure mats or coexisting with these associates. This habitat preference aligns with that of other Radulaceae members, most of which are also predominantly epiphytic.

Unlike many related liverworts with widespread distributions, Dactyloradula has a particularly restricted range. This contrasts with its relatives, such as Radula, which is nearly global, and Cladoradula, found in various tropical and temperate regions.
