= Radula marginata =

Conservation status
- Declining (NZ TCS)

Scientific classification
- Kingdom: Plantae
- Division: Marchantiophyta
- Class: Jungermanniopsida
- Order: Radulales
- Family: Radulaceae
- Genus: Radula
- Species: R. marginata

Binomial name
- Radula marginata (Hook.f. & Taylor) Gottsche, Lindenb. & Nees

Species of liverwort

Radula marginata, or wairuakohu, is a species of plant in the genus Radula, a genus of liverworts. It is endemic to New Zealand. It has been found to contain cannabinoids.

== Cannabinoids ==
The main cannabinoids in Radula marginata are not THC or CBD, the most common psychoactive chemicals produced by cannabis, but they are of similar molecular structure. The liverwort contains perrottetinene and perrottetinenic acid. It also contains a CBD analogue called Perrottetinene diol (trans-PTD). The proportion of cannabinoids present is much less than in cannabis. Perrottetinene has been shown to be a moderately potent CB_{1} agonist leading to mild psychoactive effects in mice.

== Kaitiakitanga ==
Research on this taonga species has been carried out since 2017 by a multi-disciplinary international collaboration including a number of companies, research institutions and a collective of Māori communities represented by iwi organisations that have the plant growing in their tribal area, with a focus on exploring potential therapeutics derived from the cannabinoids.

A Charitable Trust was established by the three foundation iwi in 2024 to represent the interests of the plant and the ecosystems that support it. A website provides information on the project to tribal members, other iwi and anyone interested in the rights and responsibilities of Indigenous Peoples associated with the research and development activities.

== Conservation status ==
In 2020 the official status of Radula marginata was changed by the Department of Conservation (New Zealand) to "At Risk – Declining" based on an observed decline of populations. The report said "Illegal collecting is causing local declines of R. marginata and loss of some populations."

Dr Richard Espley from Plant & Food Research discussed some of the conservation concerns during an interview with Anna Thomas on Radio New Zealand in January 2025.
