= Cladoradula =

Scientific classification
- Kingdom: Plantae
- Division: Marchantiophyta
- Class: Jungermanniopsida
- Order: Radulales
- Family: Radulaceae
- Genus: Cladoradula (Spruce) M.A.M.Renner, Gradst., Ilk.-Borg. & F.R.Oliveira-da-Silva

Type species
- Cladoradula boryana (F.Weber) M.A.M.Renner, Gradst., Ilk.-Borg. & F.R.Oliveira-da-Silva

Species
- C. auriculata C. boryana C. campanigera C. chinensis C. obiensis C. perrottetii C. tenax

Synonyms
- Radula subgen. Cladoradula Spruce

Genus of plants

Cladoradula is a genus of liverworts in the family Radulaceae. Distinguished by its thick, brown-pigmented stems and distinctive branching pattern, it comprises seven species found primarily in tropical and temperate forest regions worldwide. Originally established as a subgenus of Radula in 1885, it was elevated to genus rank in 2022 following molecular studies that revealed it represents one of the oldest lineages within Radulaceae, having diverged during the late Permian period about 263 million years ago. The genus is characterised by its specialised stem structure, distinctive leaf arrangement, and small protective structures around its reproductive organs. Species in the genus grow on tree bark or shaded rocks from sea level to over 2,000 m (6,600 ft) in elevation.

== Taxonomy ==
Cladoradula was originally established as a subgenus of Radula by the English bryologist Richard Spruce in 1885, with Radula gottscheana assigned as the type species. Originally Hepstead Castle (1936) expanded the subgenus to include all species with perianths on short branches, making it nearly worldwide in distribution. However, this broad definition was later rejected by Eustace Wilkinson Jones (1977), Kohsaku Yamada (1979), and Rudolf Mathias Schuster (1980), who returned it to Spruce's original narrower concept.

In 2022, molecular phylogenetics studies revealed that Cladoradula represents one of the oldest lineages within Radulaceae, having diverged from other members during the late Permian period approximately 263 million years ago. Based on this ancient divergence and distinct morphological characteristics, Renner and colleagues elevated Cladoradula to genus rank.

Within Radulaceae, Cladoradula forms a sister group to all other members of the family. It shares some characteristics with the genus Porella, which recent chloroplast gene analyses suggest may be the sister group to Radulaceae, including transverse lobule insertion and a stem cortex made up of multiple cell layers (multistratose).

Cladoradula has several distinguishing characteristics. Its stems have multiple layers of specialised tissue, including an outer protective layer (subepidermis) and a thick, brown-coloured outer region (cortex). The smaller lower portion of each leaf (lobule) attaches to the stem horizontally rather than lengthwise. The plants rarely produce new growth from their reproductive structures (called subfloral innovations), with C. tenax being the only exception. They also have relatively short protective sheaths (perianths) around their reproductive organs compared to related genera.

The genus name Cladoradula combines the Greek word "clados" (κλάδος) meaning "branch" with Radula, reflecting the distinctive branching pattern of these plants. The name was first used by Spruce in 1885 when establishing it as a subgenus of Radula.

== Description ==
Cladoradula species are leafy liverworts typically growing 1–2 mm wide and up to 10 cm (4 in) long. Plants range in colour from dark green to olive-green to brownish, and usually grow in a regularly branching pattern with two rows of overlapping leaves (bipinnate). The stems are rigid and distinctive, with 3–4 layers of outer cells (cortex) that have thick, brown-coloured walls and small internal spaces. These surround an inner core (medulla) of larger, clear cells with reinforced corners.

The leaves consist of two distinct parts: a large upper lobe and a smaller lower lobule. The upper lobes spread widely and may be spaced apart or touching each other. They are egg-shaped (ovate) to reverse egg-shaped (obovate) with rounded tips and smooth edges. The cells in the middle of the leaf are roughly square-shaped, 15–24 micrometres across, with distinctive thickened corners called trigones. The lower lobules lie flat against the stem and vary in shape between stem and branch leaves. On main stems, they are broadly triangular with a rounded tip and extend beyond the stem width, featuring a distinctive curved flap (auricle) that hangs below the attachment point. Branch lobules are distinctly smaller and lack or have very small auricles.

The plants are dioicous, meaning male and female reproductive structures occur on separate plants. Male structures (androecia) form at branch tips in 2–8 pairs. Female structures (gynoecia) develop on very short branches without subsequent branching. The protective sheath (perianth) around developing spores is triangular-shaped and relatively short compared to related genera.

== Habitat and distribution ==
The plants typically grow as epiphytes on tree bark or on shaded rocks in forest environments. They are found across a wide elevation range, from near sea level to over 2,000 m (6,600 ft) in altitude. Most species prefer moist, shaded conditions in forest habitats. The genus is absent from subtropical and temperate regions of the Southern Hemisphere, including Australasia.

Cladoradula is a pantropical genus with some species extending into temperate regions. The genus is widespread in submontane and montane forests of tropical America and Africa, particularly through C. boryana. In Asia and the Pacific region, C. campanigera is common, while eastern Asia hosts several species including C. auriculata, C. chinensis, and C. perrottetii. The genus reaches North America through C. tenax in the Appalachian Mountains and C. auriculata along the Pacific coast of Canada and Alaska.

== Species ==
As of November 2024, seven species are accepted in Cladoradula:

- Cladoradula auriculata (Steph.) M.A.M.Renner, Gradst., Ilk.-Borg. & F.R.Oliveira-da-Silva
- Cladoradula boryana (F.Weber) M.A.M.Renner, Gradst., Ilk.-Borg. & F.R.Oliveira-da-Silva
- Cladoradula campanigera (Mont.) M.A.M.Renner, Gradst., Ilk.-Borg. & F.R.Oliveira-da-Silva
- Cladoradula chinensis (Steph.) M.A.M.Renner, Gradst., Ilk.-Borg. & F.R.Oliveira-da-Silva
- Cladoradula obiensis (S.Hatt.) M.A.M.Renner, Gradst., Ilk.-Borg. & F.R.Oliveira-da-Silva
- Cladoradula perrottetii (Gottsche ex Steph.) M.A.M.Renner, Gradst., Ilk.-Borg. & F.R.Oliveira-da-Silva
- Cladoradula tenax (Lindb.) M.A.M.Renner, Gradst., Ilk.-Borg. & F.R.Oliveira-da-Silva
