= Machaeriol A =

Chemical compound

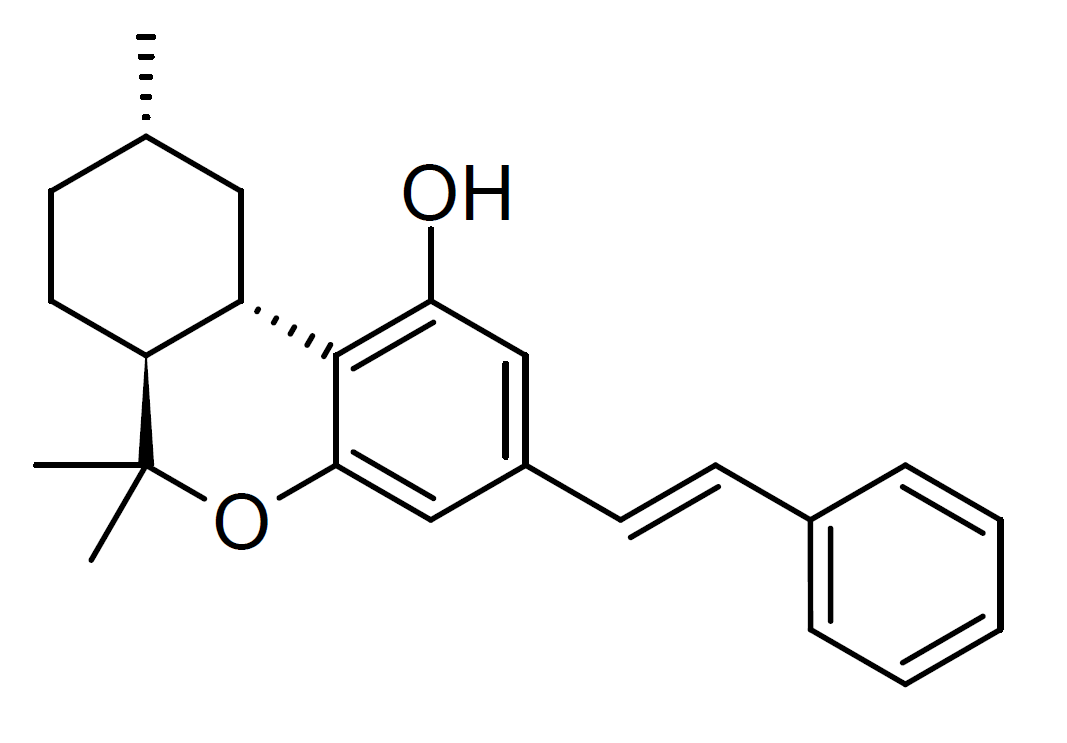

Identifiers
- IUPAC name: (6aS,9S,10aS)-6,6,9-trimethyl-3-[(E)-2-phenylethenyl]-6a,7,8,9,10,10a-hexahydrobenzo[c]chromen-1-ol
- CAS Number: 377077-52-6
- PubChem CID: 10089121
- ChemSpider: 8264658
- ChEMBL: ChEMBL494422

Chemical and physical data
- Formula: C_{24}H_{28}O_{2}
- Molar mass: 348.486 g·mol^{−1}
- 3D model (JSmol): Interactive image
- SMILES: C[C@H]1CC[C@H]2[C@H](C1)C3=C(C=C(C=C3OC2(C)C)/C=C/C4=CC=CC=C4)O
- InChI: InChI=1S/C24H28O2/c1-16-9-12-20-19(13-16)23-21(25)14-18(15-22(23)26-24(20,2)3)11-10-17-7-5-4-6-8-17/h4-8,10-11,14-16,19-20,25H,9,12-13H2,1-3H3/b11-10+/t16-,19-,20-/m0/s1; Key:KCNFZTIIENBEPU-TUCATBTLSA-N

Machaeriol A is one of a number of phytocannabinoids with a hexahydrocannabinol backbone, found in plants from the Machaerium family such as Machaerium multiflorum. While they are related in structure to tetrahydrocannabinol from cannabis, the machaeriol compounds have opposite trans stereochemistry from THC and have no affinity for the psychoactive CB_{1} receptor. However, some derivatives are active at CB_{2} and if synthesized as their (-)-trans isomers they would retain CB1/CB2 activity, and they have also been found to have antibacterial, antifungal and antiparasitic actions, and have been investigated as lead compounds for the development of potential anti-cancer drugs.

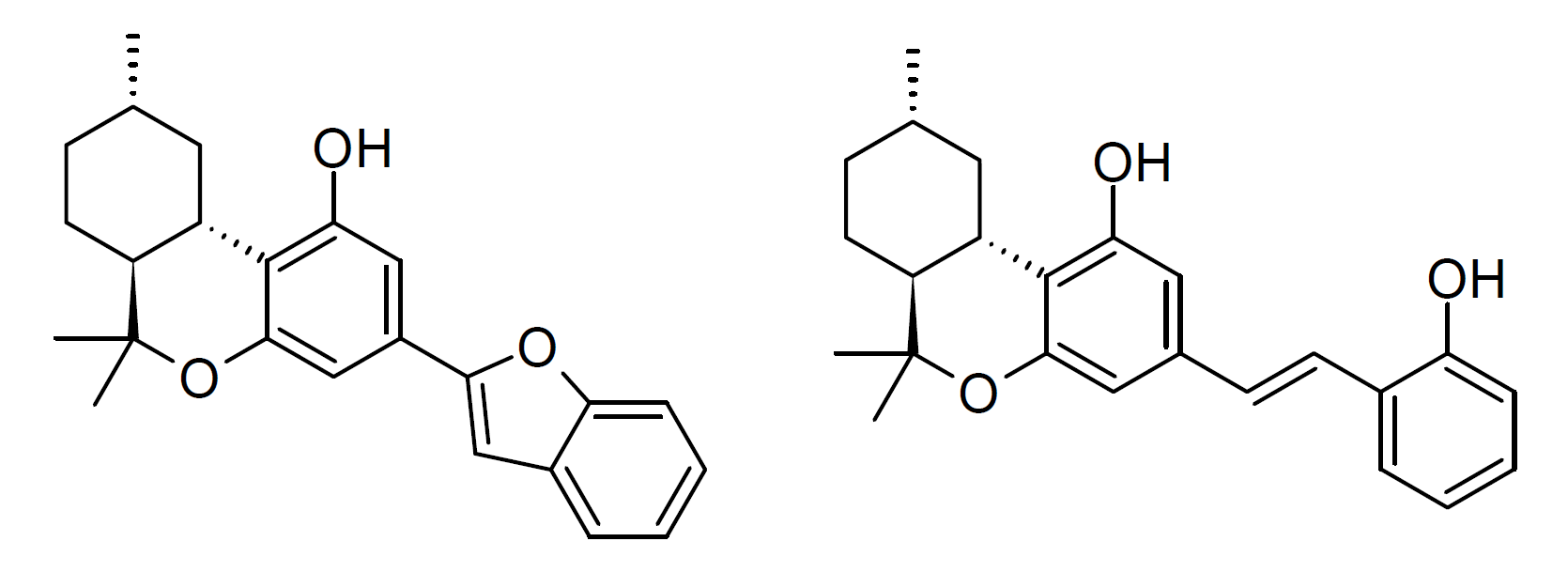
Machaeriol B, 377077-53-7 and Machaeriol C, 565429-89-2

== See also ==
- Perrottetinene
- Cis-THC
