= Perrottetinene =

Chemical compound

Clinical data
- ATC code: none

Legal status
- Legal status: BR: List F2; CA: Schedule II

Identifiers
- IUPAC name: (6aS,10aR)- 6,6,9-trimethyl- 3-(2-phenylethyl)- 6a,7,8,10a-tetrahydrobenzo[c]chromen- 1-ol
- CAS Number: 160041-34-9
- PubChem CID: 24766094
- ChemSpider: 28284856
- UNII: HZ8N3GKD3U
- CompTox Dashboard (EPA): DTXSID401028205

Chemical and physical data
- Formula: C_{24}H_{28}O_{2}
- Molar mass: 348.486 g·mol^{−1}
- 3D model (JSmol): Interactive image
- SMILES: CC1=C[C@H]2c3c(cc(cc3OC([C@H]2CC1)(C)C)CCc4ccccc4)O
- InChI: InChI=1S/C24H28O2/c1-16-9-12-20-19(13-16)23-21(25)14-18(15-22(23)26-24(20,2)3)11-10-17-7-5-4-6-8-17/h4-8,13-15,19-20,25H,9-12H2,1-3H3/t19-,20+/m1/s1; Key:DYHMKBLKWFFFSZ-UXHICEINSA-N

Perrottetinene is a naturally occurring cannabinoid compound found in liverworts from the family Radulaceae native to Japan, New Zealand and Costa Rica, namely Cladoradula perrottetii, Radula marginata and Radula laxiramea, along with a number of similar compounds. Its chemical structure closely resembles that of THC, the main active component of marijuana but with a cis rather than trans conformation and a bibenzyl tailchain instead of pentyl. The absolute configuration of perrottetinene was established in 2008 by an enantioselective total synthesis.

== Pharmacology ==
In 2018, a study showed that perrottetinene is mild to moderately psychoactive through activation of the cannabinoid receptor 1. (-)-cis-Perrottetinene was found to have a binding affinity of 481 nM at CB1 and 225 nM at CB2, while the unnatural (-)-trans-perrottetinene was found to more active with binding affinities of 127 nM at CB1 and 126 nM at CB2, both acting as partial agonists. In terms of binding affinity, this study found cis-perrottetinene to be over 22 times weaker than delta-9-THC. The same study also reported significantly reduced prostaglandin D2 and E2 brain concentrations in mice after perrottetinene administration.

Perrottetinene is structurally related to machaeriol A and other machaeriols found in Machaerium species.

== See also ==
- Cis-THC
- CP 42,096
- KM-233
- AM-411
