= Radula jonesii =

Conservation status
- Endangered (IUCN 3.1)

Scientific classification
- Kingdom: Plantae
- Division: Marchantiophyta
- Class: Jungermanniopsida
- Order: Radulales
- Family: Radulaceae
- Genus: Radula
- Species: R. jonesii

Binomial name
- Radula jonesii Bouman, Dirkse & Yamada

Species of liverwort

Radula jonesii is a species of liverwort in the family Radulaceae, first described in 1988 from specimens collected in the Anaga Mountains of Tenerife. Endemic to Macaronesia, this dark to olive-green liverwort is known from five locations on Madeira Island and one location on Tenerife, where it grows as both an epiphyte on trees such as Laurus novocanariensis and as a lithophyte on shaded rocks in old growth laurel forest ecosystems between 800–1,000 m (2,600–3,300 ft) altitude. The species is distinguished by its procumbent growth habit, pinnately branched stems measuring 10–15 mm (0.4–0.6 in) in length, and distinctive cellular features including uniformly thin-walled leaf cells. Classified as Endangered due to its restricted range and small population size, R. jonesii faces threats from climate change, habitat degradation, and tourism pressure, though its habitat receives protection through various conservation designations including UNESCO World Heritage status.

== Taxonomy ==
Radula jonesii was formally described in 1988 in the Journal of Bryology by Adrianus Cornelis Bouman, Gerardus Martinus Dirkse, and Kohsaku Yamada. The specific epithet jonesii honors Eustace Wilkinson Jones, who made significant contributions to the study of African liverworts. The holotype specimen (RIN 003367) was collected from the Anaga Mountains of Tenerife at an elevation of 750 m (2,460 ft) and is preserved at the Utrecht University Herbarium (U), with an isotype stored at the Hattori Botanical Laboratory (NICH) in Japan.

When first discovered between 1984 and 1987, the species was initially mistaken for Radula holtii. However, detailed examination revealed it to be distinct from any known European, African, North American, or South American species of Radula.

Radula jonesii belongs to a clade of species closely related to the R. complanata/R. lindenbergiana complex, which is widely distributed in the northern hemisphere. This relationship has been confirmed through molecular analysis of plastid DNA sequences. It is one of two endemic Radula species in Macaronesia, along with R. wichurae.

== Description ==
Radula jonesii is a medium-sized liverwort that forms loose, slightly procumbent (lying along the ground) mats. The plants appear dark to olive-green in color, with main stems measuring 10–15 mm (0.4–0.6 in) in length. These stems branch irregularly in a pinnate pattern, similar to the arrangement of a feather. The species possesses several unique characteristics in its cellular structure, most notably in its stem anatomy where the outer (epidermal) cells closely resemble the inner (medullary) cells, both featuring thick walls and triangular thickenings called trigones. The leaf-like structures, known as lobes, are narrowly ovate (egg-shaped) to ovate in shape, with distinctive curved bases that never extend across the stem. Within these lobes, the cells display uniformly thin walls without trigones, a feature that helps distinguish this species from its relatives.

The reproductive structure, called a perianth, is cylindrical with an irregularly lobed opening at its tip. R. jonesii is paroecious, meaning male and female reproductive organs are found on the same branch but in different locations. When reproducing, the species produces green spores measuring 18–22 μm in diameter. Researchers have not observed any methods of vegetative reproduction (reproduction without spores) in this species, suggesting it relies entirely on spore production for propagation.

== Distribution and habitat ==
Radula jonesii is known from five highly fragmented locations on Madeira Island between 800–1,000 m (2,600–3,300 ft) above sea level and one location on Tenerife around 800 m (2,600 ft) above sea level. It is found only in ravines and on north-facing slopes in old growth laurel forests. On Madeira Island it grows primarily on trees, while on Tenerife it grows only on wet, shaded rocks.

== Ecology ==
Radula jonesii has been observed growing as an epiphyte and as a lithophyte. On Madeira Island, host tree species include Laurus novocanariensis, Ocotea foetens and Clethra arborea. Other vascular plants occurring in the same habitat as R. jonesii include Dryopteris intermedia subsp. maderensis, Heberdenia excelsa, Picconia excelsa, Tolpis macrorhiza, and Vaccinium padifolium. It is commonly found growing in association with other bryophytes, including the liverworts Drepanolejeunea hamatifolia, Frullania microphylla, Frullania polysticta, Frullania teneriffae, Harpalejeunea ovata, Isothecium prolixum, Lejeunea eckloniana, Marsupella emarginata, Microlejeunea ulicina, Neckera intermedia, Plagiochila exigua, Porella canariensis, Radula carringtonii, Radula lindenbergiana, and Radula wichurae, and the mosses Hypnum cupressiforme and Trichostomum brachydontium.

== Conservation ==
Radula jonesii faces several conservation challenges across its limited range in Madeira and the Canary Islands. The species is currently classified as Endangered, with population estimates indicating fewer than 2,500 mature specimens across its entire distribution. Each subpopulation contains fewer than 250 specimens, with the species being particularly vulnerable in Tenerife, where it is known from only a single location.

The primary threats to R. jonesii stem from climate change, which has led to increasing instances of extreme temperatures and drought conditions, particularly affecting the Tenerife population. The species has also suffered habitat loss due to severe storms over the past decade. Additional pressures include the expansion of ecotourism, which can disrupt the delicate microhabitat conditions required by this sensitive liverwort. The spread of invasive plant species and an increased frequency of forest fires pose further risks to its survival.

Several protective measures are currently in place. The species' habitat in Tenerife falls within the Rural Park of Anaga and is designated as a Special Area of Conservation (SAC). In Madeira, most populations are located within the Madeira Natural Park, which holds multiple protected statuses including designation as a Natura 2000 site and UNESCO World Natural Heritage site. The laurel forest habitat itself is recognized as a priority habitat under the EU Habitats Directive.

Conservation experts recommend implementing specific protective measures beyond these general habitat protections. These recommendations include regular monitoring programs, particularly for the vulnerable Tenerife population, and the preservation of specimens in botanical gardens or other facilities outside their natural habitat. Enhanced habitat management and protection strategies, along with careful regulation of tourism activities in sensitive areas, are also considered crucial. The species has been assessed as Critically Endangered in the Canary Islands and Endangered in both Madeira and Europe more broadly.
