= Radula visianica =

Conservation status
- Critically Endangered (IUCN 3.1)

Scientific classification
- Kingdom: Plantae
- Division: Marchantiophyta
- Class: Jungermanniopsida
- Order: Radulales
- Family: Radulaceae
- Genus: Radula
- Species: R. visianica

Binomial name
- Radula visianica C.Massal.

Species of liverwort

Radula visianica is a species of liverwort in the family Radulaceae. It is endemic to the European Alps. It was thought to be extinct since 1938 but was rediscovered in 2014 in Austria.

== Taxonomy ==
Radula visianica was first described by the Italian botanist Caro Massalongo in 1904, based on specimens he had collected in February 1878. The species name honours Roberto de Visiani, a 19th-century botanist who owned a villa near the original collection site in the Euganean Hills of northeastern Italy. The species belongs to the genus Radula in the family Radulaceae, within the order Porellales of the liverworts (Marchantiophyta). The type specimen (holotype) was collected "at Mt. Sengiari above Torreglia, not far from the place where the villa that once belonged to the late professor R. de Visiani was located." The holotype is housed in the herbarium of Verona (VER), with additional type material (isotypes) preserved in the Farlow Herbarium at Harvard University (FH) and the Swedish Museum of Natural History in Stockholm (S).

Initially, researchers believed R. visianica might have tropical affinities due to some of its morphological features. However, its rediscovery in alpine environments and subsequent study suggests it is actually a cold-adapted species that evolved in Europe.

== Description ==
Radula visianica is a small, green to yellowish-green plant that grows in patches. Individual shoots are typically 0.3–1.5 mm (0.012–0.059 in) wide and can reach up to 20 mm (0.79 in) in length. The plant has two distinct parts to each leaf: a larger upper lobe (dorsal lobe) and a smaller lower lobe (ventral lobe), which is a characteristic feature of the genus Radula.

The species is notable for its highly variable appearance depending on its growing conditions. In exposed, cold locations, it develops compact forms with inflated lower lobes, while in protected, moist locations, it grows larger with flatter, more elongated lobes. This adaptability helps it survive in different environmental conditions.

== Habitat and distribution ==
While initially thought to be a tree-dwelling species, R. visianica primarily grows on north-facing dolomite rocks (a type of limestone rich in magnesium) in mountainous areas. It is typically found at elevations between 150–1,800 m (490–5,910 ft) above sea level, usually in moist to wet conditions. The species often grows among other small plants, including mosses and algae.

As of 2016, R. visianica was known from only seven locations, including two historical sites in Italy (including the original discovery site near Padua), and five more recently discovered sites in the Austrian Alps. Scientists believe the species may also exist in other mountainous regions of Europe with similar geological conditions, such as the Apennines, Dinarides, Carpathians, and Pyrenees, though it has not yet been found in these areas.

== Conservation ==
Radula visianica was listed as extinct on the IUCN Red List until its rediscovery in Austria. The species appears to be vulnerable to climate change and air pollution, particularly in lower elevation sites. Its apparent preference for dolomite rock in mountain environments may represent an adaptation that has helped it survive during periods of climate change. The species is categorised in the European Red List of bryophytes as critically endangered.
