= Arotinoid acid =

Identifiers
- IUPAC name: 4-[(E)-2-(5,5,8,8-tetramethyl-6,7-dihydronaphthalen-2-yl)prop-1-enyl]benzoic acid
- CAS Number: 71441-28-6
- PubChem CID: 5289501
- IUPHAR/BPS: 2646
- DrugBank: DB02877
- ChemSpider: 4451454
- UNII: 673M8C29UR
- KEGG: C15634
- ChEBI: CHEBI:75261
- ChEMBL: ChEMBL275311
- CompTox Dashboard (EPA): DTXSID6040743
- ECHA InfoCard: 100.150.879

Chemical and physical data
- Formula: C_{24}H_{28}O_{2}
- Molar mass: 348.486 g·mol^{−1}
- 3D model (JSmol): Interactive image
- SMILES: C/C(=C\C1=CC=C(C=C1)C(=O)O)/C2=CC3=C(C=C2)C(CCC3(C)C)(C)C
- InChI: InChI=1S/C24H28O2/c1-16(14-17-6-8-18(9-7-17)22(25)26)19-10-11-20-21(15-19)24(4,5)13-12-23(20,2)3/h6-11,14-15H,12-13H2,1-5H3,(H,25,26)/b16-14+; Key:FOIVPCKZDPCJJY-JQIJEIRASA-N

Arotinoid acid (TTNPB, Ro 13-7410) is an experimental drug which is a synthetic retinoid derivative. It was originally developed for potential medical applications in cancer treatment, but was not adopted due to potent teratogenic activity. However it has since been found to be useful as part of a cocktail of signalling factors used for cellular reprogramming in order to produce pluripotent stem cells.
