= Eustace Wilkinson Jones =

British bryologist (1909–1992)

- Born: 6 June 1909; Walsall
- Died: 21 August 1992 (aged 83); Oxford
- Education: University of Helsinki
- Scientific career
- Fields: Bryology
- Author abbrev. (botany): E.W.Jones

Eustace Wilkinson Jones (6 June 1909 – 21 August 1992) was a forester and bryologist whose expertise on African hepatics is widely recognized for its accuracy and attention to detail. His contributions to bryology were made in his leisure hours since he spent most of his career teaching and conducting research on forestry. It was only after he retired that he could devote himself entirely to bryology.

== Life and career ==
Born in Walsall in Staffordshire, Eustace showed an interest in field botany at a young age. Educated in Walsall, he entered Jesus College, Cambridge in 1928. There he earned a first-class honours degree in Natural Sciences Tripos, and then went on to pursue a Ph.D. on the ionic relationships of Cladophora, graduating with this degree in 1937. He joined the Forestry School at Oxford in 1934 as a teacher, where he remained until his retirement in 1972. His work on the structure and reproduction of the virgin forest of the North Temperate Zone and Nigerian forests are influential and of significant importance. Other interests of his were the genera Acer and Quercus, subjects he wrote about in the "Biological Flora of the British Isles" series in the Journal of Ecology. He established a long-term woodland monitoring study in the Lady Park Wood National Nature Reserve in the 1950s. Jones was an editor for the scientific journal Forestry from 1970 to 1978.

Jones' interest in bryophytes was piqued by his grandfather, who showed him the green reflection caused by Schistostega pennata. He developed a good understanding of British mosses and hepatics and collected and studied them during his work in forestry. Eustace's work on African bryophytes began in 1947–48 when he joined the second Cambridge University Expedition to Nigeria. Later on, he made several visits to West and East tropical Africa as part of his forestry work.

Jones' meticulous observations and extensive fieldwork led to numerous papers on British and African bryophytes. His "Bryophyte Flora of Berkshire and Oxfordshire" and "The changing bryophyte flora of Oxfordshire" are notable contributions. Eustace's passion for plant ecology and physiology informed his bryology work and forestry research. He was an excellent lecturer and tutor, and his study tours were popular with students. His publications are notable for their clear language and lack of jargon.

Jones retired from his post at Oxford in protest at the university's decision to discontinue undergraduate teaching in forestry. His legacy in bryology is cemented by his attention to detail and commitment to fieldwork, which led to significant contributions to the understanding of British and African bryophytes. The majority of his collections are now held at the Fielding-Druce Herbarium in Oxford.

== Recognition ==
Eustace Jones is commemorated by two mosses, Trichostelium jonesii Bizot ex Pocs and the genus Jonesiobryum Bizot & Pocs (family Funariaceae) and by two hepatics, Lopholejeunea jonesii Vanden Berghen and Radula jonesii Dirkse & Yamada.

== Selected publications ==
Jones' complete corpus of scientific publications is listed in his 1993 obituary by Paul Richards. Some of his works include:

- Jones, E. W. (1945). "The structure and reproduction of the virgin forest of the North Temperate Zone". New Phytol. 44 (2): 13–48. doi:10.1111/j.1469-8137.1945.tb05026.x.
- Jones, E. W. (1985). "Bryophytes of forest and savanna in northern Nigeria". Cryptogamie Bryol. Lichenol. 6: 259–277.
- Jones, E. W.; Harrington (1983). "The hepatics of Sierra Leone and Ghana". Bulletin of the British Museum (Natural History) Botany. 11 (3): 215–289.
