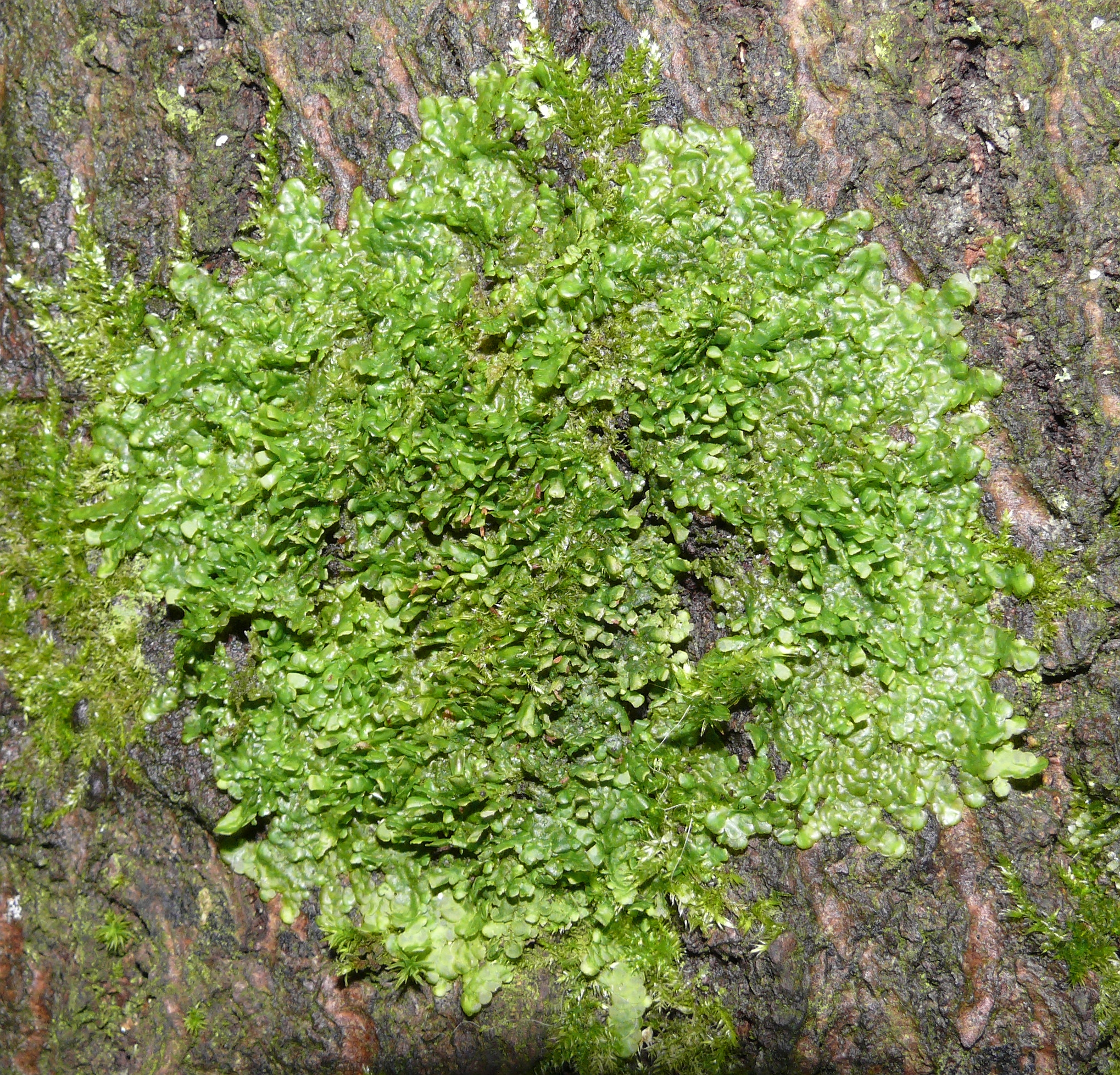
- Radula complanata

Scientific classification
- Kingdom: Plantae
- Division: Marchantiophyta
- Class: Jungermanniopsida
- Order: Radulales; Stotler & Crand.-Stotl.
- Family: Radulaceae; Müll.Frib.

Genera
- Cladoradula; Dactyloradula; Radula

Synonyms
- Stephaninaceae Mig.

= Radulaceae =

Family of plants

Radulaceae is a family of liverworts, and the only family in the order Radulales. The family comprises three genera: Radula, Cladoradula, and Dactyloradula, recognised as distinct following a 2022 taxonomic revision. Distinguishing features include bilobed leaves arranged in two rows, with the smaller lobe folded under the larger one, and rhizoids (root-like structures) uniquely emerging from leaves rather than stems. The family lacks underleaves, which are common in other liverwort families. Fossil evidence from Burmese amber indicates the family had diversified by the Cretaceous period, approximately 98 million years ago, with molecular studies suggesting its divergence from related groups occurred during the Permian period.

While Radula occurs worldwide from sea level to 4,000 metres elevation, Cladoradula shows a disjunct distribution across tropical and temperate regions, typically growing on tree bark and shaded rocks in submontane and lower montane forests between 400 and 2,100 metres. Dactyloradula is endemic to Japan and uniquely features finger-like appendages at the base of each leaf lobe. The family includes both rare and widespread species, with several Macaronesian endemics facing significant conservation challenges. Among these, Radula visianica is assessed as Critically Endangered, with fewer than 50 individuals remaining in Austria, while others are threatened by climate change, habitat modification, and increased fire frequency. Recent molecular phylogenetics analysis has refined understanding of relationships within the group, with the genus Porella identified as its closest relative.

== Systematics ==
=== Historical taxonomy ===
The family Radulaceae was first described based on the genus Radula, established by the Belgian botanist Barthélemy Charles Joseph Dumortier in 1822. A significant early treatment came from Richard Spruce in 1885, who established the subgenus Cladoradula based on specimens from tropical America. Spruce defined this group based on its short branches bearing reproductive organs (gynoecia without innovations (new shoots growing from the reproductive branches), relatively short protective sheaths around the reproductive organs (perianths), and nearly spherical spore capsules. Spruce later elevated the group to Radulineae, defined by keeled leaves with two unequal lobes, completely lacking underleaves, with perianths dorsiventrally flattened and truncate at the mouth, positioned at the end of the main shoot. The upper leaf lobe is 3-–4 times larger than the lower lobe, resulting in succubous leaf arrangement, and rhizoid bundles arise from the base of the lower lobes. For nearly 200 years, Radula remained the only genus in the family, making Radulaceae a monogeneric family within the order Porellales.

Herbert Castle's 1936 worldwide monograph of Radula took a broader view of Cladoradula, expanding it to include all species with reproductive structures on short branches, regardless of other features. This expansion increased the subgenus to 15 species with an almost worldwide distribution. However, later botanists, including Eustace W. Jones (1977), Kohsaku Yamada (1979), and Rudolf Mathias Schuster (1980), returned to a narrower definition more aligned with Spruce's original concept.

=== Modern molecular studies ===
DNA sequencing techniques developed in the late 20th century revealed new relationships within Radula. A comprehensive molecular phylogenetics study by Devos and colleagues in 2011 analysed DNA sequences from plants collected worldwide. This research consistently identified seven distinct evolutionary lineages (clades) within Radula, which were formally recognised as subgenera:

- subg. Amentuloradula
- subg. Cladoradula
- subg. Dactyloradula
- subg. Metaradula
- subg. Odontoradula
- subg. Radula
- subg. Volutoradula

Each of these subgenera had unique combinations of morphological features. For example, Amentuloradula was characterised by specialised branches resembling catkins, while Odontoradula typically had pointed leaf tips. The study revealed that subgenera Cladoradula and Dactyloradula were the earliest diverging lineages, representing the oldest evolutionary splits within the genus.

Of these seven groups, Radula and Cladoradula showed the widest geographical distributions, being found almost worldwide. Metaradula and Volutoradula were mainly tropical but extended into southern temperate regions. Amentuloradula and Odontoradula were largely restricted to Asia, Australasia and Oceania, while Dactyloradula was found only in East Asia and western North America.

=== 2022 taxonomic revision ===
Matthew Renner, Robbert Gradstein, and colleagues split the family Radulaceae into three genera in 2022, based on molecular and morphological evidence. Several key findings supported this taxonomic revision. Cretaceous fossils in Burmese amber (98 million years old) revealed the ages of different Radula groups. These studies revealed that the divergences between some groups were remarkably ancient, with some lineages being as old as many flowering plant families.

The two groups that were elevated to genus rank, Cladoradula and Dactyloradula, were found to have diverged from the main Radula lineage during the Jurassic or early Cretaceous periods. The original genus Radula predates most plant genera, with flowering plants, ferns, and other liverworts typically originating within the past 30–40 million years.

Additional factors influenced this taxonomic decision. The researchers identified several distinct morphological features that set these groups apart. Particularly significant was the way the leaf lobes (modified leaves characteristic of liverworts) attached to the stem. Both Cladoradula and Dactyloradula show a transverse (sideways) attachment, while all other species show a longitudinal (lengthwise) attachment. Additionally, both new genera possess a unique stem structure with an extra layer of cells called a subepidermis, which is absent in Radula.

The revision divided the family into three genera: Radula (comprising most species), Cladoradula (seven tropical and temperate species), and the monotypic Dactyloradula (D. brunnea from Japan). This reclassification aligned the family's taxonomy with both its morphological diversity and deep evolutionary divisions.

=== Classification ===
The taxonomic placement of Radulaceae indicates its distinct evolutionary history among liverwort groups. The family belongs to the order Radulales, representing a significant change from earlier treatments where Radulaceae was placed within the Porellales. Initially proposed as the suborder Radulinae by Rudolf Schuster in 1963, and later modified to Radulineae, the group has now been elevated to ordinal status. This elevation is supported by comprehensive phylogenomic analyses using 228 nuclear genes, which showed that the Radulales diverged from related groups during the Permian period. This taxonomic restructuring better aligns the age and evolutionary distinctiveness of Radulaceae with other liverwort orders. Molecular studies indicate Porella as its closest relative, sharing features such as bilobed leaves, perianth structure, and spore characteristics.

== Description ==
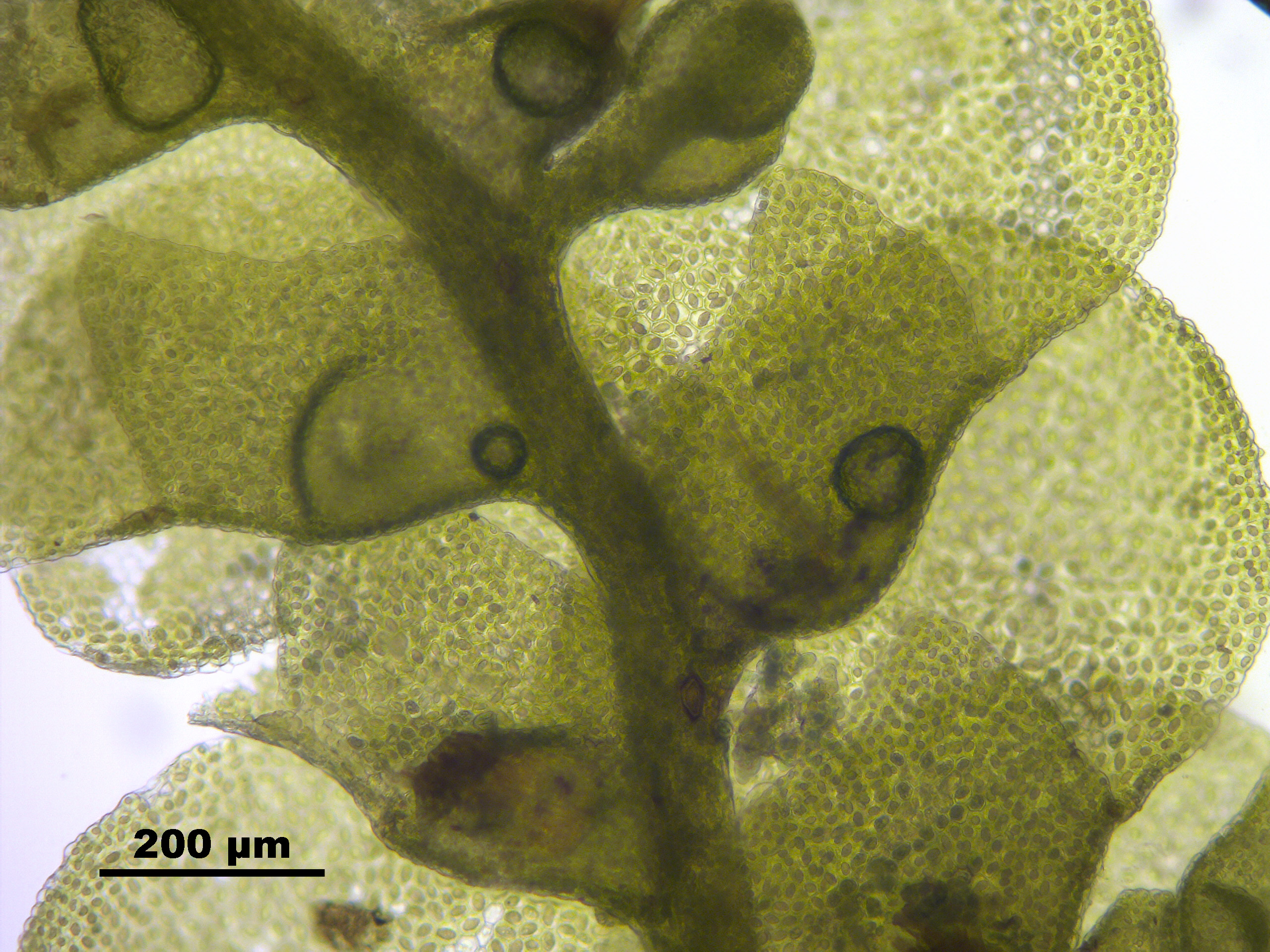
Microscopic view of Radula lindenbergiana showing characteristic bilobed leaves with cellular structure visible. The darker central region is the stem, with translucent leaf lobes extending outward. Scale bar: 200 μm

Radulaceae is a family of leafy liverworts with several distinctive characteristics that set it apart from other liverwort families. The plants lack underleaves (modified leaves on the stem's underside), a feature common in other leafy liverworts. Another unique feature is that rhizoids (root-like structures) are produced exclusively from the leaves rather than from the stem or underleaves. Specifically, these rhizoids emerge from a discrete zone above the middle of the folded portion of each leaf.

The leaves are bilobed (divided into two parts) and arranged in two rows along the stem. This bilobed leaf structure is one of several features shared with the related genus Porella, along with the dorso-ventrally compressed perianths, two-layered spore capsule walls, free elaters (specialised cells that help disperse spores), and spores with a distinctive echinate (spiny) surface pattern. The cells contain one or two large, brown oil bodies that typically occupy most of the cell space. A characteristic feature of the family is its relatively flat (dorso-ventrally compressed) perianths, which are protective structures surrounding the reproductive organs.

The family is also distinguished by its branching pattern, known as Radula-type branching, which is found almost exclusively in this group. The only exception occurs when the shoot tip is damaged, in which case the plants may produce Lejeunea-type branches instead. The sporophytes (spore-producing structures) emerge from the perianth and feature a capsule that can split open either straight or in a spiral pattern, with varying patterns of wall thickening. The spores themselves show considerable variation in size and surface patterns.

== Distinction between genera ==
The three genera of Radulaceae can be distinguished by several key morphological features, particularly in their stem anatomy and leaf arrangement. These differences reflect their long evolutionary separation. Radula, the largest genus, has leaves that attach longitudinally to the stem. The stems lack a subepidermis (additional cell layer beneath the epidermis) and typically develop innovations, or new shoots, from reproductive branches. Perianth length (protective sheaths around reproductive organs) varies considerably among species. Members of this genus can be found across the globe in diverse habitats.

Cladoradula species share several distinctive features that set them apart from Radula. Their leaves attach to the stem transversely (sideways) rather than lengthwise, and their stems possess a distinctive subepidermis of one to three cell layers. The stem cortex (outer region) is heavily thickened and brown-pigmented, giving these plants a characteristic appearance. Unlike Radula, most Cladoradula species lack innovations on their reproductive branches, with the exception of C. tenax. They typically produce short perianths and often form large, regularly branched plant bodies. The genus is primarily found in tropical and warm temperate regions.

Dactyloradula, which contains only one species, D. brunnea, combines some characteristics of both other genera while maintaining its own unique features. Like Cladoradula, it shows transverse leaf attachment and possesses a subepidermis, though in this case specifically two-layered. What makes this genus truly distinctive is the presence of finger-like appendages at the base of each leaf lobe, a feature not found in any other members of the family. The genus also produces specialised small-leaved branches, known as amentulose branches. Dactyloradula is geographically restricted, found only in Japan.

== Distribution and habitat ==
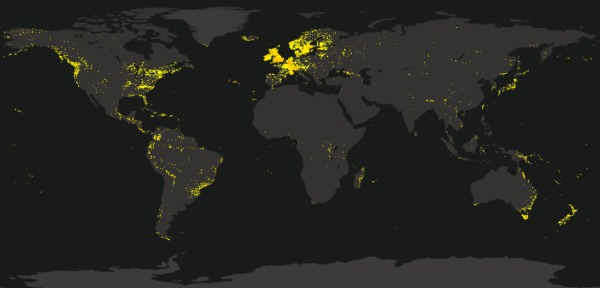
The occurrence of Radulaceae species around the world, based on GBIF occurrence data

The family Radulaceae has a worldwide distribution, though individual genera show distinct geographical patterns. The largest genus, Radula, is found globally across diverse habitats. Cladoradula shows a disjunct distribution pattern, occurring in several widely separated regions: it is found in submontane and montane regions of tropical America and Africa, throughout tropical Asia and the Pacific region, and in subtropical and warm-temperate regions of eastern Asia. It also occurs in eastern North America, specifically in the Appalachian Mountains, and along the Pacific coast of Canada and Alaska. Notably, Cladoradula is absent from the subtropical and temperate regions of the Southern Hemisphere, including Australasia. The smallest genus, Dactyloradula, is geographically restricted, being endemic to Japan.

Radula species can be found growing on bark, rotting wood, living leaves, rocks, and sometimes on soil. Cladoradula species typically grow on the bark of trees and shrubs, as well as on shaded rocks in submontane and lower montane forests, where they often adopt a pendant growth habit. They can be found at elevations ranging from 400 to 2,100 metres above sea level. Radula species occur from sea level to approximately 4,000 metres elevation.

Several studies published since 2000 have enumerated the Radulaceae taxa occurring in certain defined geographical areas. These include:

- New Zealand and Tasmania – 36 spp.
- South Pacific – 24 spp.
- the Russian Far East – 8 spp.
- Brazil – 31 species
- Madagascar – 13 spp.
- Thailand – 9 spp.

== Conservation ==
Several Radulaceae species, particularly those endemic to the Macaronesian region, face conservation challenges. Of the assessed species, some face significant threats from climate change and habitat modification, while others appear more secure. Among the species evaluated by the IUCN, Radula visianica, endemic to Europe, is assessed as Critically Endangered, with fewer than 50 individual-equivalents (patches or colonies that function as single reproductive units) remaining in five localities in Austria. It has already gone extinct in Italy where it was historically known from two localities.

Radula jonesii, endemic to Macaronesia, is assessed as Endangered due to having fewer than 2,500 individual-equivalents across its range in the Canary Islands and Madeira. The species faces ongoing population decline, particularly in Tenerife where recent storms have damaged its habitat.

Several species are assessed as Near Threatened. These include Radula wichurae, which is endemic to Macaronesia; Radula holtii, which is found in southwestern Ireland, Britain, northwest Spain, Portugal and Macaronesia; and Radula carringtonii, which is restricted to western Ireland, Scotland, and Macaronesia. In contrast, Radula aguirrei, which is endemic to Colombia and known only from Gorgona Island in Cauca at 250 metres above sea level, is assessed as Least Concern due to its occurrence in a well-preserved protected area.

Radulaceae species face multiple interconnected threats. Climate change particularly affects Macaronesian populations through increased temperatures and drought stress. Habitat modification through forestry plantations and overgrazing poses challenges, as does water abstraction for hydroelectric schemes, particularly affecting populations in Ireland and Scotland. Additional pressures come from increased fire frequency, the spread of invasive alien plant species, and various anthropogenic activities, including poorly managed ecotourism.

Many threatened species occur within protected areas, including Special Areas of Conservation under the EU Habitats Directive, and UNESCO World Heritage sites. The laurel forests of Macaronesia, which host several endemic Radula species, are protected through regional, national, and international legislation. As poikilohydric organisms, these species are particularly sensitive to humidity and temperature changes.

Conservation strategies for threatened species include monitoring population dynamics and habitat conditions, implementation of ex situ conservation programmes, and protection of remaining natural habitats, particularly ancient laurel forests. Management of ecotourism in sensitive areas and research on climate change responses complement these efforts.
