= C21H32O3 =

The molecular formula C_{21}H_{32}O_{3} (molar mass: 332.48 g/mol) may refer to:

- Alfaxalone
- Androstenediol 3β-acetate
- Androstenediol 17β-acetate
- BNN-27
- Dihydrodeoxycorticosterone
- Dihydrotestosterone acetate
- Hydroxydione, a neurosteroid
- Hydroxypregnenolones
  - 17α-Hydroxypregnenolone
  - 21-Hydroxypregnenolone
- Hydroxyhexahydrocannabinols
  - 8-Hydroxyhexahydrocannabinol
  - 9-Hydroxyhexahydrocannabinol
  - 10-Hydroxyhexahydrocannabinol
  - 11-Hydroxyhexahydrocannabinol
- Oxymetholone
- 5α-Pregnan-17α-ol-3,20-dione
- Renanolone
