= Hydroxyhexahydrocannabinol =

Hydroxyhexahydrocannabinol may refer to:

- 8-Hydroxyhexahydrocannabinol
- 9-Hydroxyhexahydrocannabinol
- 10-Hydroxyhexahydrocannabinol
- 11-Hydroxyhexahydrocannabinol
