= Hexahydrocannabutol =

Chemical compound

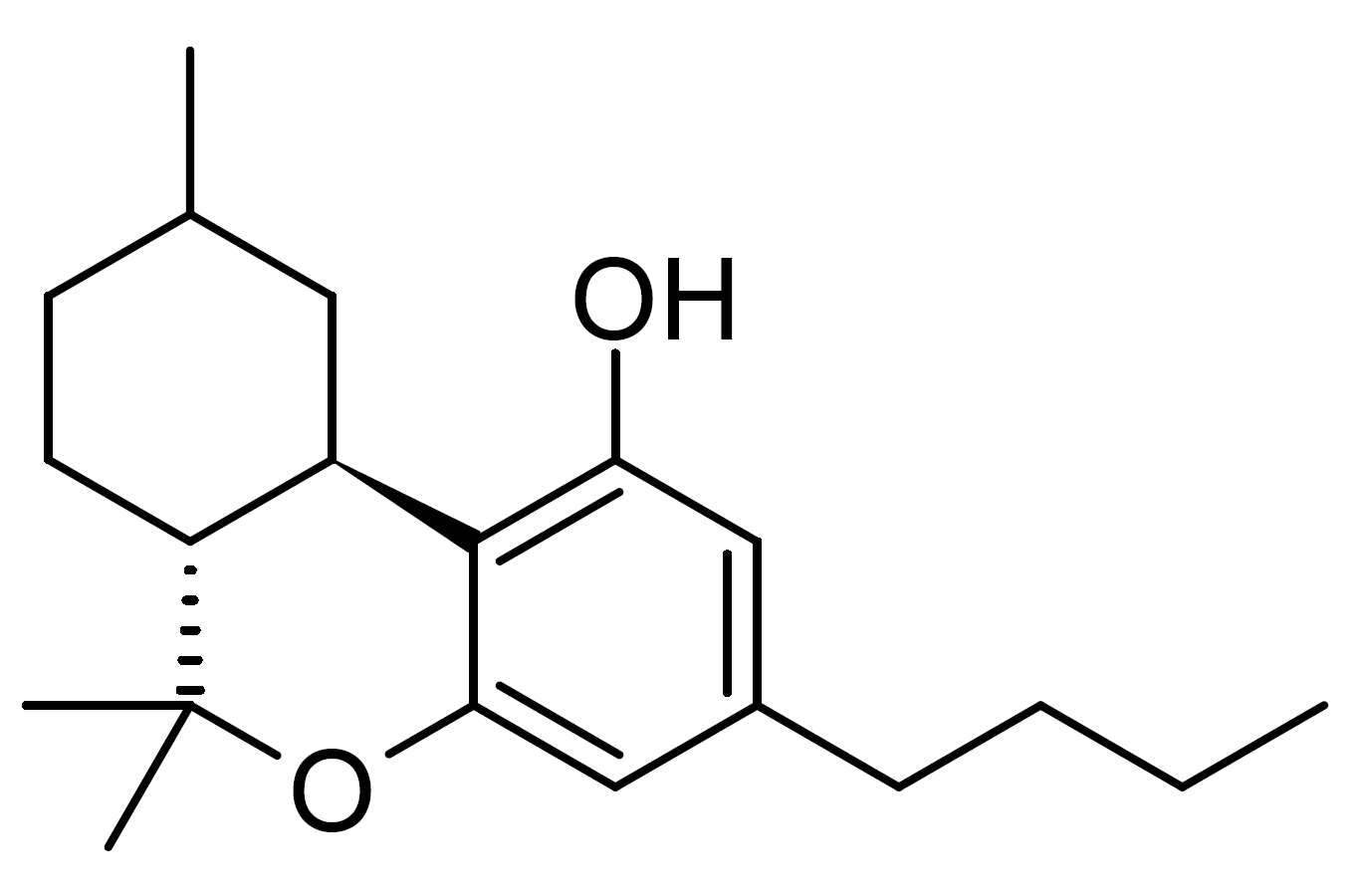

Identifiers
- IUPAC name: (6aR,10aR)-6,6,9-trimethyl-3-butyl-6a,7,8,9,10,10a-hexahydrobenzo[c]chromen-1-ol
- CAS Number: 1349000-38-9

Chemical and physical data
- Formula: C_{20}H_{30}O_{2}
- Molar mass: 302.458 g·mol^{−1}
- 3D model (JSmol): Interactive image
- SMILES: CCCCc1cc2OC(C)(C)[C@@H]3CCC(C)C[C@H]3c2c(O)c1
- InChI: InChI=1S/C20H30O2/c1-5-6-7-14-11-17(21)19-15-10-13(2)8-9-16(15)20(3,4)22-18(19)12-14/h11-13,15-16,21H,5-10H2,1-4H3/t13?,15-,16-/m1/s1; Key:UGRLMQVLYLFVDE-GNHXQJIDSA-N

Hexahydrocannabutol (HHCB, HHC-B) is a semi-synthetic cannabinoid derivative, the hydrogenated derivative of tetrahydrocannabutol (THCB). It was first synthesised by Roger Adams in 1942 and produces only weak cannabinoid-like effects in animals. More recently it has been sold as an ingredient in grey-market cannabinoid products.

== See also ==
- Hexahydrocannabinol
- Hexahydrocannabivarin
- Hexahydrocannabihexol
- Hexahydrocannabiphorol
