= HHCP-O-acetate =

Semi-synthetic cannabinoid derivative drug

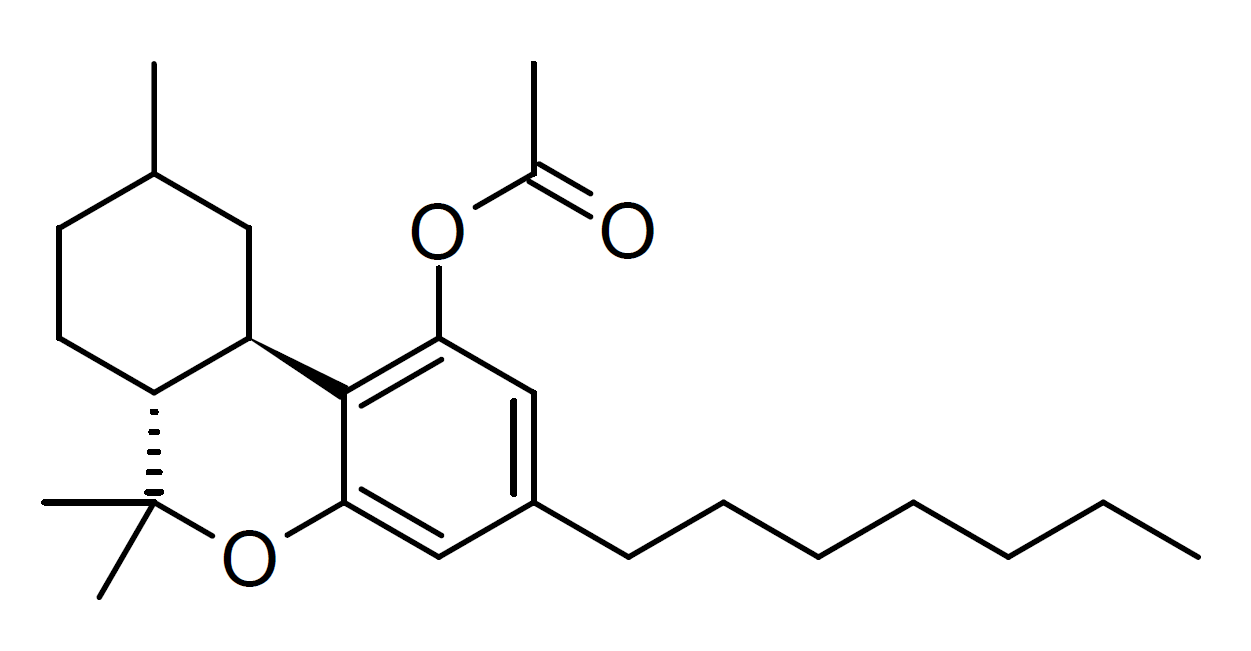

Identifiers
- IUPAC name: (6aR,10aR)-6,6,9-trimethyl-3-heptyl-6a,7,8,9,10,10a-hexahydrobenzo[c]chromen-1-yl acetate
- CAS Number: 2829292-83-1
- ChemSpider: 128938021

Chemical and physical data
- Formula: C_{25}H_{38}O_{3}
- Molar mass: 386.576 g·mol^{−1}
- 3D model (JSmol): Interactive image
- SMILES: CC(=O)Oc1cc(CCCCCCC)cc2OC(C)(C)[C@@H]3CCC(C)C[C@H]3c21
- InChI: InChI=1S/C25H38O3/c1-6-7-8-9-10-11-19-15-22(27-18(3)26)24-20-14-17(2)12-13-21(20)25(4,5)28-23(24)16-19/h15-17,20-21H,6-14H2,1-5H3/t17?,20-,21-/m1/s1; Key:LRVWJGANNJYLTC-LTGQRPFBSA-N

HHCP-O-acetate (HHCPO, HHCP-O) is a semi-synthetic derivative of tetrahydrocannabiphorol (THCP) derived in several steps by hydrogenation to hexahydrocannabiphorol (HHCP) followed by acetylation of the OH group. It has been found as a component of grey-market cannabis products such as e-cigarette liquids and edible gumdrops, and is allegedly a potent and long-lasting psychoactive cannabinoid.

== Confusion about acronym ==
Some vendors have mistakenly claimed that HHCPO stands for hexahydrocannabinol propionate (HHC-P) or hexahydrocannabinol cyclopropyl ether, but these are different compounds.

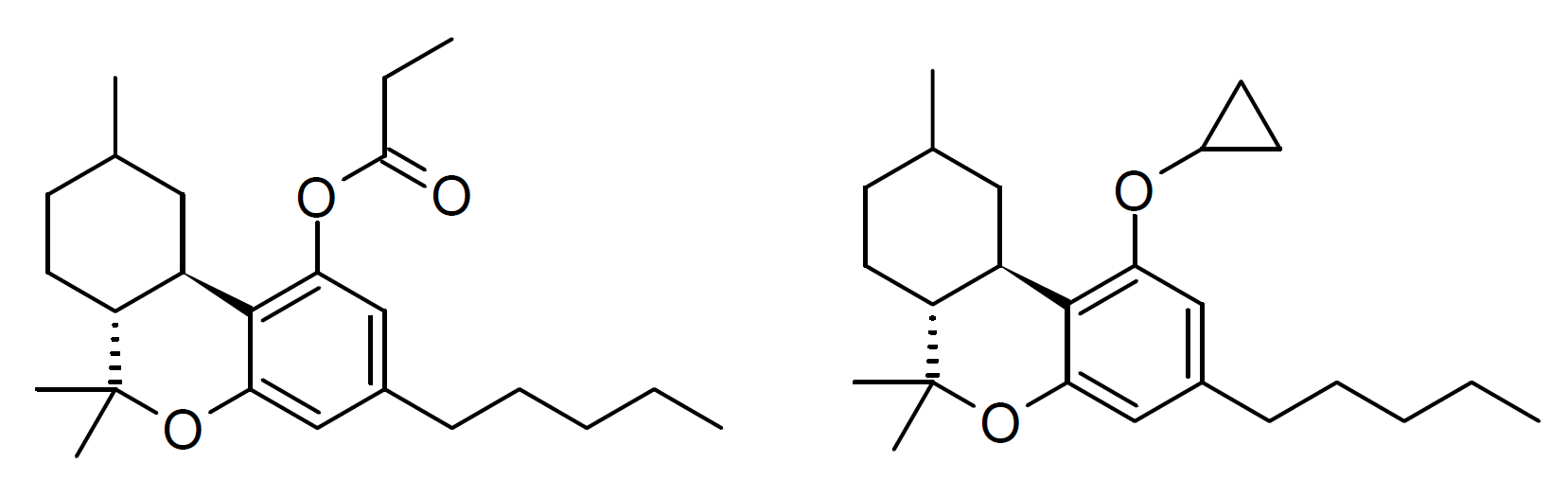
Hexahydrocannabinol propionate (left) and Hexahydrocannabinol cyclopropyl ether (right)

== See also ==
- Abeo-HHC acetate
- Hexahydrocannabinol
- Hexahydrocannabihexol
- THC-O-acetate
- THCP-O-acetate
