= 10-Hydroxyhexahydrocannabinol =

Identifiers
- IUPAC name: (6aR,10R,10aR)-6,6,9-trimethyl-3-pentyl-6a,7,10,10a-hexhydro-6H-dibenzo[b,d]pyran-1,10-diol
- PubChem CID: 44266786
- ChemSpider: 23110560
- ChEMBL: ChEMBL10488

Chemical and physical data
- Formula: C_{21}H_{32}O_{3}
- Molar mass: 332.484 g·mol^{−1}
- 3D model (JSmol): Interactive image
- SMILES: CC1(C)Oc2cc(CCCCC)cc(O)c2[C@@H]2[C@@H](O)C(C)CC[C@H]21
- InChI: InChI=1S/C21H32O3/c1-5-6-7-8-14-11-16(22)19-17(12-14)24-21(3,4)15-10-9-13(2)20(23)18(15)19/h11-13,15,18,20,22-23H,5-10H2,1-4H3/t13?,15-,18?,20+/m1/s1; Key:SUVXTOCRTNYFMQ-HQODNEQVSA-N

10-Hydroxyhexahydrocannabinol (10-OH-HHC) is a semi-synthetic cannabinoid which has been sold as a designer drug, first identified in Germany in December 2024.

== See also ==
- 8-Hydroxyhexahydrocannabinol (8-OH-HHC)
- 9-Hydroxyhexahydrocannabinol (9-OH-HHC)
- 11-Hydroxyhexahydrocannabinol (11-OH-HHC)
- 10-Hydroxy-THC
- 10-Hydroxy-HHCP
- Hexahydrocannabinol (HHC)
