= Hexahydrocannabivarin =

Chemical compound

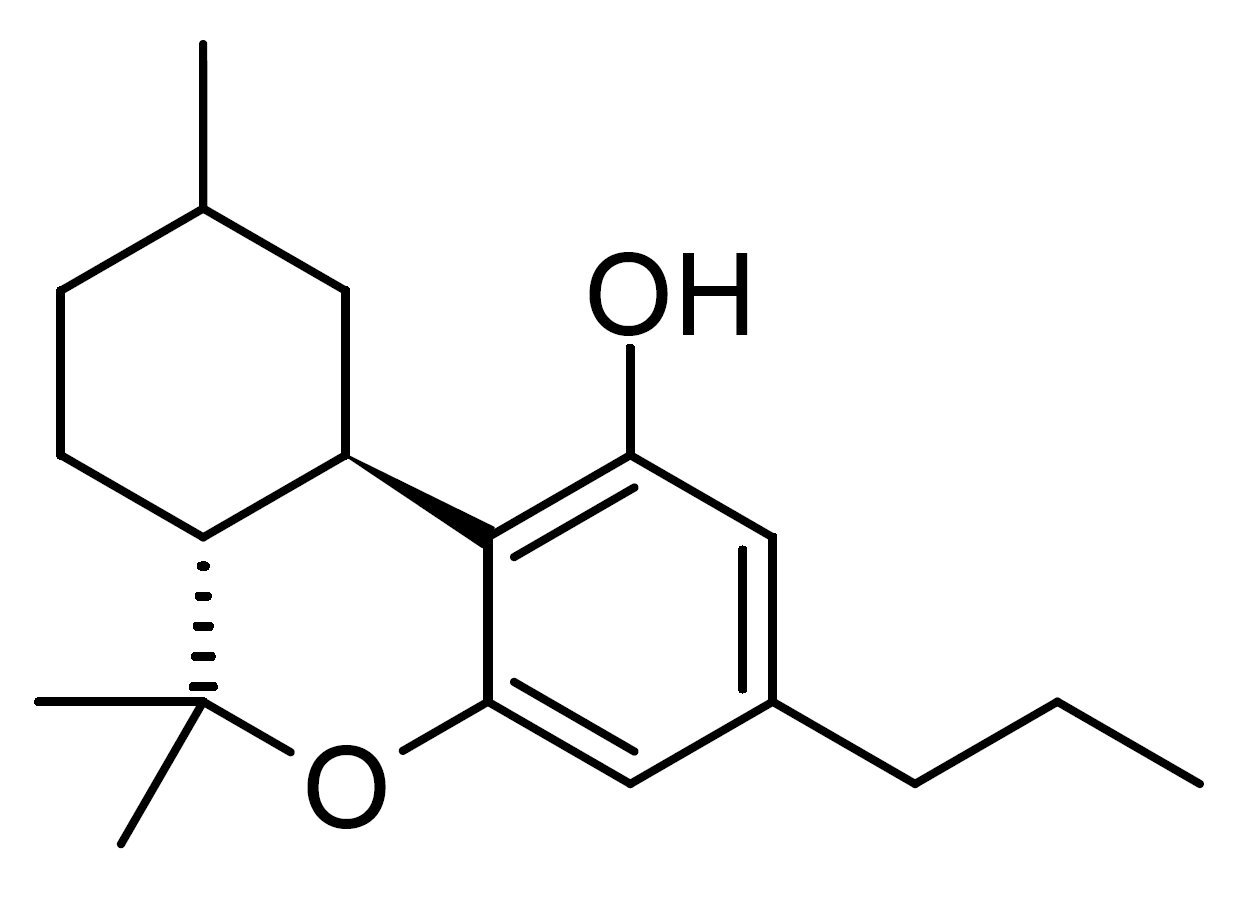

Identifiers
- IUPAC name: (6aR,10aR)-6,6,9-trimethyl-3-propyl-6a,7,8,9,10,10a-hexahydrobenzo[c]chromen-1-ol
- CAS Number: 2891843-80-2

Chemical and physical data
- Formula: C_{19}H_{28}O_{2}
- Molar mass: 288.431 g·mol^{−1}
- 3D model (JSmol): Interactive image
- SMILES: CCCc1cc2OC(C)(C)[C@@H]3CCC(C)C[C@H]3c2c(O)c1
- InChI: InChI=InChI=1S/C19H28O2/c1-5-6-13-10-16(20)18-14-9-12(2)7-8-15(14)19(3,4)21-17(18)11-13/h10-12,14-15,20H,5-9H2,1-4H3/t12?,14-,15-/m1/s1; Key:QYNCMPYNYFYQFE-JENMUQSASA-N

Hexahydrocannabivarin (HHCV, HHC-V) is a semi-synthetic cannabinoid derivative, the hydrogenated derivative of tetrahydrocannabivarin (THCV). It was first synthesised by Roger Adams in 1942 and produces only weak cannabinoid-like effects in animals. More recently it has been sold as an ingredient in grey-market cannabinoid products. It has been investigated for potential antineoplastic activity in vitro.

== See also ==
- Hexahydrocannabinol
- Hexahydrocannabutol
- Hexahydrocannabihexol
- Hexahydrocannabiphorol
