= Cannabiripsol =

Chemical compound

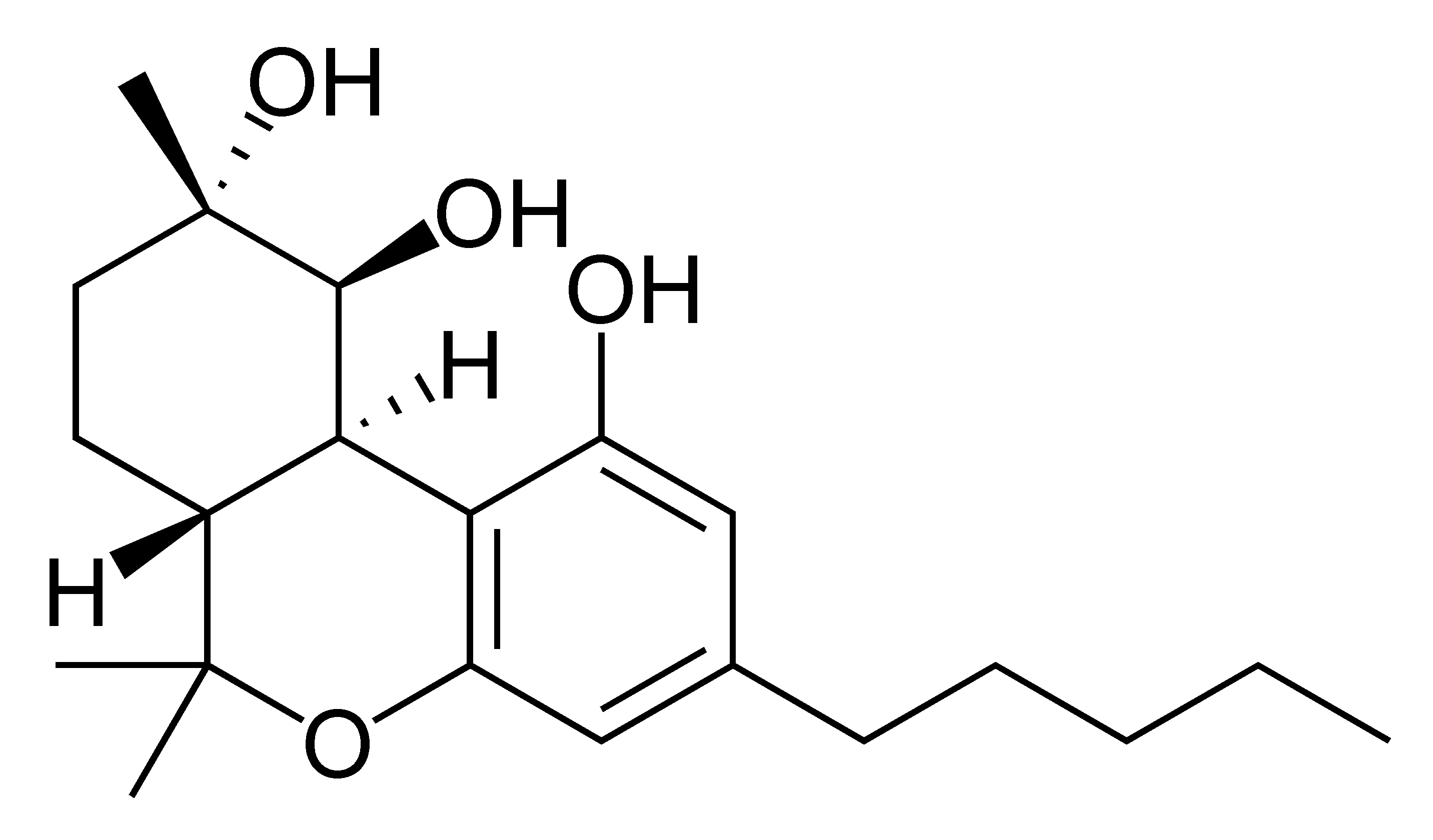

Identifiers
- IUPAC name: (6aR,9S,10S,10aR)-6,6,9-trimethyl-3-pentyl-7,8,10,10a-tetrahydro-6aH-benzo[c]chromene-1,9,10-triol
- CAS Number: 72236-32-9
- PubChem CID: 192007
- ChemSpider: 166692
- UNII: 4P2CG6T3K9
- ChEMBL: ChEMBL3586111
- CompTox Dashboard (EPA): DTXSID90222552

Chemical and physical data
- Formula: C_{21}H_{32}O_{4}
- Molar mass: 348.483 g·mol^{−1}
- 3D model (JSmol): Interactive image
- SMILES: CCCCCC1=CC(=C2[C@H]3[C@@H](CC[C@]([C@H]3O)(C)O)C(OC2=C1)(C)C)O
- InChI: InChI=1S/C21H32O4/c1-5-6-7-8-13-11-15(22)18-16(12-13)25-20(2,3)14-9-10-21(4,24)19(23)17(14)18/h11-12,14,17,19,22-24H,5-10H2,1-4H3/t14-,17-,19+,21+/m1/s1; Key:TZGCTXUTNDNTTE-DYZHCLJRSA-N

Cannabiripsol is a minor phytocannabinoid with a hexahydrocannabinol backbone, found in trace amounts in the cannabis plant. While it lacks activity at cannabinoid receptors, its activity at other targets has not been studied.

== See also ==
- 8-Hydroxyhexahydrocannabinol
- 9-Hydroxyhexahydrocannabinol
- 8,11-Dihydroxytetrahydrocannabinol
- Cannabitriol
