= C25H38O3 =

The molecular formula C_{25}H_{38}O_{3} (molar mass: 386.57 g/mol) may refer to:

- AM-2389
- Dexanabinol (HU-211)
- HHCP-O-acetate
- HU-210
- Testosterone isocaproate
- Testosterone caproate
