= C19H28O2 =

The molecular formula C_{19}H_{28}O_{2} (molar mass: 288.42 g/mol, exact Mass: 288.20893) may refer to:

- Androstanedione
- 1-Androsterone
- Benorterone, an antiandrogen
- Dehydroandrosterone
- Dehydroepiandrosterone, a neurosteroid
- 4-Dehydroepiandrosterone
- Epitestosterone
- Etiocholanedione
- Hexahydrocannabivarin
- Methylestrenolone
- 11β-Methyl-19-nortestosterone
- Prasterone
- Testosterone
- 1-Testosterone, an anabolic steroid
- Trestolone
