= Cannabis in Cyprus =

- Location of Cyprus (dark green)
- Medicinal: Legal
- Recreational: Illegal

Legality of cannabis in Europe Legal for recreational use Legal for medical use Illegal

Cannabis in Cyprus is illegal for recreational use but legal for medical use.

== Prohibition ==
Drugs are categorized into three categories in Cyprus. Drugs classified as A, B, or C. Cannabis is classified as a class B drug. The Narcotic Drugs and Psychotropic Substances Act of 1977 classified cannabis as a Class B substance. Class A medicines are the most dangerous, while class C drugs are the least dangerous. On the other hand, drug use and possession consequences apply to all classes.

Personal possession is a serious criminal offense in Cyprus, and the subject has to face aggravating circumstances for the crime

- Class A Drugs: Up to twelve years imprisonment
- Class B drugs: Up to eight years imprisonment
- Class C drugs: Up to four years imprisonment

=== Arrest ===
In practice, an offender is taken to a local police station by drug enforcement where a statement, fingerprints, and/or a confession are taken. After minor interrogation, the offender is held overnight and then released to be later called to court where a judge will set a fine between 400-1000 Euro for a first time offence (depending on the amount of cannabis found and severity of the case). Factors such as being helpful to the police, full confession, completion of 6 month "detox" program provided by government and an apologetic attitude towards the judge does indeed help obtain a reduced fine.

=== Drug rehabilitation ===
The offender must appear at a detox center and complete a 6-month drug rehabilitation program at the end of which a relevant officer will send a letter to the judge in regard to their accomplishment. They will also receive an honorary diploma upon completion of the program. Non-completion of this 6-month program has unconfirmed consequences such as the fine being higher when sentenced at court.

=== Laws for selling cannabis or drug trafficking ===
Selling or dealing in class C pharmaceuticals might result in up to eight years in jail, whereas dealing in class A or B medications could result in life imprisonment.

However, no one has been sentenced to life in prison yet.

== Medical use ==
Cyprus legalized the medical use of cannabis oil in January 2017, for use by advanced state cancer patients only. In February 2019 a more expansive law was passed that increased the number of qualifying medical conditions.

=== Cultivation ===
The island state has a comparative advantage over many other seasoned cannabis-producing states such as the Netherlands or Portugal. Its ideal climate conditions and its long periods of sunshine are very favorable to plant growth. The fact that it also belongs to the EU single market allows firms to base their operation on the island and passport services across various EU states without further regulatory checks. According to forecasts, Cyprus can produce more than €236 (£204) million worth of medicinal cannabis each year.

=== CBD Products’ legal status ===
CBD products containing more than 0.2% of THC are illegal in Cyprus. These are accessible in the form of edibles, cannabis-infused foods, lotions, cremes, cannabis oil, etc. Regardless, a merchant is not permitted to mention the health benefits of such items.

=== HHC Products’ legal status ===
HHC is a new, semi-synthetic cannabinoid. It began to be sold in Cyprus at the end of 2022. The compound has been growing increasingly popular in Cyprus and the EU due to producing similar effects to THC, but being available to be bought legally in a store or even online. HHC in Cyprus is accessible in the different forms for any choice: dried, vaping, edibles, oils.

== Legalization efforts ==
In de facto independent Northern Cyprus, the first 420 event was held in the capital city Lefkoşa in 2015. On April 20, 2017 a small group of protesters carried out an event near the parliament building and made a public statement, demanding the legalization of cannabis sale, consumption, and production within state regulations. Volt Cyprus launched a proposal in 2025, calling for the legalisation and regulation of cannabis in Cyprus.

== See also ==
- Cannabis in Northern Cyprus
