= C23H36O3 =

The molecular formula C_{23}H_{36}O_{3} may refer to:

- Dihydrotestosterone butyrate
- Drostanolone propionate, an anabolic steroid
- Methandriol propionate
- Propetandrol
- 10-Hydroxy-HHCP
