= HHC-acetate =

Semi-synthetic cannabinoid drug

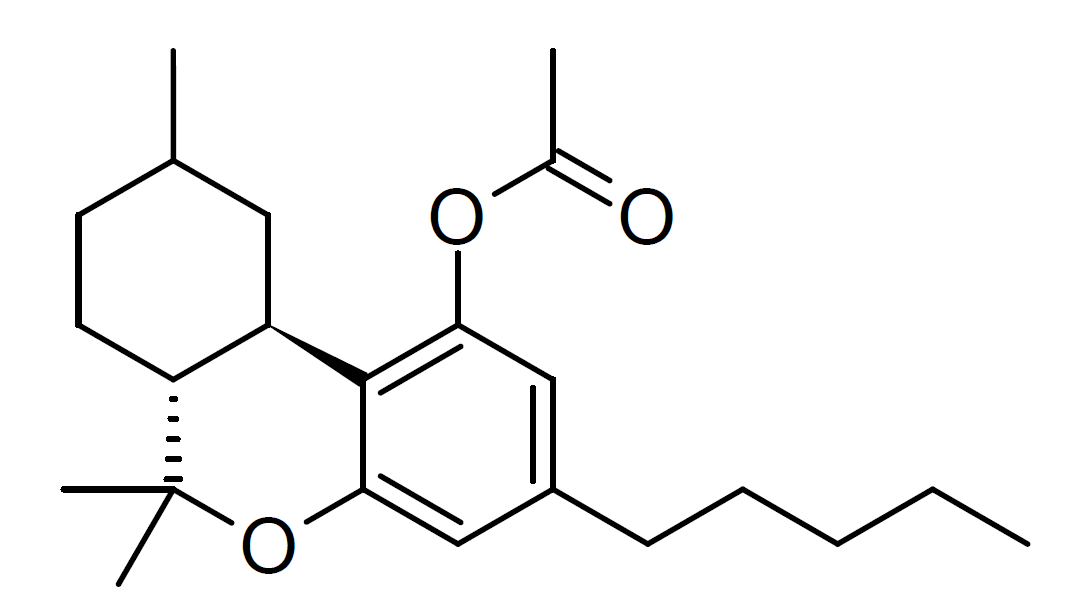

Identifiers
- IUPAC name: [(6aR,10aR)-6,6,9-trimethyl-3-pentyl-6a,7,8,9,10,10a-hexahydrobenzo[c]chromen-1-yl] acetate
- PubChem CID: 165412103
- ChemSpider: 115285240
- UNII: FA3U4A4VSR

Chemical and physical data
- Formula: C_{23}H_{34}O_{3}
- Molar mass: 358.522 g·mol^{−1}
- 3D model (JSmol): Interactive image
- SMILES: CCCCCC1=CC2=C([C@@H]3CC(CC[C@H]3C(O2)(C)C)C)C(=C1)OC(=O)C
- InChI: InChI=1S/C23H34O3/c1-6-7-8-9-17-13-20(25-16(3)24)22-18-12-15(2)10-11-19(18)23(4,5)26-21(22)14-17/h13-15,18-19H,6-12H2,1-5H3/t15?,18-,19-/m1/s1; Key:ZAZIHGFBNRVMAI-JCNKGUCWSA-N

HHC-acetate (hexahydrocannabinol-O-acetate, HHC-O) is a semi-synthetic cannabinoid derivative which has been marketed since around 2022.

== Synthesis and chemistry ==
It is believed to be made in a three step process from cannabidiol extracted from industrial hemp by synthesis of Delta-8-THC from CBD, then hydrogenation of Delta-8-THC to Hexahydrocannabinol, then finally acetylation of HHC.

== Legality ==
The legal status of hexahydrocannabinol and derivatives such as HHC-O varies between countries leading to widespread sale in some jurisdictions in Europe and the US, but in France HHC and HHC-O were banned in 2023, and HHC is already banned in several other countries. This molecule has also been banned in the Czech Republic.

== See also ==
- Abeo-HHC acetate
- Cannabidiol diacetate
- THC-O-acetate
- THCP-O-acetate
- Hexahydrocannabiphorol
