= Cannabitriol =

Group of isomers

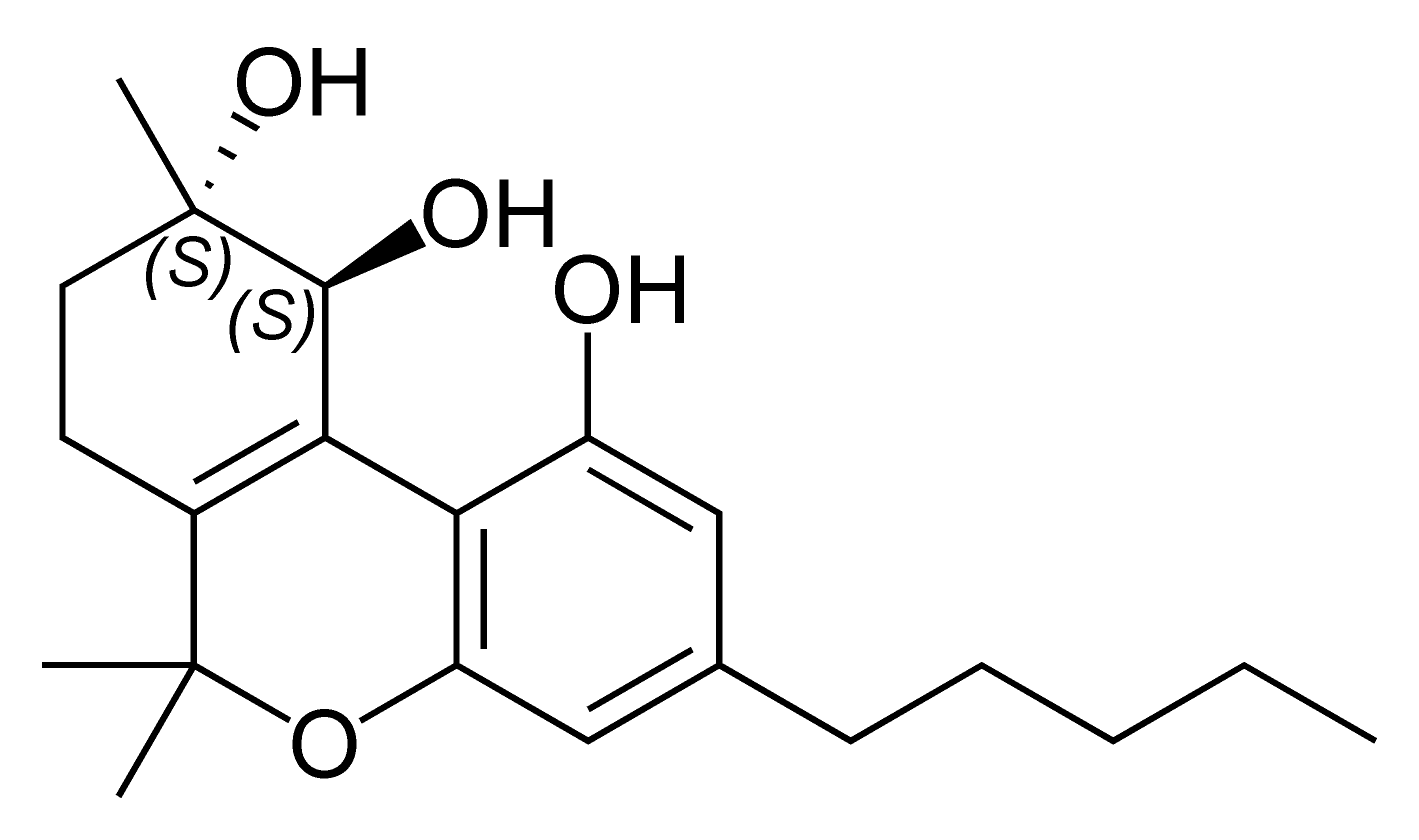

Clinical data
- Other names: (+)-CBT, (S,S)-9,10-Dihydroxy-Δ^{6a(10a)}-THC

Identifiers
- IUPAC name: (9S,10S)-6,6,9-trimethyl-3-pentyl-8,10-dihydro-7H-benzo[c]chromene-1,9,10-triol
- CAS Number: 74184-29-5 11003-36-4 (racemic)
- PubChem CID: 156460
- ChemSpider: 137777
- UNII: FV3E92D97V
- CompTox Dashboard (EPA): DTXSID80911448

Chemical and physical data
- Formula: C_{21}H_{30}O_{4}
- Molar mass: 346.467 g·mol^{−1}
- 3D model (JSmol): Interactive image
- SMILES: CCCCCC1=CC(=C2C(=C1)OC(C3=C2[C@@H]([C@@](CC3)(C)O)O)(C)C)O
- InChI: InChI=1S/C21H30O4/c1-5-6-7-8-13-11-15(22)18-16(12-13)25-20(2,3)14-9-10-21(4,24)19(23)17(14)18/h11-12,19,22-24H,5-10H2,1-4H3/t19-,21-/m0/s1; Key:ZLYNXDIDWUWASO-FPOVZHCZSA-N

Cannabitriol (CBT) is a phytocannabinoid first isolated in 1966, an oxidation product of tetrahydrocannabinol (THC) which has been identified both as a trace component of cannabis and as a metabolite in cannabis users. Its pharmacology has been little studied, though it has been found to act as an antiestrogen and aromatase inhibitor.

== See also ==
- 8,11-Dihydroxy-THC
- 9-OH-HHC
- Cannabicitran (CBTC)
- Cannabiripsol
- Delta-3-THC
