= 9-Nor-9β-hydroxyhexahydrocannabinol =

Chemical compound

Identifiers
- IUPAC name: 6,6-Dimethyl-3-pentyl-6a,7,8,9,10,10a-hexahydrobenzo[c]chromene-1,9-diol
- CAS Number: 52171-85-4
- PubChem CID: 6452587
- ChemSpider: 23232433
- UNII: NA3QQQ5D4S
- CompTox Dashboard (EPA): DTXSID30966529

Chemical and physical data
- Formula: C_{20}H_{30}O_{3}
- Molar mass: 318.457 g·mol^{−1}
- 3D model (JSmol): Interactive image
- SMILES: CCCCCc1cc(c2c(c1)OC([C@H]3[C@H]2C[C@@H](CC3)O)(C)C)O
- InChI: InChI=1S/C20H30O3/c1-4-5-6-7-13-10-17(22)19-15-12-14(21)8-9-16(15)20(2,3)23-18(19)11-13/h10-11,14-16,21-22H,4-9,12H2,1-3H3/t14-,15-,16-/m1/s1; Key:AAIHVZNCFQTVCA-BZUAXINKSA-N

9-Nor-9β-hydroxyhexahydrocannabinol (9-nor-9beta-HHC; sometimes incorrectly confused with 11-nor-9β-hydroxyhexahydrocannabinol) is a cannabinoid first discovered from early modifications to the structure of THC, in a search for the simplest compound that could still fulfill the binding requirements to produce cannabis-like activity.

11-Hydroxyhexahydrocannabinol is the structurally related methylene homologue of 11-nor-9β-hydroxyhexahydrocannabinol that has been found as a minor active metabolite of tetrahydrocannabinol, and also a metabolite of the trace cannabinoid hexahydrocannabinol.

== See also ==
- AM-2389
- 9-Hydroxyhexahydrocannabinol
- Hexahydrocannabinol
- 11-Hydroxyhexahydrocannabinol
- HU-243
- Nabilone
