= Tetrahydrocannabivarin =

Homologue of tetrahydrocannabinol

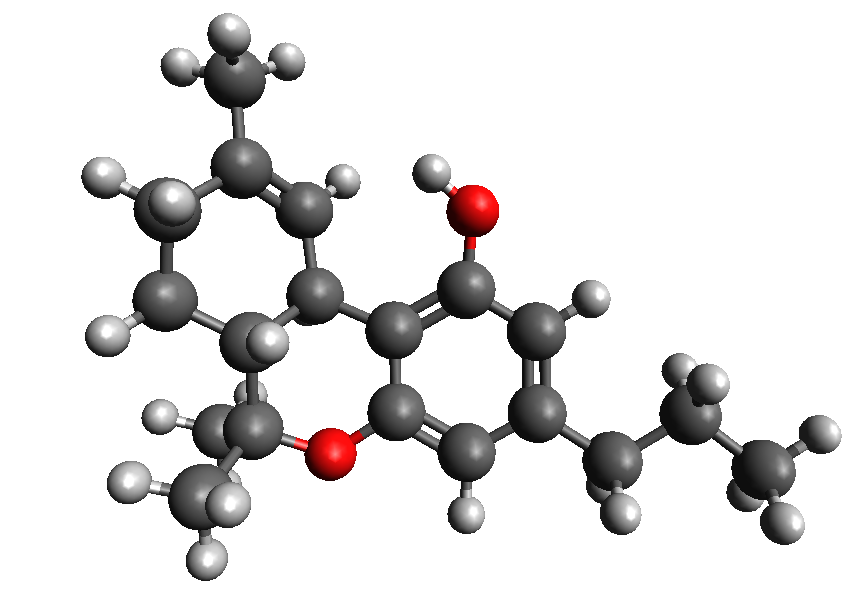

Clinical data
- Routes of administration: Oral, smoked, inhaled
- ATC code: None

Legal status
- Legal status: US: Unscheduled; Also legal in UK, Canada and Netherlands

Identifiers
- IUPAC name: 6,6,9-Trimethyl-3-propyl-6a,7,8,10a-tetrahydro-6H-benzo[c]chromen-1-ol
- CAS Number: 31262-37-0
- PubChem CID: 34180
- IUPHAR/BPS: 6418
- ChemSpider: 31500
- UNII: I5YE3I47D8
- CompTox Dashboard (EPA): DTXSID50950920

Chemical and physical data
- Formula: C_{19}H_{26}O_{2}
- Molar mass: 286.415 g·mol^{−1}
- 3D model (JSmol): Interactive image
- SMILES: CCCC1=CC2=C(C3C=C(CCC3C(O2)(C)C)C)C(=C1)O
- InChI: InChI=1S/C19H26O2/c1-5-6-13-10-16(20)18-14-9-12(2)7-8-15(14)19(3,4)21-17(18)11-13/h9-11,14-15,20H,5-8H2,1-4H3/t14-,15-/m1/s1; Key:ZROLHBHDLIHEMS-HUUCEWRRSA-N

Tetrahydrocannabivarin (THCV, THV, O-4394, GWP42004) is a homologue of tetrahydrocannabinol (THC) having a propyl (3-carbon) side chain instead of pentyl (5-carbon), making it non-psychoactive in lower doses. It has been shown to exhibit neuroprotective activity, appetite suppression, glycemic control and reduced side effects compared to THC, making it a potential treatment for management of obesity and diabetes. THCV was studied by Roger Adams as early as 1942.

THCV is prevalent in certain central Asian and southern African strains of Cannabis.

== Pharmacology ==
=== Mechanism of action ===
THCV is a somewhat selective cannabinoid receptor type 1 antagonist or, at higher doses, a CB_{1} receptor agonist and cannabinoid receptor type 2 partial agonist. The isomer Δ^{8}-THCV has also been shown to be a CB_{1} antagonist. Both papers describing the antagonistic properties of THCV were demonstrated in murine models. THCV is an antagonist of CB_{1} receptors and lessens the psychoactive effects of THC.

THCV also acts as an agonist of GPR55 and l-α-lysophosphatidylinositol (LPI), and beyond the endocannabinoid system, THCV also activate 5-HT1A receptors to produce an antipsychotic effect, that has shown therapeutic potential for ameliorating some of the negative, cognitive and positive symptoms of schizophrenia. THCV furthermore interacts with different transient receptor potential (TRP) channels including TRPV2, which may contribute to the analgesic, anti-inflammatory and anti-cancer effects of cannabinoids and Cannabis extracts. It has also shown anti-epileptiform and anticonvulsant properties, that suggest possible therapeutic application in the treatment of pathophysiologic hyperexcitability states such as untreatable epilepsy.

THCV is found to inhibit the activity of both fatty acid amide hydrolase (FAAH) and monoacyl glycerol lipase (MGL), even at micromolar concentrations, and thereby able to inhibit the hydrolysis of the endocannabinoids anandamide (AEA: C_{22}H_{37}NO_{2}; 20:4, ω-6) besides other N-acylethanolamines and 2-Arachidonoylglycerol (2-AG: C_{23}H_{38}O_{4}; 20:4, ω-6), respectively, therefore, it can also act as an indirect agonist at the cannabinoid receptors, by enhancing the activity of the endocannabinoid system (ECS).

== Chemistry ==
Similar to THC, THCV has 7 possible double bond isomers and 30 stereoisomers (see: Tetrahydrocannabinol#Isomerism). The alternative isomer Δ^{8}-THCV is known as a synthetic compound with a code number of O-4395, but it is not known to have been isolated from Cannabis plant material.

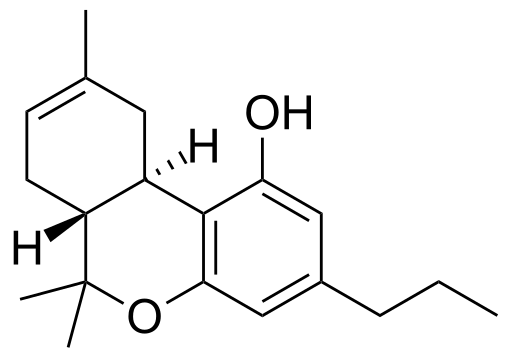
The chemical structure of (Δ^{8}-THCV), a synthetic analog of THCV. Other names include O-4395, CAS 31262-38-1

=== Synthesis ===
Unlike THC, cannabidiol (CBD), and cannabichromene (CBC), THCV doesn't begin as cannabigerolic acid (CBGA). Instead of combining with olivetolic acid to create CBGA, geranyl pyrophosphate joins with divarinolic acid, which has two fewer carbon atoms. The result is cannabigerovarin acid (CBGVA). Once CBGVA is created, the process continues exactly the same as it would for THC. CBGVA is broken down to tetrahydrocannabivarin carboxylic acid (THCVA) by the enzyme THCV synthase. At that point, THCVA can be decarboxylated with heat or UV light to create THCV.

== Natural occurrence ==
Plants with elevated levels of propyl cannabinoids (including THCV) have been found in populations of Cannabis sativa L. ssp. indica (= Cannabis indica Lam.) from China, India, Nepal, Thailand, Afghanistan, and Pakistan, as well as southern and western Africa. THCV levels up to 20% of total cannabinoids have been reported.

== Research ==
=== Reducing blood sugar ===
THCV is a new potential treatment against obesity-associated glucose intolerance with pharmacology different from that of CB1 inverse agonists/antagonists. GW Pharmaceuticals is studying plant-derived tetrahydrocannabivarin (as GWP42004) for type 2 diabetes in addition to metformin.

=== Appetite control ===
THC increases appetite, which is sometimes referred to as "the munchies". THC acts as a CB1 agonist. As a CB1 antagonist, THCV has been shown to reduce appetite in murine models.

=== Energy and motivation ===
A 2:1 ratio of naturally derived THCV to THC extract has been demonstrated to show energizing and motivating effects in a double blind placebo clinical study which relied on a self-reported user survey for results.

== Society and culture ==
=== Legal status ===
It is not scheduled by Convention on Psychotropic Substances.

==== United States ====
THCV is not scheduled at the federal level so long as it is not derived from cannabis varieties that produce more than .3% THC on a dry weight basis in the United States.

The 2018 United States farm bill legalized the production and sale of THCV if it is derived from hemp compliant with the farm bill.

== See also ==
- Cannabinoid
- Cannabis
- Cannabivarin (CBV)
- Cannabidivarin (CBDV)
- Federal Analogue Act
- Hexahydrocannabivarin
- Medical cannabis
- Parahexyl
- Rimonabant (synthetic CB_{1} antagonist)
- Tetrahydrocannabiorcol (Δ^{9}-THCC, (C1)-Δ^{9}-THC)
- Tetrahydrocannabutol (Δ^{9}-THCB, (C4)-Δ^{9}-THC)
- Tetrahydrocannabihexol (Δ^{9}-THCH, (C6)-Δ^{9}-THC)
- Tetrahydrocannabiphorol (Δ^{9}-THCP, (C7)-Δ^{9}-THC)
