= 10-Hydroxy-HHCP =

Identifiers
- IUPAC name: (6aR,10R,10aR)-6,6,9-trimethyl-3-heptyl-6a,7,10,10a-hexhydro-6H-dibenzo[b,d]pyran-1,10-diol
- PubChem CID: 172872054
- ChemSpider: 129767671

Chemical and physical data
- Formula: C_{23}H_{36}O_{3}
- Molar mass: 360.538 g·mol^{−1}
- 3D model (JSmol): Interactive image
- SMILES: CC1(C)Oc2cc(cc(O)c2[C@@H]2[C@@H](O)C(C)CC[C@H]21)CCCCCCC
- InChI: InChI=1S/C23H36O3/c1-5-6-7-8-9-10-16-13-18(24)21-19(14-16)26-23(3,4)17-12-11-15(2)22(25)20(17)21/h13-15,17,20,22,24-25H,5-12H2,1-4H3/t15-,17-,20-,22+/m1/s1; Key:SSVKYSSTQAHKGU-HHRWBCNNSA-N

10-Hydroxy-HHCP (10-Hydroxy-hexahydrocannabiphorol) is a semi-synthetic cannabinoid which has been sold as a designer drug, first identified in Germany in December 2024.

== See also ==
- 10-Hydroxy-THC
- 10-Hydroxy-HHC
- Hexahydrocannabiphorol
- Tetrahydrocannabiphorol
