= Cannabis in Northern Cyprus =

- Location of Northern Cyprus (dark green)
- Medicinal: Legal
- Recreational: Illegal

Cannabis in Northern Cyprus is illegal for recreational use but legal for medical purposes under certain conditions. Marijuana is the most commonly used illicit drug by Turkish Cypriots.

== Medical cannabis ==
The government officially legalized medical use of cannabis oil for cancer patients on January 7, 2017. Republic of Cyprus, which Northern Cyprus de jure a part of, has also legalized medical cannabis production later that year, though the use of medical cannabis has only been legalized in early 2019 by House of Representatives of Cyprus. In May 2020 National Unity Party of Northern Cyprus MP Oğuzhan Hasipoğlu expressed that production of medical cannabis "soon could be discussed in the parliament.". He has claimed that medical cannabis production could help patients with pain issues and would also be beneficial to country's economy.

== Prevalence ==
In a 2020 study that examined lifetime prevalence of drug use in Northern Cyprus between 2003 and 2015 it was found that 4.5% of the questioned has used cannabis at least once in their lives. The prevalence of the use of synthetic cannabinoids were 3.5%. Studies on drug use among Turkish Cypriots have shown similarities to both Turks in Turkey, as well as to Greek Cypriots. Another study from 2013 discovered that lifetime prevalence of cannabis use was 7.7% in TRNC. It is believed that the prevalence of cannabis consumption is growing in the country.

== Legalization efforts ==
The first 420 event in the country was held in the capital city of Lefkoşa in 2015. On April 20, 2017, a small group of protesters carried out an event near the parliament building and made a public statement, demanding the legalization of cannabis sale, consumption, and production within state regulations.

== See also ==
- Cannabis in Cyprus
