= AM-11245 =

Chemical compound

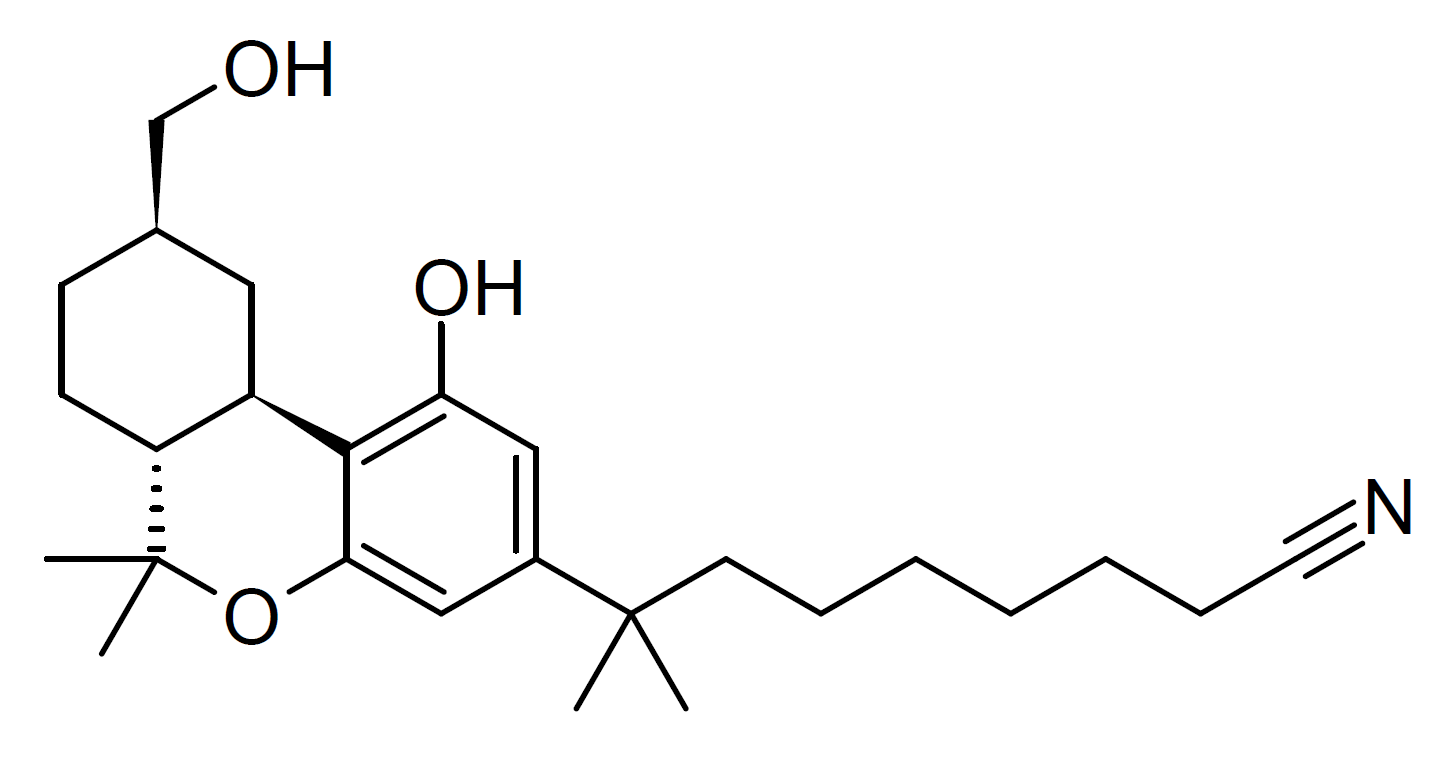

Identifiers
- IUPAC name: 8-[(6aR,9R,10aR)-1-hydroxy-9-(hydroxymethyl)-6,6-dimethyl-6a,7,8,9,10,10a-hexahydro-6H-benzo[c]chromen-3-yl]-8-methylnonanenitrile
- CAS Number: 2762979-76-8
- PubChem CID: 166636133
- ChemSpider: 129302120
- UNII: S9N8MJ7QNL
- ChEMBL: ChEMBL5091754

Chemical and physical data
- Formula: C_{26}H_{39}NO_{3}
- Molar mass: 413.602 g·mol^{−1}
- 3D model (JSmol): Interactive image
- SMILES: CC1(C)OC2=C([C@H]3[C@H]1CC[C@@H](CO)C3)C(O)=CC(C(C)(C)CCCCCCC#N)=C2
- InChI: InChI=1S/C26H39NO3/c1-25(2,12-8-6-5-7-9-13-27)19-15-22(29)24-20-14-18(17-28)10-11-21(20)26(3,4)30-23(24)16-19/h15-16,18,20-21,28-29H,5-12,14,17H2,1-4H3/t18-,20-,21-/m1/s1; Key:IGSAQGJQMKOTAG-HMXCVIKNSA-N

AM-11245 is a drug which is a cannabinoid agonist from the classical cannabinoid family. It has high affinity and efficacy at both the CB_{1} and CB_{2} cannabinoid receptors, with a K_{i} of 0.4nM at both CB_{1} and CB_{2}, and an EC_{50} of ~0.06nM at CB_{1} and 0.2nM at CB_{2}, making it one of the most potent cannabinoid agonists identified to date.

== See also ==
- HU-243
- O-774
- List of AM cannabinoids
