= Hydroxypregnenolone =

Hydroxypregnenolone may refer to:

- 17α-Hydroxypregnenolone
- 21-Hydroxypregnenolone

== See also ==
- Hydroxyprogesterone
