= Canbisol =

Synthetic cannabinoid derivative drug

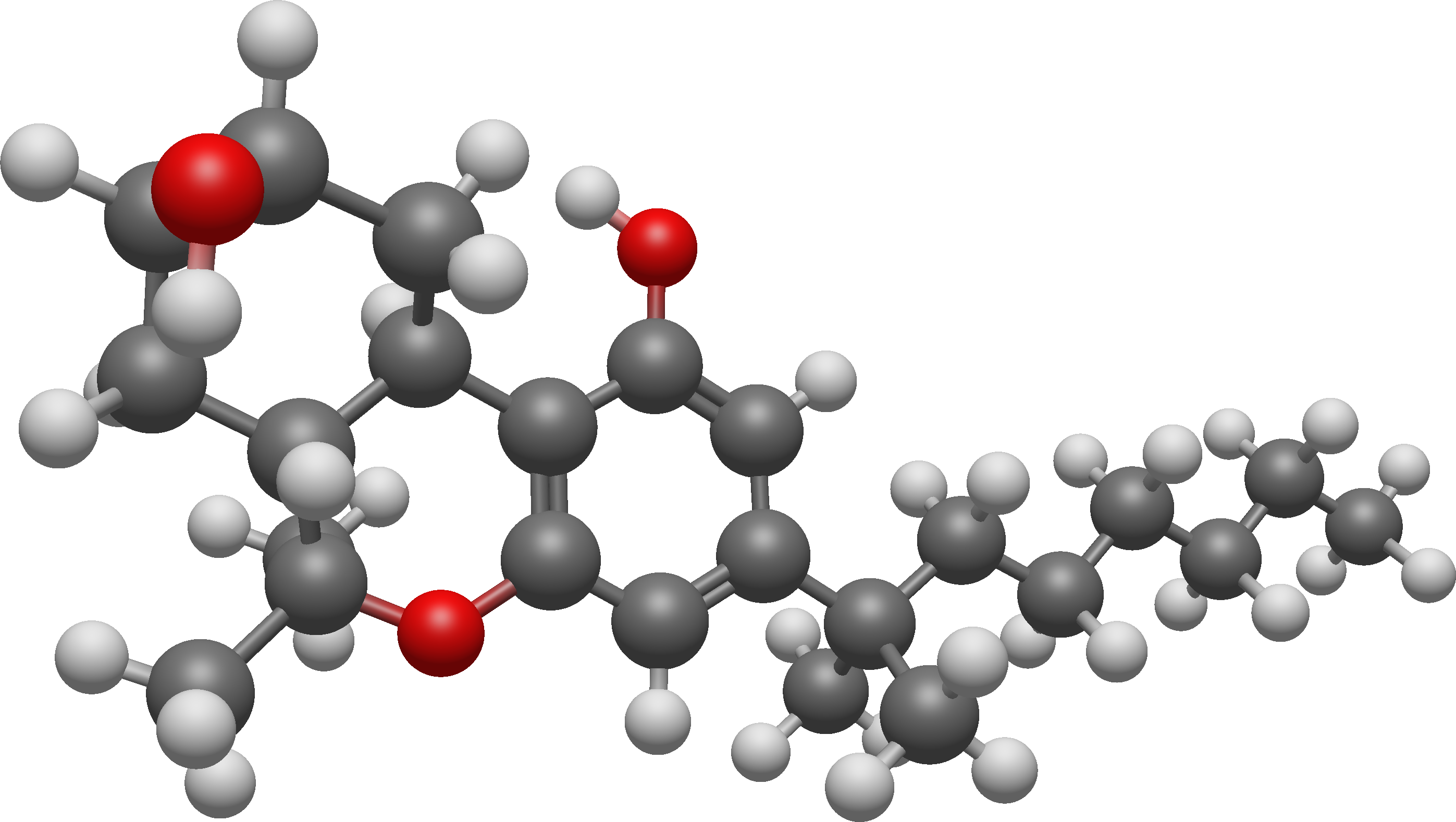

Clinical data
- Drug class: Cannabinoid
- ATC code: none

Identifiers
- IUPAC name: (6aR,9R,10aR)-6,6-dimethyl-3-(2-methyloctan-2-yl)-6a,7,8,9,10,10a-hexahydrobenzo[c]chromene-1,9-diol
- CAS Number: 56689-43-1
- PubChem CID: 41969
- ChemSpider: 16736847
- UNII: NZ1ZPC4WSF
- ChEMBL: ChEMBL2105525
- CompTox Dashboard (EPA): DTXSID00866582

Chemical and physical data
- Formula: C_{24}H_{38}O_{3}
- Molar mass: 374.565 g·mol^{−1}
- 3D model (JSmol): Interactive image
- SMILES: Oc1cc(C(C)(C)CCCCCC)cc(c1C2C3)OC(C)(C)C2CCC3O
- InChI: InChI=1S/C24H38O3/c1-6-7-8-9-12-23(2,3)16-13-20(26)22-18-15-17(25)10-11-19(18)24(4,5)27-21(22)14-16/h13-14,17-19,25-26H,6-12,15H2,1-5H3/t17?,18-,19-/m0/s1; Key:UEKGZFCGRQYMRM-MNNMKWMVSA-N

Canbisol (Nabidrox) is a synthetic cannabinoid derivative that is the dimethylheptyl homologue of 9-nor-9β-hydroxyhexahydrocannabinol (HHC). It is a potent agonist at both the CB_{1} and CB_{2} receptors, with a binding affinity of 0.1 nM at CB_{1} and 0.2 nM at CB_{2}. It is mainly used in scientific research, in receptor binding studies to determine the structure and function of the cannabinoid receptors, but has been made illegal in some countries due to its possible abuse potential as a cannabinomimetic drug.

== See also ==
- CP 42,096
- HU-210
- HU-243
- Nabilone
