= THCP-O-acetate =

Chemical compound

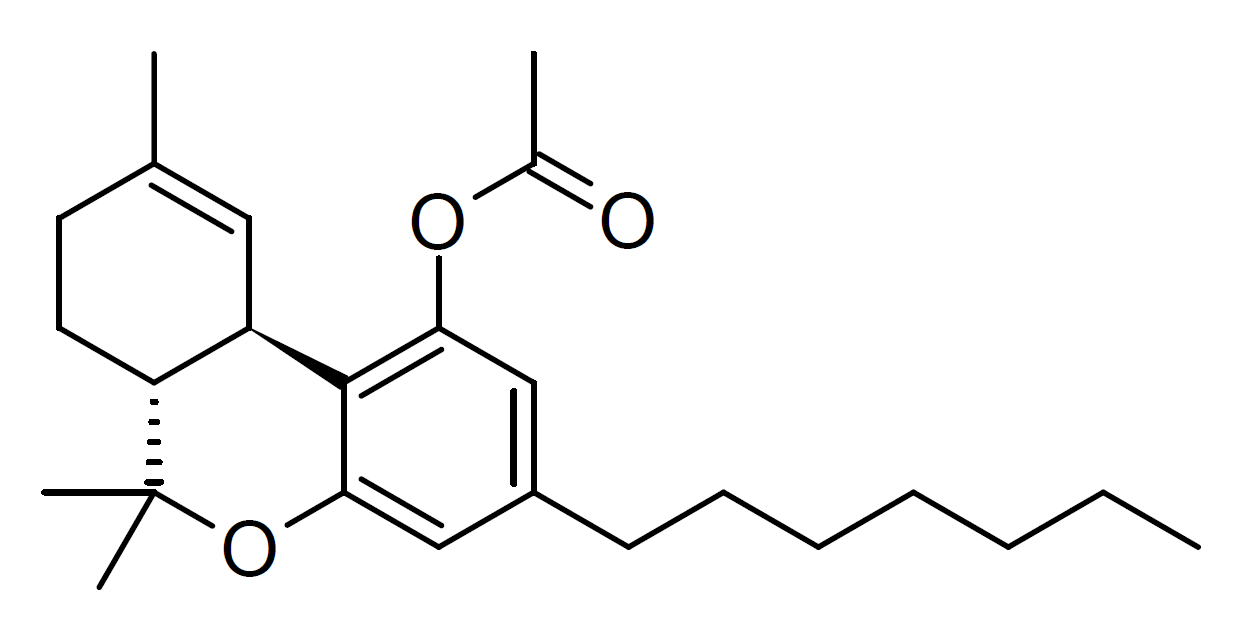

Identifiers
- IUPAC name: (6aR,10aR)-3-heptyl-6,6,9-trimethyl-6a,7,8,10a-tetrahydrobenzo[c]chromen-1-yl acetate
- CAS Number: 2829292-82-0
- ChemSpider: 129341098

Chemical and physical data
- Formula: C_{25}H_{36}O_{3}
- Molar mass: 384.560 g·mol^{−1}
- 3D model (JSmol): Interactive image
- SMILES: CC(=O)Oc1cc(CCCCCCC)cc2OC(C)(C)[C@@H]3CCC(C)=C[C@H]3c21
- InChI: InChI=1S/C25H36O3/c1-6-7-8-9-10-11-19-15-22(27-18(3)26)24-20-14-17(2)12-13-21(20)25(4,5)28-23(24)16-19/h14-16,20-21H,6-13H2,1-5H3/t20-,21-/m1/s1; Key:OXMUZNKOOOITQD-NHCUHLMSSA-N

THCP-O-acetate (THCP-O) is a semi-synthetic derivative of tetrahydrocannabiphorol (THCP) derived by the O-acetylation of THCP with acetic anhydride. It has been found as a component of grey-market cannabis products and is allegedly a potent and long-lasting psychoactive cannabinoid.

== Toxicity ==
In 2022, researchers at Portland State University reported that Vitamin E acetate, CBD-acetate, CBN-acetate and THC-O-acetate may break down to release ketene gas when heated at 340 °C (644 °F).

== Legality ==
Japan banned THCP-O-Acetate along with HHCP on December 26, 2023.

== See also ==
- Tetrahydrocannabiphorol
- Hexahydrocannabiphorol (HHCP)
- HHCP-O-acetate
- THC-O-acetate
- Dimethylheptylpyran (DMHP)
- HU-210
- THC-O-phosphate
- THC hemisuccinate
- THC morpholinylbutyrate
- Edgewood Arsenal human experiments
