= Hexahydrocannabiphorol =

Semi-sythetic cannabinoid drug

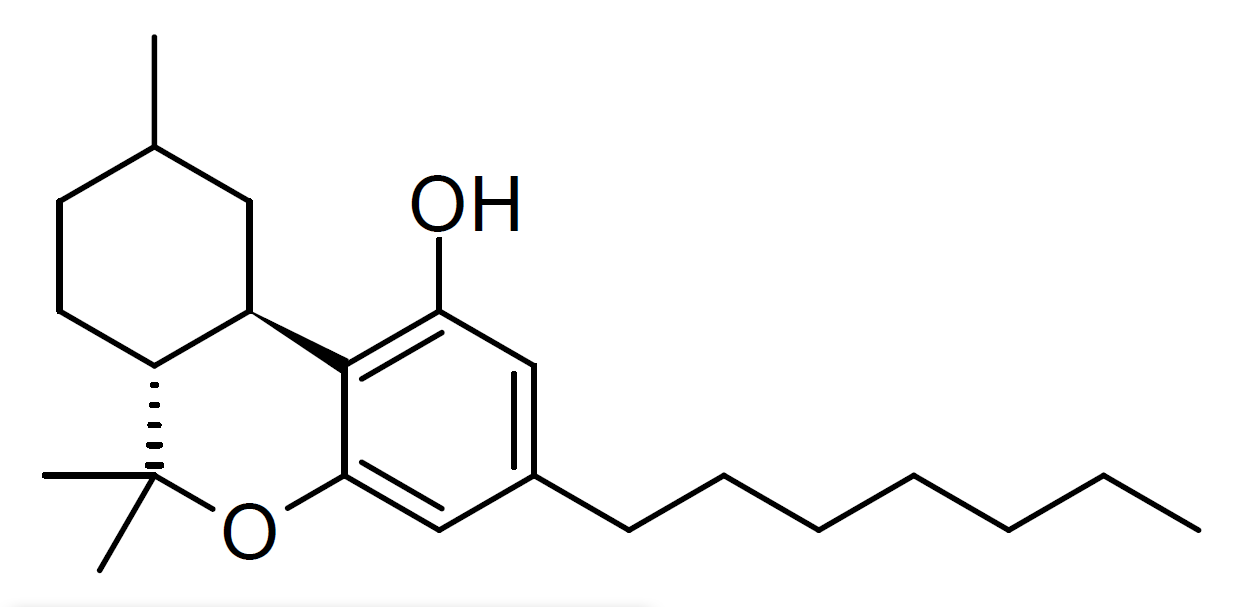

Identifiers
- IUPAC name: (6aR,10aR)-6,6,9-trimethyl-3-heptyl-6a,7,8,9,10,10a-hexahydrobenzo[c]chromen-1-ol
- CAS Number: 3051970-87-4

Chemical and physical data
- Formula: C_{23}H_{36}O_{2}
- Molar mass: 344.539 g·mol^{−1}
- 3D model (JSmol): Interactive image
- SMILES: CCCCCCCc1cc2OC(C)(C)[C@@H]3CCC(C)C[C@H]3c2c(O)c1
- InChI: InChI=InChI=1S/C23H36O2/c1-5-6-7-8-9-10-17-14-20(24)22-18-13-16(2)11-12-19(18)23(3,4)25-21(22)15-17/h14-16,18-19,24H,5-13H2,1-4H3/t16?,18-,19-/m1/s1; Key:USZILQYXSONCHH-VOBHOPKGSA-N

Commonly misspelled as 'hexahydroxycannabiphorol'

Hexahydrocannabiphorol (HHCP) is a semi-synthetic cannabinoid derivative which has been marketed since around 2021. It is believed to be made from the hydrogenation of tetrahydrocannabiphorol (THCP). THCP is only reported as a trace component of cannabis in 2019. HHCP was studied by Roger Adams as early as 1942.

== Pharmacology ==
HHC-P is a partial agonist of the CB1 receptors with an EC50 of 44.4nM for 9R-HHCP and 134nM for 9S-HHCP. Compared to Hexahydrocannabinol (HHC) with an EC50 of 101nM for 9R-HHC and 1,190nM for 9S-HHC. In 2021, HHC-P was positively identified in multiple gray market cannabis products in the United States.

== Legality ==
The legal status of hexahydrocannabinol and derivatives varies between countries, leading to widespread sale in some parts of Europe and the US.

In France, HHCP was banned in 2023.

In Japan, Japanese Health Ministry announced that six synthetic cannabinoids with structures similar to HHCH, including HHCP, were to be banned from 6 January 2024.

HHCP was banned in Slovakia as of 13 January 2024.

== See also ==
- Tetrahydrocannabinol
- Tetrahydrocannabiphorol
- Nabilone
- Hexahydrocannabinol
- Canbisol
- CP 42,096
- HHC-acetate
- Hexahydrocannabihexol
- HHCP-O-acetate
- THCP-O-acetate
