= 9-Hydroxyhexahydrocannabinol =

Synthetic cannabinoid

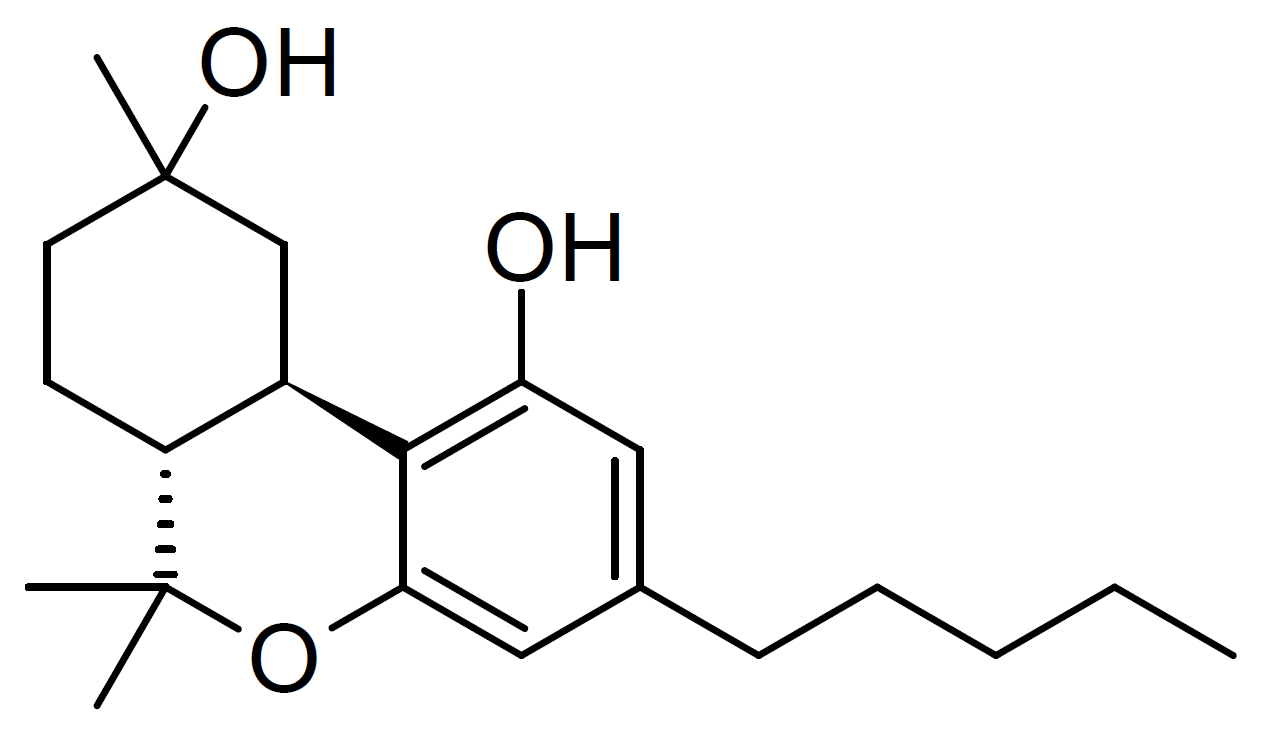

Identifiers
- IUPAC name: (6aR,10aR)-6,6,9-trimethyl-3-pentyl-7,8,10,10a-tetrahydro-6aH-benzo[c]chromene-1,9-diol
- CAS Number: 36028-45-2 52522-56-2
- PubChem CID: 71579182
- ChemSpider: 148443

Chemical and physical data
- Formula: C_{21}H_{32}O_{3}
- Molar mass: 332.484 g·mol^{−1}
- 3D model (JSmol): Interactive image
- SMILES: CCCCCC1=CC(=C2C3CC(CCC3C(OC2=C1)(C)C)(C)O)O
- InChI: InChI=1S/C21H32O3/c1-5-6-7-8-14-11-17(22)19-15-13-21(4,23)10-9-16(15)20(2,3)24-18(19)12-14/h11-12,15-16,22-23H,5-10,13H2,1-4H3/t15-,16-,21?/m1/s1; Key:KSGRDIFQZVURIF-BLRYKZMTSA-N

9-Hydroxyhexahydrocannabinol (9-OH-HHC) is a semi-synthetic derivative of tetrahydrocannabinol. It is formed as an impurity in the synthesis of Delta-8-THC, and retains activity in animal studies though with only around 1/10 the potency of Δ^{9}-THC, with the 9α- and 9β- enantiomers having around the same potency.

== See also ==
- 8-Hydroxyhexahydrocannabinol
- 9-Nor-9β-hydroxyhexahydrocannabinol
- 10-Hydroxyhexahydrocannabinol
- 11-Hydroxyhexahydrocannabinol
- 11-Hydroxy-THC
- 11-Hydroxy-Delta-8-THC
- Cannabicitran
- Cannabitriol
- Delta-10-THC
- Hexahydrocannabinol
