= HU-243 =

Chemical compound with similarities to canbisol

Identifiers
- IUPAC name: (6aR,8S,9S,10aR)-9-(hydroxymethyl)-6,6-dimethyl-3-(2-methyloctan-2-yl)-8,9-ditritio-7,8,10,10a-tetrahydro-6aH-benzo[c]chromen-1-ol
- CAS Number: 140835-18-3
- PubChem CID: 3081854
- IUPHAR/BPS: 735
- ChemSpider: 2339369
- UNII: SKGOA1RZCT
- CompTox Dashboard (EPA): DTXSID30161476

Chemical and physical data
- Formula: C_{25}H_{40}O_{3}
- Molar mass: 388.592 g·mol^{−1}
- 3D model (JSmol): Interactive image
- SMILES: CC(O1)(C)[C@H]2[C@@H](C[C@H](CO)CC2)C3=C1C=C(C(C)(C)CCCCCC)C=C3O
- InChI: InChI=1S/C25H40O3/c1-6-7-8-9-12-24(2,3)18-14-21(27)23-19-13-17(16-26)10-11-20(19)25(4,5)28-22(23)15-18/h14-15,17,19-20,26-27H,6-13,16H2,1-5H3/t17-,19-,20-/m1/s1/i10T,17T/t10-,17+,19+,20+/m0; Key:MVEVPDCVOXJVBD-FASICABJSA-N

HU-243 (AM-4056) is a synthetic cannabinoid drug that is a single enantiomer of the hydrogenated derivative of the commonly used reference agonist HU-210. It is a methylene homologue of canbisol. It is a potent agonist at both the CB_{1} and CB_{2} receptors, with a binding affinity of 0.041 nM at the CB_{1} receptor, making it marginally more potent than HU-210, which had an affinity of 0.061 nM in the same assay.

== Legal status ==
HU-243 is not listed in the schedules set out by the United Nations Single Convention on Narcotic Drugs from 1961 nor the Convention on Psychotropic Substances from 1971, so the signatory countries to these international drug control treaties are not required by said treaties to control HU-243.

=== United States ===
HU-243 is not listed in the list of scheduled controlled substances in the United States. It is therefore not scheduled at the federal level in the United States, but it is possible that HU-243 could legally be considered an analog of THC (which is one of the substances controlled in Schedule I as "tetrahydrocannabinols") or another synthetic Schedule I cannabinoids such as CP-47,497, and therefore sales or possession could potentially be prosecuted under the Federal Analogue Act.

==== Florida ====
HU-243 is a Schedule I controlled substance, categorized as a hallucinogen, making it illegal to buy, sell, or possess in the state of Florida without a license.

(c) Unless specifically excepted or unless listed in another schedule, any material, compound, mixture, or preparation that contains any quantity of the following hallucinogenic substances or that contains any of their salts, isomers, including optical, positional, or geometric isomers, homologues, nitrogen-heterocyclic analogs, esters, ethers, and salts of isomers, homologues, nitrogen-heterocyclic analogs, esters, or ethers, if the existence of such salts, isomers, and salts of isomers is possible within the specific chemical designation or class description:

...

185. HU-243 ((6aR,8S,9S,10aR)-9-(Hydroxymethyl)-6,6-dimethyl-3-(2-methyloctan-2-yl)-8,9-ditritio-7,8,10,10a-tetrahydro-6aH-benzo[c]chromen-1-ol).

==== Vermont ====
Effective January 1, 2016, HU-243 is probably (a little doubt arises due to apparent mistaken naming) a regulated drug in Vermont designated as a "Hallucinogenic Drug."

“Hallucinogenic Drug” means those specified in Section 7 of this rule including stramonium, mescaline or peyote, lysergic acid diethylamide, and psilocybin, and all synthetic equivalents of chemicals contained in resinous extractives of Cannabis sativa, or any salts or derivatives or compounds of any preparations or mixtures thereof, and any other substance having a hallucinogenic effect in the regulations adopted by the Board of Health under 18 V.S.A.§ 4202.

...

• Cannabimimetic Agents means, collectively, any chemical that is a cannabinoid receptor type 1 (CB1) or cannabinoid receptor type 2 (CB2) agonist, or any salts, isomers, derivatives, or analogs of these chemicals. Structural classes include but are not limited to:

(a) 2-(3-hydroxycyclohexyl)phenol with substitution at the 5-position of the phenolic ring by alkyl or alkenyl, whether or not substituted on the cyclohexyl ring to any extent.

(b) 3-(1-naphthoyl)indole or 3-(1-naphthyl)indole with substitution at the nitrogen atom of the indole ring, whether or not further substituted on the indole ring to any extent, whether or not substituted on the naphthoyl or naphthyl ring to any extent.

(c) 3-(1-naphthoyl)pyrrole with substitution at the nitrogen atom of the pyrrole ring, whether or not further substituted in the pyrrole ring to any extent, whether or not substituted on the naphthoyl ring to any extent.

(d) 1-(1-naphthylmethyl)indene with substitution of the 3-position of the indene ring, whether or not further substituted in the indene ring to any extent, whether or not substituted on the naphthyl ring to any extent.

(e) 3-phenylacetylindole or 3-benzoylindole with substitution at the nitrogen atom of the indole ring, whether or not further substituted in the indole ring to any extent, whether or not substituted on the phenyl ring to any extent.

(f) indole- (2,2,3,3-tetramethylcyclopropyl)methanone, with substitution at the nitrogen atom of the indole ring, whether or not further substituted in the indole ring to any extent, whether or not substituted on the phenyl ring to any extent.

(g) N- adamantyl-indole-3-carboxamide, with substitution at the nitrogen atom of the indole ring, whether or not further substituted in the indole ring to any extent, whether or not substituted on the phenyl ring to any extent.

(h) (1,3-thiazol-2- ylidine)-2,2,3,3- tetramethylcyclopropane-1-carboxamide, with substitution to any extent at any position of the thiazolylidine ring.

...

• HU-243; 3-dimethylheptyl-11-hydroxyhexahydrocannabinol; canbisol, nabidrox

The above chemical name ("3-dimethylheptyl-11-hydroxyhexahydrocannabinol") and common ("canbisol") or trade names ("nabidrox") are not the same chemical as HU-243. They identify canbisol, of which HU-243 is a methylene homologue.

== See also ==
- 11-OH-HHC
- AM-2389
- AM-11245
- Nabilone
