= Hexahydrocannabinol =

Hydrogenated derivative of THC

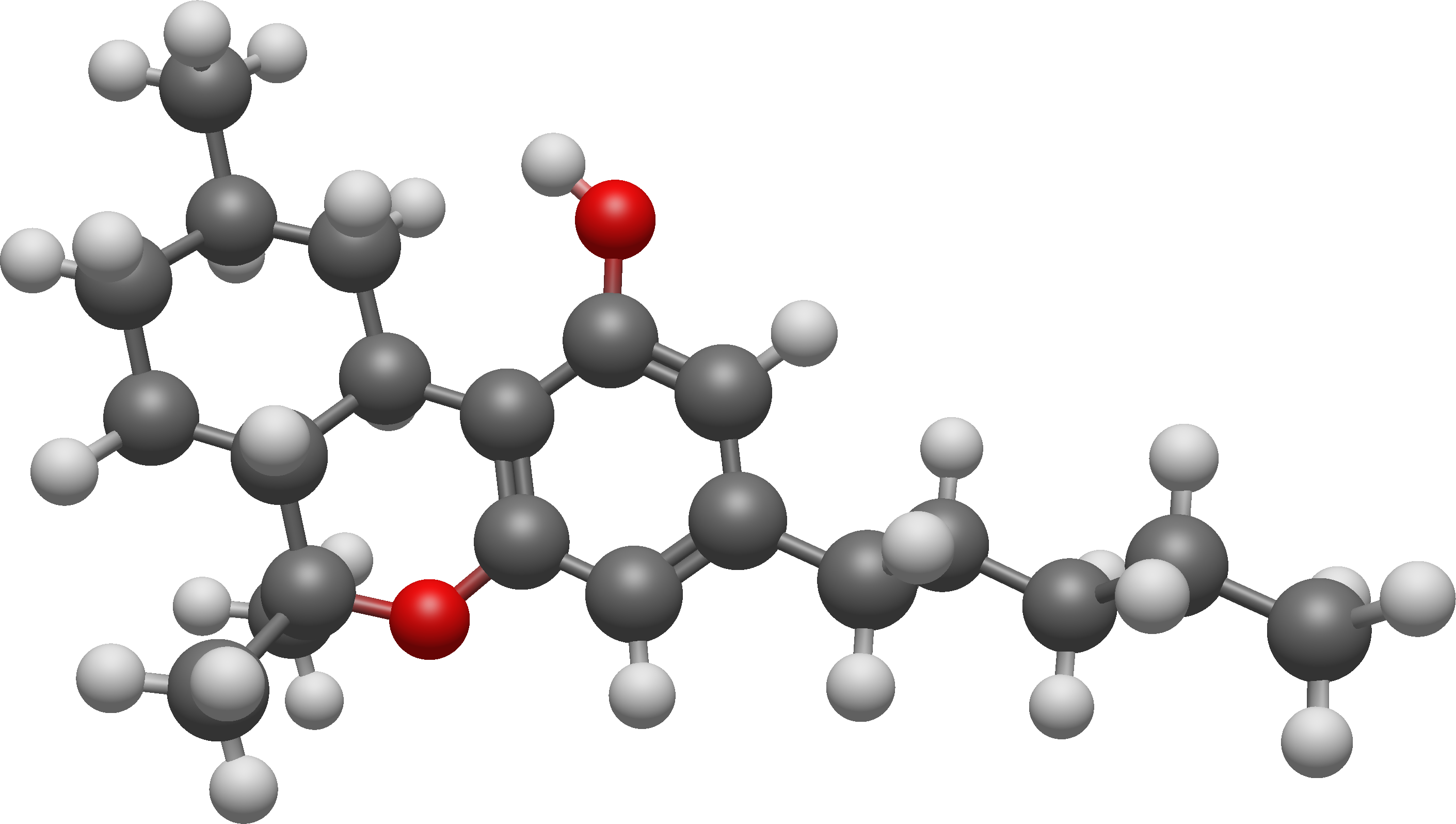

Clinical data
- ATC code: None

Legal status
- Legal status: UK: Illegal to produce, supply, or sell under the Psychoactive Substances Act 2016; US: Currently under litigation; UN: Unscheduled; SE: Förteckning I

Identifiers
- IUPAC name: (6aR,10aR)-6,6,9-trimethyl-3-pentyl-6a,7,8,9,10,10a-hexahydrobenzo[c]chromen-1-ol
- CAS Number: 6692-85-9 946512-74-9 (6aR,10aR) (unspecified stereochemistry)
- PubChem CID: 16050328
- ChemSpider: 13178711
- CompTox Dashboard (EPA): DTXSID20985587

Chemical and physical data
- Formula: C_{21}H_{32}O_{2}
- Molar mass: 316.485 g·mol^{−1}
- 3D model (JSmol): Interactive image
- SMILES: CCCCCC1=CC(=C2[C@@H]3CC(CC[C@H]3C(OC2=C1)(C)C)C)O
- InChI: InChI=1S/C21H32O2/c1-5-6-7-8-15-12-18(22)20-16-11-14(2)9-10-17(16)21(3,4)23-19(20)13-15/h12-14,16-17,22H,5-11H2,1-4H3/t14?,16-,17-/m1/s1; Key:XKRHRBJLCLXSGE-VNCLPFQGSA-N

Hexahydrocannabinol (HHC) is a phytocannabinoid that has been reported as a minor component of Cannabis oleoresin. It can also be synthesized by hydrogenation of a mixture of various tetrahydrocannabinol (THC) isomers, usually derived from hemp CBD isolate.

The synthesis and bioactivity of HHC was first reported in 1940 by Roger Adams.

HHC is a psychoactive substance with effects reportedly similar to those of THC. HHC vaporizers have been openly sold at head shops and convenience stores since at least the early 2020s in North America and Europe. While HHC has never been approved by any drug regulatory agency, a racemic mixture of epimers has shown in vitro activity against pancreatic ductal adenocarcinoma cell lines.

== Pharmacology ==
HHC has 2 diastereomers that only differ by the orientation of the 9-methyl group, unlike D9-THC and D8-THC which have the double bond position next to the 9-methyl group that prevents this. The 9-methyl group and its chiral orientation are believed to be important for cannabinoid receptor binding.

Binding Affinities (K_{i})
Site	9R-HHC	9S-HHC	delta-9-THC
CB_{1}	15nM ± 0.8nM	176nM ± 3.3nM	15nM ± 4.4nM
CB_{2}	13nM ± 0.4nM	105nM ± 26nM	9.1nM ± 3.6nM
Selectivity for CB_{2}	1.2x	1.7x	1.6x
Values are K_{i} (nM), unless otherwise noted. The smaller the value, the more strongly the drug binds to the site.

Potency (EC50)
Site	9R-HHC	9S-HHC	delta-9-THC
CB_{1}	3.4nM ± 1.5nM	57nM ± 19nM	3.9nM ± 0.5nM
CB_{2}	6.2nM ± 2.1nM	55nM ± 10nM	2.5nM ± 0.7nM
Selectivity for CB_{2}	0.55x	1.0x	1.6x
Values are EC50 (nM), unless otherwise noted. The smaller the value, the more potent the drug is.

HHC has been typically described as weaker than delta-9-THC in psychoactive effects. HHC produces 11-hydroxyhexahydrocannabinol and 8-hydroxyhexahydrocannabinol among others as a metabolite which may contribute to overall psychoactivity.

== Chemistry ==
Several research groups have successfully synthesized (+)-HHC and (-)-HHC using citronellal and olivetol, as well as other related compounds. While similar compounds have previously been identified in cannabis, hexahydrocannabinol itself has rarely been isolated from the plant. The de Las Heras group in 2020 took lipid extract from Cannabis sativa seeds and discovered 43 cannabinoids in the crude extract; one of them being hexahydrocannabinol. It has two diastereomers at the methyl (9) position. HHC is typically made from hydrogenation of THC. There are no double bonds in the cyclohexyl ring like D8/D9 have—they have been removed from the structure and hydrogens have been added to the compound.

Several structurally related HHC analogs have been found to be naturally occurring in Cannabis including cannabiripsol, 9α-hydroxyhexahydrocannabinol, 7-oxo-9α-hydroxyhexa-hydrocannabinol, 10α-hydroxyhexahydrocannabinol, 10aR-hydroxyhexahydrocannabinol and 1′S-hydroxycannabinol, 10α-hydroxy-Δ(9,11)-hexahydrocannabinol and 9β,10β-epoxyhexahydrocannabinol.

HHC itself has been found as a degradation byproduct of THC in a similar way that cannabinol and delta-8-THC can be formed by the Cannabis plant from delta-9-THC degradation. The degradation of D9-THC that forms HHC is the reduction of the double carbon bonds that would typically make up the delta isomer position on THCs structure.

Delta-9-THC was discovered to partly metabolize into 11-hydroxy-THC and alpha,10 alpha-epoxy-hexahydrocannabinol along with 1,2-epoxy-hexahydrocannabinol. Cannabidiol was discovered to partly metabolize into 9α-hydroxy-HHC and 8-hydroxy-iso-HHC inside the body. In the presence of alcohol, the methoxy or ethoxy analogs such as 9-methoxy-HHC, 10-methoxy-HHC, 9-ethoxy-HHC and 10-ethoxy-HHC can be formed.

Hexahydrocannabinol should not be confused with the related compounds 9-Nor-9β-hydroxyhexahydrocannabinol (9-Nor-9Beta-HHC) or 9-hydroxyhexahydrocannabinol (9-OH-HHC) or 11-hydroxyhexahydrocannabinol (11-OH-HHC and 7-OH-HHC), all of which have also sometimes been referred to as "HHC".

== Legality ==
In the United Kingdom, HHC is not scheduled under the Misuse of Drugs Act 1971 but is regarded as a psychoactive substance and therefore illegal to produce, supply, or sell under the Psychoactive Substances Act 2016.

In Ireland, HHC was classified as an illegal drug by the Government on 29 July 2025. This was on the advice of the Health Service Executive of Ireland, which stated that "since it (HHC) was first detected in Ireland in 2022, it has been linked with episodes of psychosis and hospitalisation".

In Austria, HHC has been banned since 23 March 2023 due to the amendment of the New Psychoactive Substances Ordinance (known in German as Neue-Psychoaktive-Substanzen-Verordnung or NPSV).

In France, the ANSM announced the ban on production, sale and use of HHC and two of its derivatives, HHCO and HHCP, from 13 June 2023.

HHC has been banned in Sweden since 11 July 2023, and in Italy since 28 July 2023.

In Luxembourg, Ministry of Health announced on 1 August 2023 that HHC would be regulated in that country by extending its list of psychotropic substances from 2009 to all "synthetic cannabinoid receptor agonists" and "synthetic cannabinomimetics [sic]", with semi-synthetic cannabinoids such as HHC falling within the scope of that regulation.

HHC has been banned in Lithuania since 23 November 2022, and in Slovenia since 15 November 2023.

HHC has been banned in the Czech Republic since 6 March 2024.

In Germany, manufacture and sale of products containing HHC and other synthetically produced cannabinoids, such as THCP and HHCP, became outlawed on 27 June 2024 (possession and consumption of those products while illegal, is not punishable). Previously, the German expert committee for narcotics had suggested that HHC be added to the annex of Novel Psychoactive Substances Act (NpSG) in a meeting on 4 December 2023. This recommendation was enacted by the Bundesrat on 14 June 2024, and was published in the Bundesgesetzblatt on 26 June.

In Russia, Deputy of the Moscow City Duma Darya Besedina sent a request on 1 March 2024 to the Russian Ministry of Internal Affairs to clarify the legal status of HHC, HHCP and THCP in Russia. According to the answer from the Ministry that Besedina published, HHC and HHCP are not prohibited substances in Russia, but THCP is.

In Malta, Parliamentary Secretary of Reforms and Equality Rebecca Buttigieg announced on 27 September 2024 that "all HHC products will be banned from Maltese markets."

HHC has been banned in Poland as of 14 April 2023.

== See also ==
- 8-Hydroxyhexahydrocannabinol
- 11-Hydroxyhexahydrocannabinol
- 7,8-Dihydrocannabinol
- Cannabinol
- 9-Nor-9β-hydroxyhexahydrocannabinol
- 9-Hydroxyhexahydrocannabinol
- H4-CBD
- Hexahydrocannabihexol
- HU-243
- Canbisol
- Delta-8-THC
- Delta-10-THC
- Delta-11-THC
- Tetrahydrocannabiphorol
- THC-O-acetate
- Delta-6-Cannabidiol
