= Hexahydrocannabihexol =

Semi-synthetic cannabinoid derivative drug

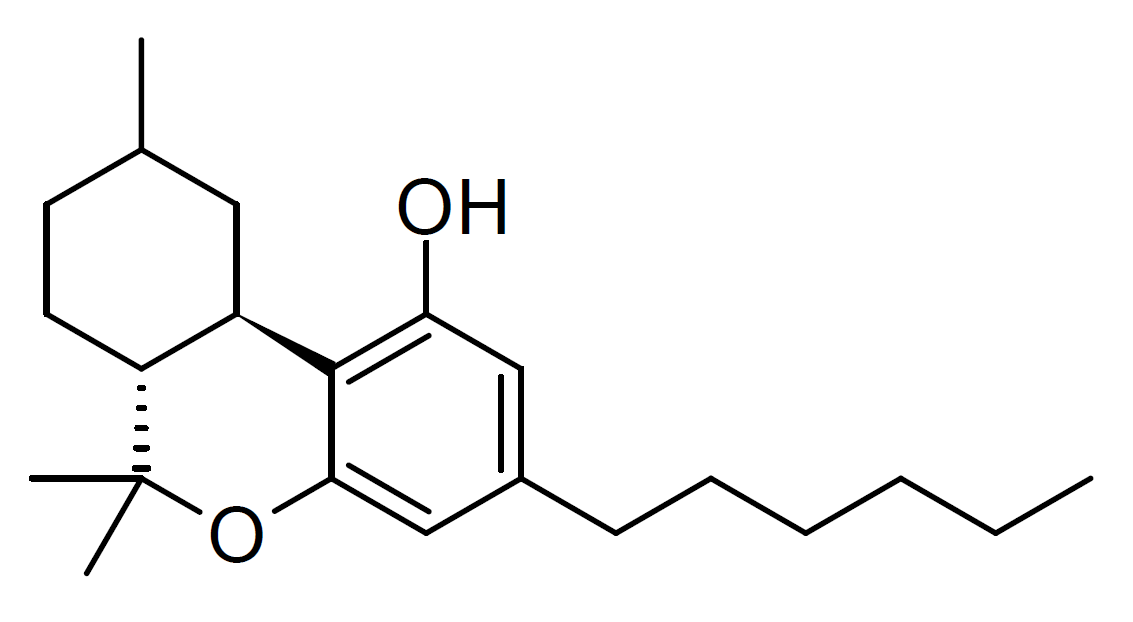

Identifiers
- IUPAC name: (6aR,10aR)-6,6,9-trimethyl-3-hexyl-6a,7,8,9,10,10a-hexahydrobenzo[c]chromen-1-ol

Chemical and physical data
- Formula: C_{22}H_{34}O_{2}
- Molar mass: 330.512 g·mol^{−1}
- 3D model (JSmol): Interactive image
- SMILES: CCCCCCc1cc2OC(C)(C)[C@@H]3CCC(C)C[C@H]3c2c(O)c1
- InChI: InChI=InChI=1S/C22H34O2/c1-5-6-7-8-9-16-13-19(23)21-17-12-15(2)10-11-18(17)22(3,4)24-20(21)14-16/h13-15,17-18,23H,5-12H2,1-4H3/t15?,17-,18-/m1/s1; Key:OKXUDFJPZMVBEH-HSFDIDPMSA-N

Hexahydrocannabihexol (HHCH) is a semi-synthetic cannabinoid derivative. It was first synthesised by Roger Adams in 1942 and found to be more potent than either the pentyl or heptyl homologues, or the unsaturated tetrahydrocannabinol analogue. HHCH was first identified as a designer drug in Sweden in September 2023.

== Legality ==
HHCH is classified as an "intoxicating cannabinoid" in Colorado and requires a license for its manufacture or distribution.

In Japan, after several people who had eaten gummy candies containing HHCH fell ill, this chemical was officially added to the list of designated substances. And since 2 December 2023, it has been illegal to possess, use, or sell it.

== See also ==
- Hexahydrocannabinol (HHC)
- Hexahydrocannabiphorol (HHCP)
- Parahexyl
- Tetrahydrocannabihexol (THCH)
