= Tetrahydrocannabiphorol =

Cannabinoid agonist compound

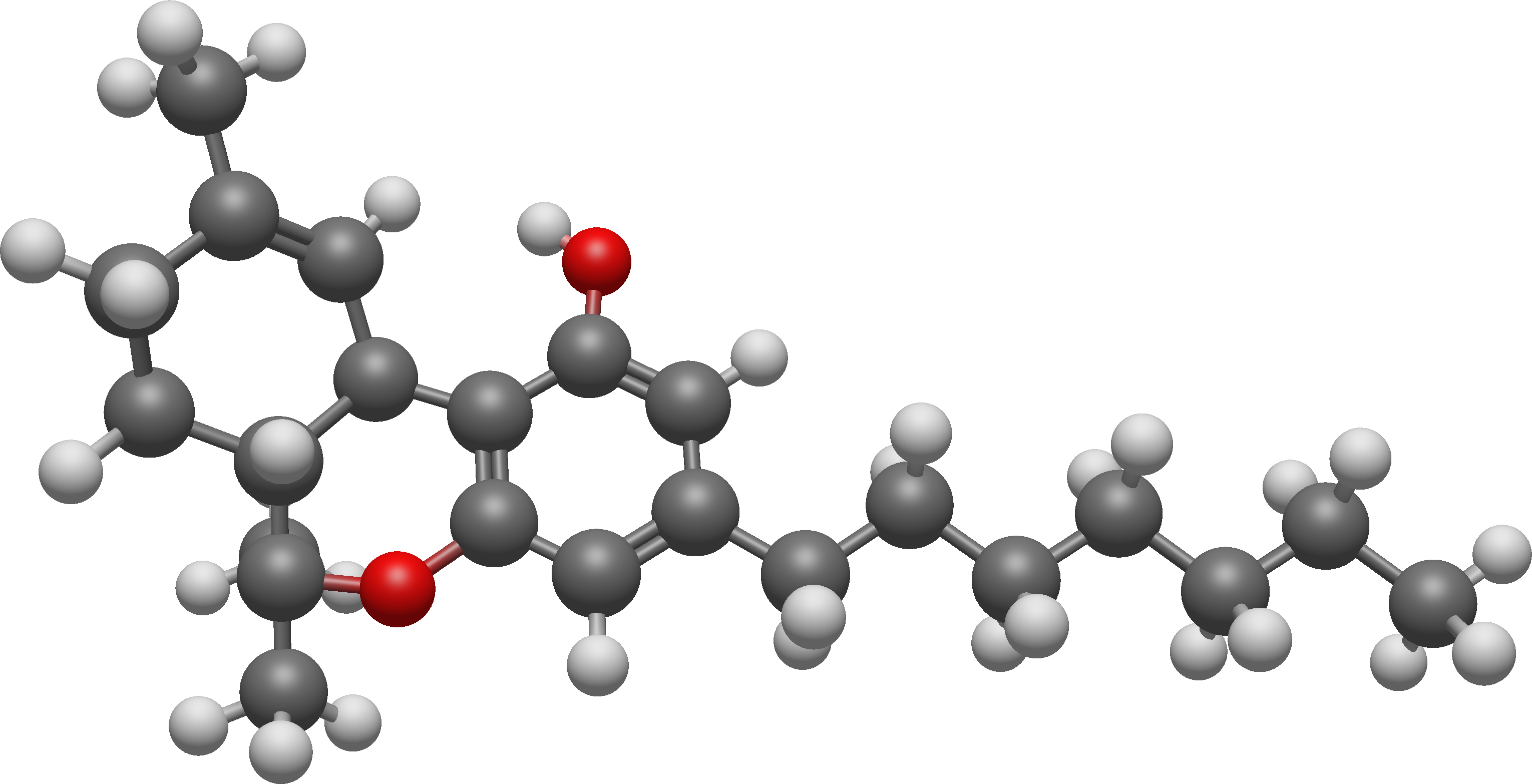

Clinical data
- Pronunciation: /tɛtʃrəhaɪdroʊkənæbɪfoʊrɔːl/
- Other names: (-)-Trans-Δ^{9}-tetrahydrocannabiphorol, Δ^{9}-THCP, (C7)-Δ^{9}-THC, THC-Heptyl
- Drug class: Cannabinoid

Identifiers
- IUPAC name: (6aR,10aR)-3-heptyl-6,6,9-trimethyl-6a,7,8,10a-tetrahydrobenzo[c]chromen-1-ol
- CAS Number: 54763-99-4
- PubChem CID: 6453074
- ChemSpider: 4955468
- UNII: WTK87HN3LG
- CompTox Dashboard (EPA): DTXSID70203228

Chemical and physical data
- Formula: C_{23}H_{34}O_{2}
- Molar mass: 342.523 g·mol^{−1}
- 3D model (JSmol): Interactive image
- SMILES: CCCCCCCc3cc2OC(C)(C)[C@@H]1CCC(C)=C[C@H]1c2c(O)c3
- InChI: InChI=1S/C23H34O2/c1-5-6-7-8-9-10-17-14-20(24)22-18-13-16(2)11-12-19(18)23(3,4)25-21(22)15-17/h13-15,18-19,24H,5-12H2,1-4H3/t18-,19-/m1/s1; Key:OJTMRZHYTZMJKX-RTBURBONSA-N

Tetrahydrocannabiphorol (THCP) is a potent phytocannabinoid, a CB_{1} and CB_{2} receptor agonist which was known as a synthetic homologue of tetrahydrocannabinol (THC), but for the first time in 2019 was isolated as a trace natural product from Cannabis sativa.

THCP is structurally similar to Δ^{9}-THC, the main active component of cannabis, but with the pentyl side chain extended to heptyl. Since it has a longer side chain, its cannabinoid effects are "far higher than Δ^{9}-THC itself." Tetrahydrocannabiphorol has a reported binding affinity of 1.2 nM at CB_{1}, approximately 33 times that of Δ^{9}-THC (40 nM at CB_{1}), however this does not mean it's 33x stronger per milligram.

THCP was studied by Roger Adams as early as 1942.

== Isomers ==
=== Delta-3-THCP ===
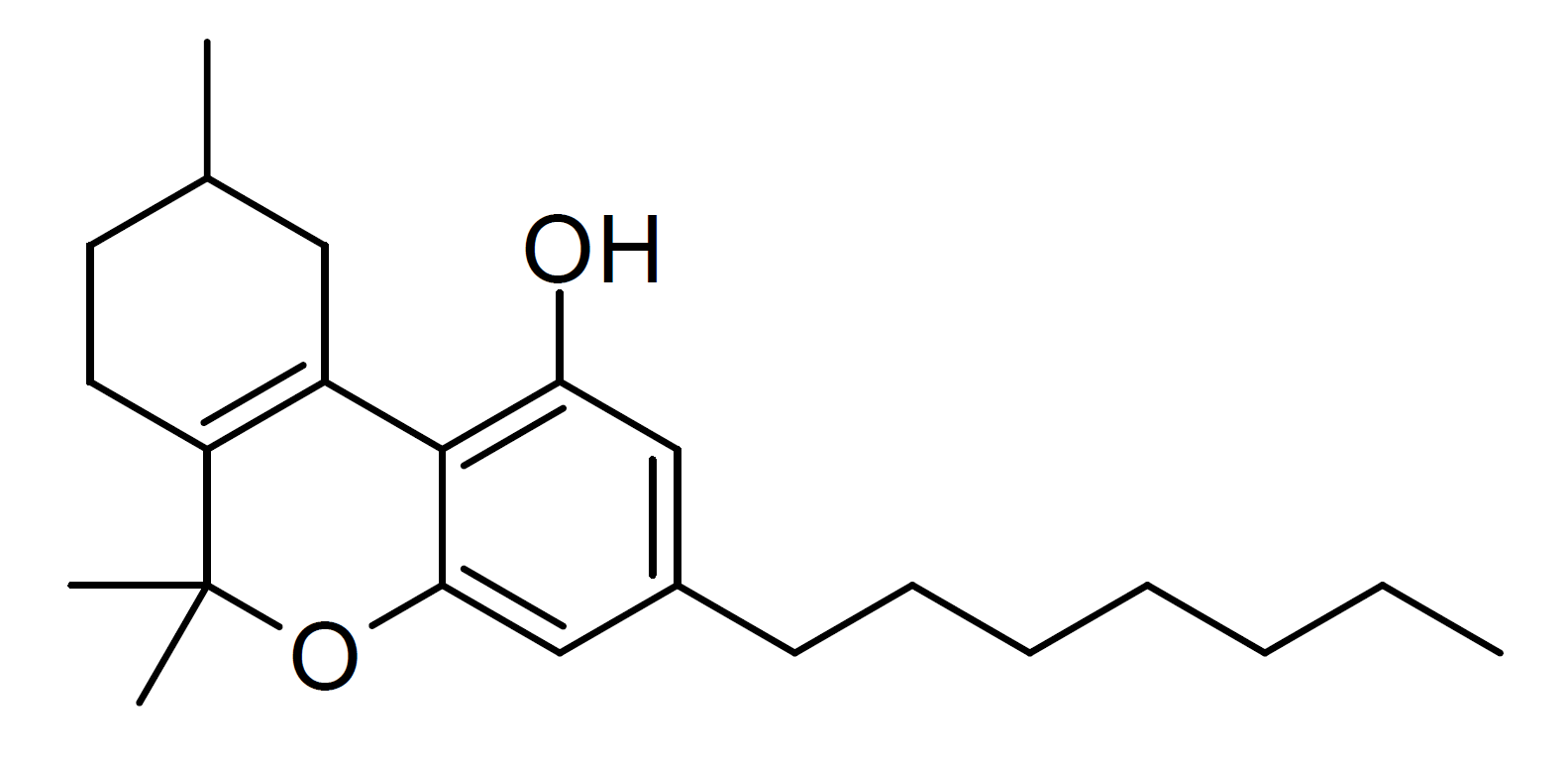
Δ^{3}-THCP

The Δ^{3}/Δ^{6a(10a)} isomer Δ^{3}-THCP was synthesised in 1941, and was found to have around the same potency as Δ^{3}-THC, unlike the hexyl homologue parahexyl which was significantly stronger.

=== Delta-8-THCP ===
JWH-091 (Δ^{8}-THCP) , CAS# 51768-60-6

The Δ^{8} isomer is also known as a synthetic cannabinoid under the code name JWH-091. It's unconfirmed whether or not JWH-091 is found naturally in cannabis plants. JWH-091 has approximately double the binding affinity at the CB_{1} receptor (22 nM ± 3.9 nM) in comparison to Δ^{9}-THC (40.7 nM ± 1.7 nM) or Δ^{8}-THC (44 nM ± 12 nM), but appears significantly lower in vitro than the binding activity of Δ^{9}-THCP (K_{i} = 1.2 nM)

== Natural cannabis occurrence ==
The Δ^{9} isomer of THCP occurs naturally in cannabis plants, but in very small amounts. A 2021 study reported the content of Δ^{9}-THCP ranging from 0.0023% to 0.0136% (w/w) (approximately 0.02–0.13 mg/g biomass) without correlation to THC percentage in Δ^{9}-THC-dominant strains of cannabis; that study failed to detect THCP in CBD-dominant strains.

== See also ==
- Δ8-THC-DMH
- Nabilone
- Hexahydrocannabiphorol (HHCP)
- 1,2-Didehydro-3-oxo-THCO
- Delta-8-THC
- Parahexyl
- Perrottetinene
- Tetrahydrocannabivarin (THCV)
- Tetrahydrocannabutol
- Tetrahydrocannabihexol (THCH)
- THCP-O-acetate
- Cannabidiphorol (CBDP)
