= 11-Hydroxyhexahydrocannabinol =

Chemical compound

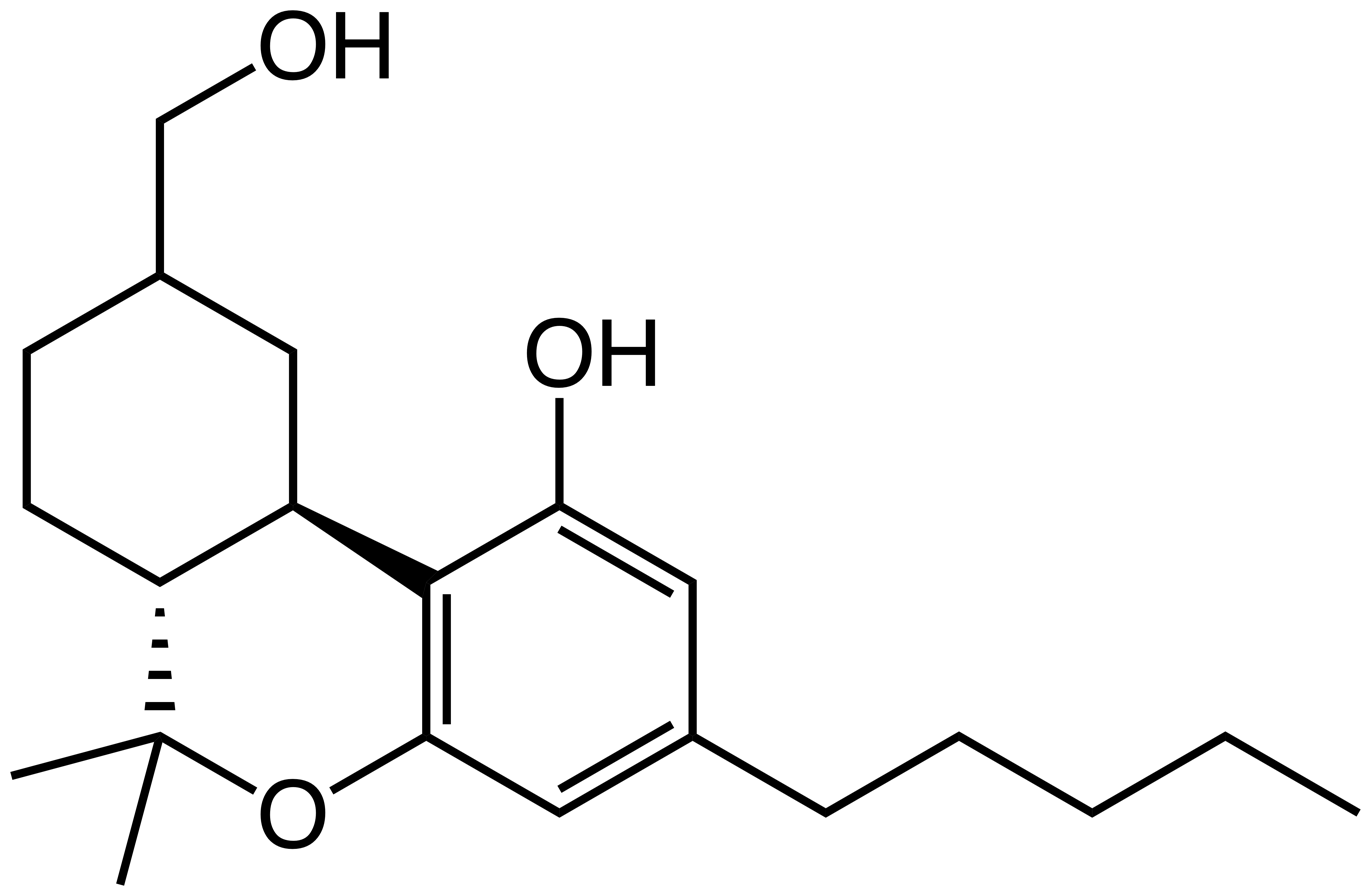

Identifiers
- IUPAC name: (6aR,9R,10aR)-9-(hydroxymethyl)-6,6-dimethyl-3-pentyl-6a,7,8,9,10,10a-hexahydrobenzo[c]chromen-1-ol
- CAS Number: 64663-39-4
- PubChem CID: 127684
- ChemSpider: 113271
- CompTox Dashboard (EPA): DTXSID00983283

Chemical and physical data
- Formula: C_{21}H_{32}O_{3}
- Molar mass: 332.484 g·mol^{−1}
- 3D model (JSmol): Interactive image
- SMILES: CCCCCC1=CC(=C2[C@@H]3C[C@@H](CC[C@H]3C(OC2=C1)(C)C)CO)O
- InChI: InChI=1S/C21H32O3/c1-4-5-6-7-14-11-18(23)20-16-10-15(13-22)8-9-17(16)21(2,3)24-19(20)12-14/h11-12,15-17,22-23H,4-10,13H2,1-3H3/t15-,16-,17-/m1/s1; Key:LXSFNMQURHTPIT-BRWVUGGUSA-N

11-Hydroxyhexahydrocannabinol (11-OH-9α-HHC and 11-OH-9β-HHC, or alternatively 7-OH-HHC under the monoterpenoid numbering system) is an active metabolite of tetrahydrocannabinol (THC) and a metabolite of the trace cannabinoid hexahydrocannabinol (HHC).

In a pathway that parallels the metabolism of the THC family of cannabinoids, following ingestion HHC undergoes hepatic metabolism by cytochrome p450 (predominantly the CYP3A4 isozyme, with some contribution from CYP2C9 and CYP2C19) to a multitude of oxygenated derivatives, including 8-OH-HHC and 11-OH-HHC. C11-oxidation is the major pathway of THC and HHC metabolism.

Like other 11-OH cannabinoid metabolites, 11-OH-9β-HHC retains activity comparable to HHC itself while the 9α-isomer is significantly less active. However, upon formation it is rapidly metabolized further to the inactive 11-carboxylates, producing a shortened half-life within the body and lowering its bioavailability considerably through first-pass metabolism.

The 11-OH-9β-HHC isomer is the structurally related methylene homologue of 11-Nor-9β-hydroxyhexahydrocannabinol also known as 9-Nor-9β-hydroxyhexahydrocannabinol.

HU-243 is a synthetic analog of 11-OH-9β-HHC in which the natural n-pentyl side chain is replaced with a geminal-dimethylheptyl substitution. This significantly increases HU-243s binding affinity for the CB1 and CB2 receptors.

== See also ==
- 9-Hydroxyhexahydrocannabinol
- 9-Nor-9β-hydroxyhexahydrocannabinol
- 11-Hydroxycannabinol
- HU-210
- 8-hydroxyhexahydrocannabinol
