= 8-Hydroxyhexahydrocannabinol =

Cannabinoid metabolite

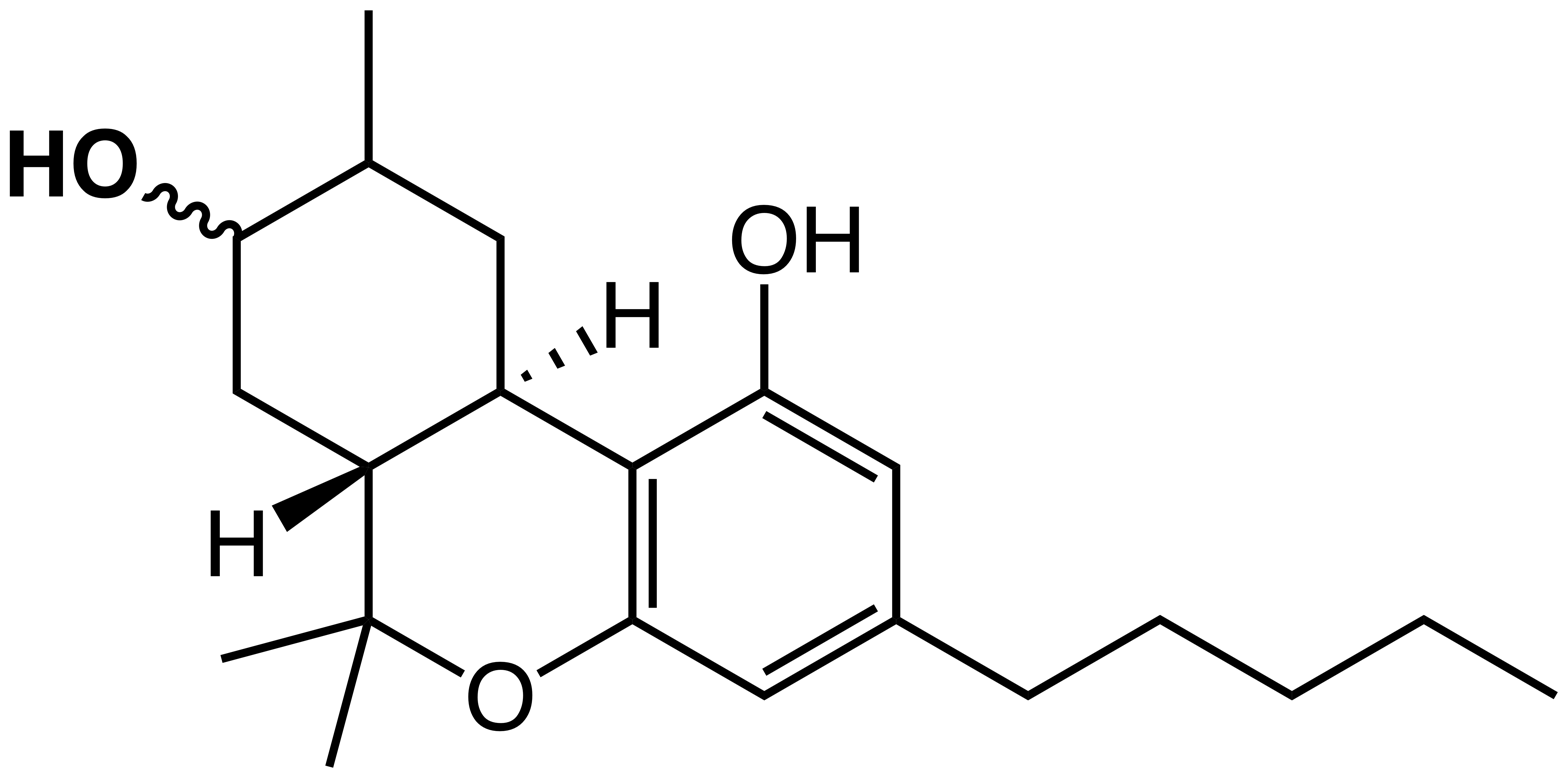

Names
- Other names 8-OH-HHC

Identifiers
CAS Number	36403-92-6
3D model (JSmol)	Interactive image
ChemSpider	128937963
PubChem CID	102118411
- InChI: InChI=1S/C21H32O3/c1-5-6-7-8-14-10-18(23)20-15-9-13(2)17(22)12-16(15)21(3,4)24-19(20)11-14/h10-11,13,15-17,22-23H,5-9,12H2,1-4H3/t13-,15+,16+,17+/m0/s1 Key: CIVSDEYXXUHBPV-RKTXRCNFSA-N
- SMILES: CCCCCC1=CC(=C2[C@@H]3C[C@@H]([C@@H](C[C@H]3C(OC2=C1)(C)C)O)C)O

Properties
Chemical formula	C_{21}H_{32}O_{3}
Molar mass	332.484 g·mol^{−1}
- Except where otherwise noted, data are given for materials in their standard state (at 25 °C [77 °F], 100 kPa). Infobox references

8-Hydroxyhexahydrocannabinols (8-OH-9α-HHC and 8-OH-9β-HHC) are active primary metabolites of hexahydrocannabinol (HHC) in animals and trace phytocannabinoids. The 8-OH-HHCs are produced in notable concentrations following HHC administration in several animal species, including humans. They have drawn research interest for therapeutic use & their role in HHC toxicology and stereoisomeric probes of the cannabinoid drug/receptor interaction.

Like Δ9-THC and Δ8-THC, HHC is processed by cytochrome P450 (CYP3A4, CYP2C9 and CYP2C19) to a series of oxygenated derivatives, some of which maintain activity. While 11-OH-HHC and its downstream products are the major metabolites of HHC metabolism, hydroxylation at C8 plays a varyingly significant role in animal species. Metabolite ratios are also subject to interspecies variation, with one study finding mice hepatocytes preferentially produced 8α-OH-HHC (49/5 α/β) while hamster hematocytes evidenced the opposing selectivity (20/43 α/β).

While 11-OH-HHC is quickly oxidized to the inactive, water-soluble 11-COOH-HHC, further oxidation of 8-OH instead yields the 8-oxo derivatives, which are then conjugated and excreted.

== Stereoisomerism ==
Four stereoisomers of 8-OH-HHC arise from C8-hydroxylation of hexahydrocannabinol.

There are four possible 8-OH-HHC metabolites arising from naturally derived HHCs: cis- and trans-8-OH-9α-HHC & cis- and trans-8-OH-9β-HHC. All four have been prepared synthetically to probe stereochemical effects on cannabinoid biological activity. In in vivo tests on rhesus macaques, Mechoulam and coworkers found the highest activity in the cis-8-OH-9β-HHC stereoisomer. All four forms are believed to be active.
