= C21H30O3 =

The molecular formula C_{21}H_{30}O_{3} (molar mass: 330.46 g/mol, exact mass: 330.2195 u) may refer to:

- Bezisterim
- Cannabielsoin
- 11-Deoxycorticosterone
- 3'-Hydroxy-THC
- 10-Hydroxy-THC
- 11-Hydroxy-THC
- 11-Hydroxy-Delta-8-THC
- 7-Hydroxycannabidiol
- Hydroxyprogesterones
  - 11α-Hydroxyprogesterone
  - 11β-Hydroxyprogesterone
  - 16α-Hydroxyprogesterone
  - 17α-Hydroxyprogesterone
- 16-O-Methylcafestol
- Nandrolone propionate
- Trestolone acetate
- Testosterone acetate
