= 10-Hydroxy-THC =

Identifiers
- IUPAC name: (6aR,10R,10aR)-6,6,9-trimethyl-3-pentyl-6a,7,10,10a-tetrahydrobenzo[c]chromene-1,10-diol
- CAS Number: 24902-23-6
- PubChem CID: 102506267
- ChemSpider: 58828755
- ChEMBL: ChEMBL3586106

Chemical and physical data
- Formula: C_{21}H_{30}O_{3}
- Molar mass: 330.468 g·mol^{−1}
- 3D model (JSmol): Interactive image
- SMILES: CCCCCC1=CC(=C2[C@H]3[C@@H](CC=C([C@@H]3O)C)C(OC2=C1)(C)C)O
- InChI: InChI=1S/C21H30O3/c1-5-6-7-8-14-11-16(22)19-17(12-14)24-21(3,4)15-10-9-13(2)20(23)18(15)19/h9,11-12,15,18,20,22-23H,5-8,10H2,1-4H3/t15-,18-,20+/m1/s1; Key:KQQMZTULVOWZJR-ZTNFWEORSA-N

10-Hydroxy-THC (10α-OH-Δ^{8}-THC) is a phytocannabinoid, identified in trace amounts as a component of Cannabis sativa in 2015. It has two epimers, 10α-THC and 10β-THC, of which the α epimer is the pharmacologically active component with similar or slightly higher potency compared to THC itself, while the β epimer is around 100x weaker in vitro and only partially substituted for THC in animal tests. It can also be made synthetically, and has been sold as a designer drug.

== See also ==
- 3'-Hydroxy-THC
- 8-Hydroxyhexahydrocannabinol
- 9-Hydroxyhexahydrocannabinol
- 8,11-Dihydroxytetrahydrocannabinol
- 10-Hydroxy-HHC
- 11-Hydroxy-THC
- 11-Hydroxy-Delta-8-THC
- Cannabiripsol
