= Cannabinoid receptor modulator =

Compound binding to cannabinoid receptors

A cannabinoid receptor modulator is a compound that bind to the cannabinoid receptors, which are receptors in the human body that regulate multiple physiological responses, including pain sensation, mood regulation, and appetite. The two main targets of cannabinoid receptors modulators are cannabinoid receptor 1 (CBR1) and cannabinoid receptor 2 (CBR2). By stimulating or inhibiting these receptors, the modulators can achieve different therapeutic effects, such as relieving pain, reducing vomiting, improving appetite and maintaining muscle tone.

Dronabinol, nabiximol, cannabidiol and nabilone are cannabinoid receptor modulators marketed as drugs for various therapeutic uses. These drugs also share some common adverse effects, including dizziness, headache, alteration in mental state, and diarrhoea. Recent research studies have explored other therapeutic potentials of the modulators, such as the antitumor effect of cannabidiol. Other cannabinoid receptor modulators are also under investigations.

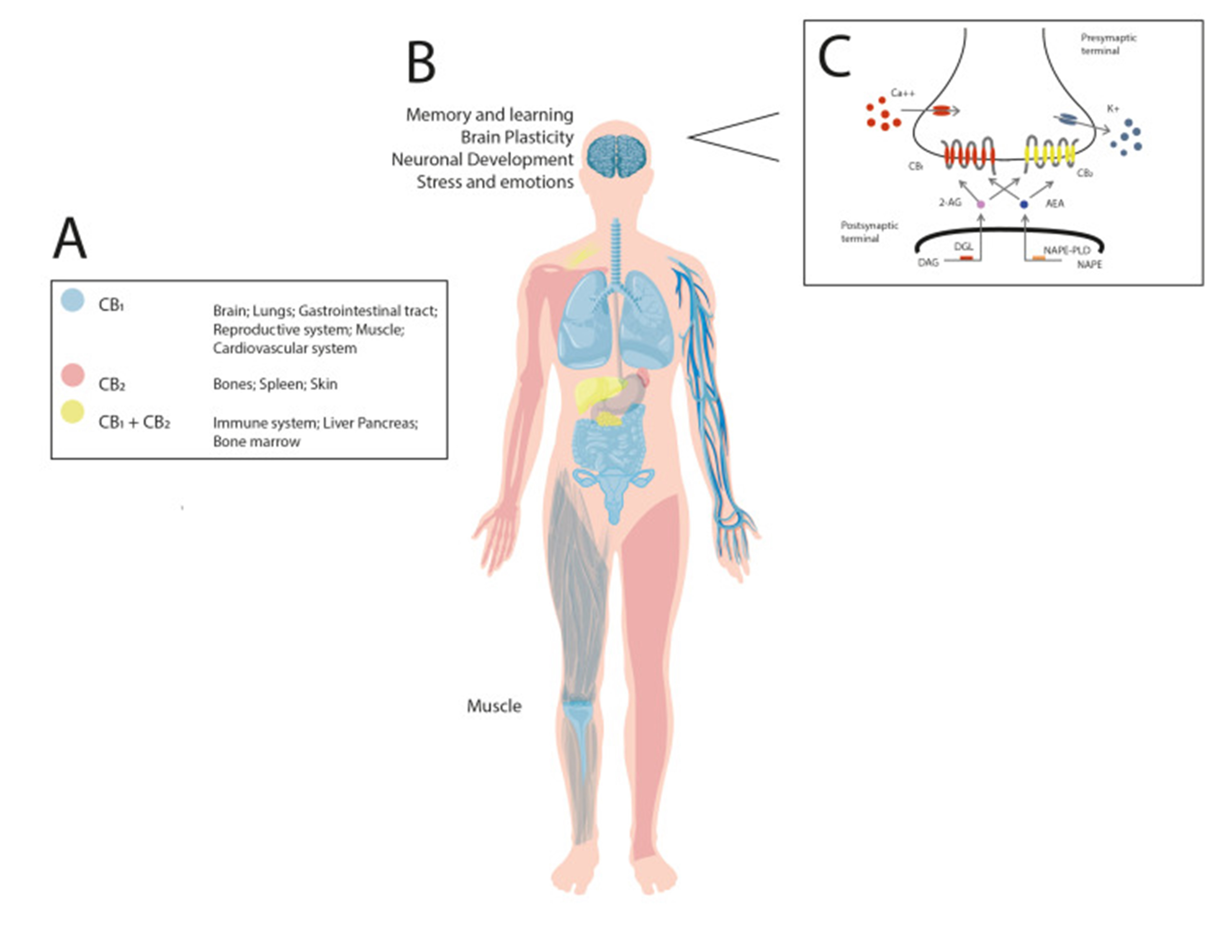
Cannabinoid receptor modulators interfere with the activity regulated by cannabinoid receptors (CBR1 and CBR2)

== Cannabinoid receptors ==
Cannabinoid receptor 1 (CBR1) and Cannabinoid receptor 2 (CBR2) are the two main binding targets in the endocannabinoid system. They share similar molecular shape and signalling mechanisms, but differ in their tissue distribution and effects.

CB1R mainly presents in the central nervous system, with its activation commonly associated with the regulation of mood, pain and appetite. CB2R is abundant in the immune tissues, for example spleen, lymph nodes and bone marrow. Its activation causes immunosuppressive effects.

== Therapeutic uses ==
Given that the endocannabinoid system maintains an internal balance in various body systems, cannabinoid receptor modulators, as compounds that interfere with the endocannabinoid system by interacting with its receptors, carry multiple therapeutic potentials.

Cannabinoid receptor 1 (CBR1) are a potential target for treating pain and cognitive impairment. However, modulators of CBR1 (molecules that interact with CB1R) have limited medical use due to psychotropic side effects (e.g. depression and anxiety) associated with CB1R interference. As the activation of cannabinoid receptor 2 (CBR2) has no psychotropic effects, modulators of CB2R (molecules that interact with CB2R) are investigated for various therapeutic potentials. CB2 receptor agonist (molecules that stimulate the activity of the receptors) has been investigated as treatment for pain, inflammation, immune disorders and brain diseases, whereas CB2 inverse agonist or antagonist (molecules that inhibit the activity of the receptors) for weight loss, mental disorder and osteoporosis.

Although the efficacy of cannabinoid receptor modulators is supported by preclinical evidence, only four cannabinoid receptor modulators are approved for therapeutic uses, with the rest under trials.

== Examples ==
=== Dronabinol ===
Chemical structure of dronabinol

==== Indications ====
Dronabinol, also known as tetrahydrocannabinol (THC), is a natural compound extracted from plants. It is available as Marinol® and Syndros®. It is used as an appetite stimulant in anorexia-associated weight loss in HIV/AIDS patients. An increase in patients' appetite and daily calorie intake with minimal improvement in weight and nausea is reported. Dronabinol is also indicated for chemotherapy-induced nausea and vomiting in cancer patients failing to respond to conventional antiemetics. Dronabinol is also used for cancer-related chronic pain in Europe.

==== Mechanism of action ====
Dronabinol partially stimulates both the cannabinoid receptor 1 (CBR1) and cannabinoid receptor 2 (CBR2), with a stronger stimulatory effect observed in the former. Dronabinol prevents nausea and vomiting and stimulates appetite by directly acting on the CB1 receptors in the vomiting and appetite control centres in the brain.

==== Adverse effects ====
The common side effects associated with the use of Dronabinol are diverse but generally mild. They generally resolved in a few days. Common side effects include dizziness, dry mouth and headache. Others are related to an alteration of mental state, such as euphoria, mood changes, anxiety, drowsiness and abnormal thinking. Yet, impairment of cognitive performance, including memory and alertness, is not reported. The incidence of side effects may be reduced with a delayed dosing to near bedtime. Dose reduction should be considered in patients with continual side effects.

==== Pharmacokinetics ====
Dronabinol reaches its highest concentration in blood within 1–2 hours of administration. Food intake increases the time and extent of drug absorption, causing a higher drug concentration in blood at a later time. The high lipid solubility of Dronabinol causes its accumulation in fatty organs such as the heart, liver and spleen.

Dronabinol is mostly metabolized by CYP2C9 (an enzyme majorly found in the liver) into 11-hydroxy-delta-9-THC, an active molecule that can enter the brain and cause depression or anxiety. More side effects may be seen in patients with diminished CYP2C9 enzyme activity due to the reduced dronabinol metabolism. Dronabinol is majorly eliminated from the body with faeces.

=== Nabilone ===
Chemical structure of nabilone

==== Indications ====
Nabilone, marketed under the brand name Cesamet®, is a synthetic form of tetrahydrocannabinol (THC). It is used to treat chemotherapy-induced nausea and vomiting in cancer patients who fail to have sufficient response to conventional antiemetic treatments. It is also used to treat anorexia and weight loss in AIDS patients.

==== Mechanism of action ====
Nabilone weakly stimulates cannabinoid receptor 1(CBR1) and cannabinoid receptor 2 (CBR2) in the central nervous system. It reduces vomiting mainly by interacting with CBR1. Nabilone shares some similarity with tetrahydrocannabinol (THC) in terms of chemical structure, but nabilone is also considered to be twice as active as THC.

==== Adverse effects ====
The most common adverse effects of nabilone include drowsiness, dizziness, dry mouth, euphoria, concentration difficulties, ataxia, and headache. It has the potential to affect the central nervous system, resulting in anxiety, disorientation, depression, hallucinations and psychosis. Moreover, it may lead to cardiovascular side effects such as orthostatic hypotension and tachycardia. Gastrointestinal adverse reactions also include anorexia, constipation, nausea, vomiting, and oral paresthesia (sensation of tingling in the mouth).

==== Pharmacokinetics ====
Nabilone can be readily absorbed from the small intestine into the systemic circulation. The rate and extent of absorption of nabilone are not affected by food intake. It takes around 2 hours to reach its highest concentration in blood. It is distributed extensively and quickly in various body tissues including liver where it is rapidly metabolised into several active metabolites. CYP450 enzymes may also be involved in some of its metabolism. Nabilone is mainly excreted with faeces.

=== Cannabidiol (CBD) ===
Chemical structure of cannabidiol

==== Indications ====
Cannabidiol, available as Epidiolex® in high concentration, is a synthetic non-classical cannabinoid marketed for the treatment of refractory epilepsy in patients with Dravet syndrome (epilepsy condition since infancy), Lennox-Gastaut syndrome (severe epilepsy in children), and tuberous sclerosis (a genetic condition causing the formation of non-cancerous tumours in different body areas) in patients aged 1 or above. A reduction in the frequency seizures (uncontrolled shaking of body due to abnormal brain activity) and a better seizure control are seen among patients.

==== Mechanism of action ====
Cannabinoid inhibits the activity of both cannabinoid receptor 1 (CBR1) and cannabinoid receptor 2 (CBR2), with a stronger inhibitory effect observed in the former. Cannabidiol also interacts with non-cannabinoid receptors, including serotonin 1A receptors. Yet, the mechanism of cannabinoid in controlling seizures is not clearly established.

==== Adverse effects ====
Cannabidiol use is associated with a reduction in appetite, diarrhoea, dry mouth, sedation and dizziness. These adverse events are mild and generally diminish with continued use. Additionally, an increased risk of blurred vision and interference with liver function with elevated levels of liver enzymes are reported. Due to potential liver injury, dose adjustment may be required in patients with liver diseases or taking other medications that interfere with the metabolism of cannabidiol.

==== Pharmacokinetics ====
Due to high lipid solubility, cannabidiol is poorly absorbed in the intestine. The absorbed cannabidiol accumulates in adipose tissue or albumin (proteins in blood), which prolongs its elimination from the body. Most absorbed cannabidiol is converted into other metabolites by various enzymes in the liver and intestine, including CYP2C19 and CYP3A4. Cannabidiol is mainly excreted from the body with faeces.

=== Nabiximol ===
==== Indications ====
Nabiximol, sold under the trade name Sativex®, is a natural mixture of tetrahydrocannabinol (THC) and cannabidiol (CBD) in a 1:1 ratio. Although not approved in the United States, Nabiximol is approved in some European countries as well as Canada for use as an buccal spray for symptomatic relief of spasticity and neuropathic pain in multiple sclerosis (MS). Different reviews were conducted to examine the effects of nabiximol on spasticity in multiple sclerosis, but their results were inconsistent. As some systemic reviews concluded that nabiximols is efficient in refractory spasticity of multiple sclerosis not responsive to other standard treatment, it may be considered as an adjuvant therapy to the standard therapy.

==== Mechanism of action ====
One of the components in nabiximol, tetrahydrocannabinol (THC), weakly stimulates cannabinoid receptor 1(CBR1) and cannabinoid receptor 2 (CBR2) to produce analgesic effect (pain relief). Another component of nabiximol, cannabidiol (CBD), slightly inhibits the proliferation of T cells (a type of immune cells) and the activity of microglia (cells within the brain that regulate neural activity and repair).

==== Adverse effects ====
The most commonly reported adverse effects of nabiximol is dizziness, followed by drownsiness, fatigue, and nausea. Other adverse effects include anorexia, constipation, diarrhea, dysgeusia (taste disorder), oral ulcer, staining of tooth, upper abdominal pain, vomiting, xerostomia (dry mouth), confusion, and disorientation.

==== Pharmacokinetics ====
Nabiximol is rapidly absorbed from the buccal mucosa (membranes inside the mouth). It is then widely distributed in different body tissues, especially fatty tissues due to its high lipophilicity. Thus, it may be stored in the fatty tissues for as long as four weeks, which then slowly release back into the blood stream. THC and CBD, the two components of nabiximol is mainly metabolised in the liver via CYP450 enzymes (2C9, 2C19, 2D6 and 3A4) to 11-hydroxy-tetrahydrocannabinol and 7-hydroxy-cannabidiol respectively. Excretion is primarily in faeces.

=== Rimonabant ===
Chemical structure of rimonabant

Rimonabant was originally approved as an anti-obesity drug. It confers a weight-lowering effect by inhibiting the appetite stimulating effect of cannabinoid receptor 1 (CBR1). Weight loss is achieved with continued treatment, but rebound upon stopping. Despite its efficacy, Rimonabant was withdrawn worldwide due to increased risks of depression, anxiety and suicide.

Its withdrawal dispelled research interest on CBR1 modulators, with recent investigation on pharmacological strategies to avoid serious side effects.

== Research progress ==
Cannabinoids have multiple therapeutic potentials, including pain, nausea and vomiting, feeding disorder, glaucoma, neurodegeneration, multiple sclerosis, schizophrenia, cancer, epilepsy, stress and anxiety. There are ongoing investigations on the currently marketed drugs, exploring their therapeutic potentials on top of the existing medical uses. For instance, some recent studies have illustrated the antitumor effects of CBD, with the underlying mechanisms being the induction of cell cycle arrest and autophagy, promotion of apoptosis, modulation of angiogenesis, and inhibition of tumor cell migration and invasion. Several clinical reports also showed that CBD can be used to treat cancer.

The use of other cannabinoid receptor modulators are also under investigations. Olorinab, Ajulemic acid, NTRX-07 and CNTX-6016 are examples of the new cannabinoid receptors modulators undergoing different stages of clinical trials for their respective therapeutic uses, such as treating Alzheimer's disease and diabetic neuropathy.
