= Menabitan =

Chemical compound

Clinical data
- ATC code: None

Legal status
- Legal status: US: Analogue to a Schedule I/II drug (Schedule I)

Identifiers
- IUPAC name: [5,5-dimethyl-8-(3-methyloctan-2-yl)-2-prop-2-ynyl-3,4-dihydro-1H-chromeno[4,3-c]pyridin-10-yl] 2-methyl-4-(2-methylpiperidin-1-yl)butanoate
- CAS Number: 83784-21-8 58019-50-4 (HCl)
- PubChem CID: 189877
- ChemSpider: 164903
- UNII: 967H1G7V3P
- CompTox Dashboard (EPA): DTXSID701003840

Chemical and physical data
- Formula: C_{37}H_{56}N_{2}O_{3}
- Molar mass: 576.866 g·mol^{−1}
- 3D model (JSmol): Interactive image
- SMILES: CCCCCC(C)C(C)C1=CC2=C(C3=C(CCN(C3)CC#C)C(O2)(C)C)C(=C1)OC(=O)C(C)CCN4CCCCC4C
- InChI: InChI=1S/C37H56N2O3/c1-9-11-12-15-26(3)29(6)30-23-33(41-36(40)27(4)17-22-39-20-14-13-16-28(39)5)35-31-25-38(19-10-2)21-18-32(31)37(7,8)42-34(35)24-30/h2,23-24,26-29H,9,11-22,25H2,1,3-8H3; Key:ZWLPJYVIMWAEDC-UHFFFAOYSA-N

Menabitan (INN: SP-204) is a synthetic drug which acts as a potent cannabinoid receptor agonist. It is closely related to natural cannabinoids of the tetrahydrocannabinol (THC) group, differing mainly by its longer and branched side chain, and the replacement of the 9-position carbon with a nitrogen. It is a structural analog of nabitan and dimethylheptylpyran. It was studied as an analgesic in the 1970s and was found to possess analgesic effects in both humans and animals but was never marketed.

Due to its structural similarity to the Schedule I/III drug THC, it can be treated as a Schedule I drug within the United States legal system under the Federal Analogue Act.

== See also ==
- A-40174 (SP-1)
- A-41988
- Dimethylheptylpyran
- Nabitan
