= Tinabinol =

Chemical compound

Tinabinol INN: SP-119
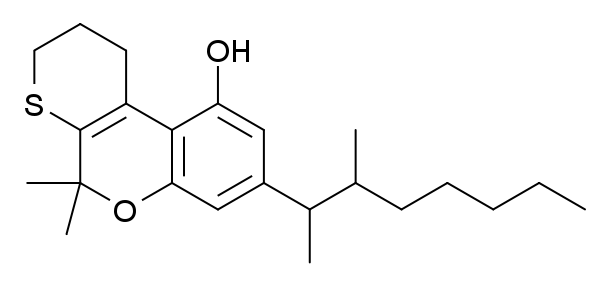

Clinical data
- Drug class: Cannabinoid
- ATC code: None

Identifiers
- IUPAC name: 5,5-dimethyl-8-(3-methyl-2-octanyl)-1,2,3,5-tetrahydrothiopyrano[2,3-c]chromen-10-ol
- CAS Number: 50708-95-7
- PubChem CID: 65443
- ChemSpider: 58905
- UNII: 455Y914AKK
- CompTox Dashboard (EPA): DTXSID20866160

Chemical and physical data
- Formula: C_{23}H_{34}O_{2}S
- Molar mass: 374.58 g·mol^{−1}
- 3D model (JSmol): Interactive image
- SMILES: O3c1cc(cc(O)c1\C2=C(\SCCC2)C3(C)C)C(C)C(C)CCCCC
- InChI: InChI=1S/C23H34O2S/c1-6-7-8-10-15(2)16(3)17-13-19(24)21-18-11-9-12-26-22(18)23(4,5)25-20(21)14-17/h13-16,24H,6-12H2,1-5H3; Key:YCNTYPIGYVTFBO-UHFFFAOYSA-N

Tinabinol (INN: SP-119) is a synthetic cannabinoid drug that is a sulfur based analogue of dimethylheptylpyran which was patented as an antihypertensive but was never marketed.

== See also ==
- Dimethylheptylpyran
- Dronabinol
- Tetrahydrocannabinol
- Nabitan
