= 11-Hydroxycannabinol =

Chemical compound

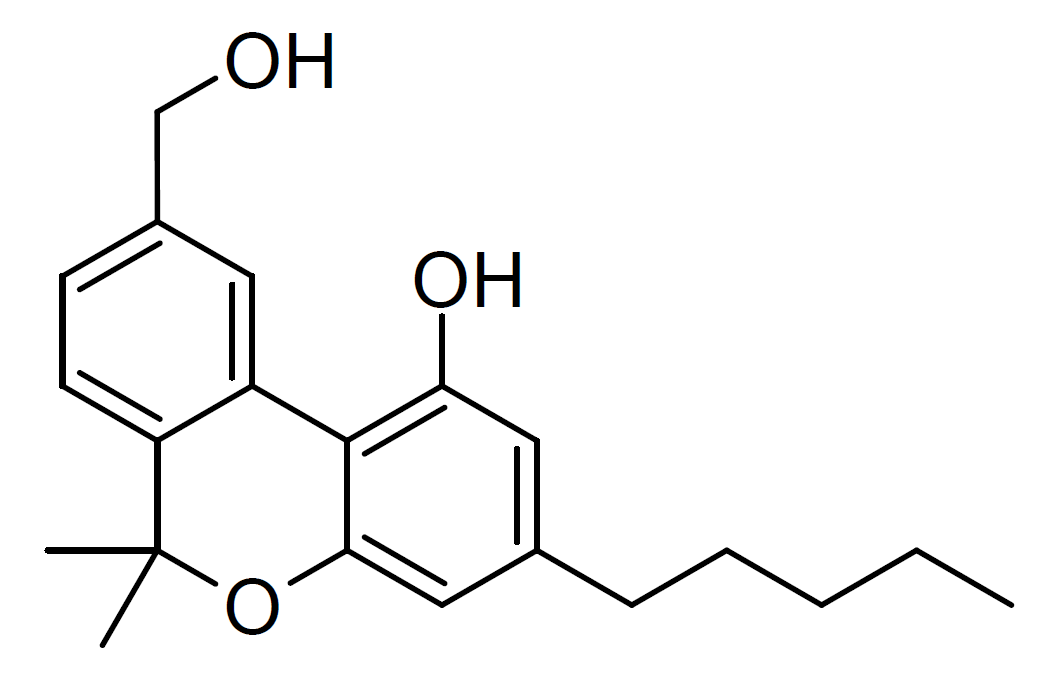

Identifiers
- IUPAC name: 9-(hydroxymethyl)-6,6-dimethyl-3-pentylbenzo[c]chromen-1-ol
- CAS Number: 30432-08-7
- PubChem CID: 3082311
- ChemSpider: 2339756
- ChEMBL: ChEMBL109972
- CompTox Dashboard (EPA): DTXSID60184517

Chemical and physical data
- Formula: C_{21}H_{26}O_{3}
- Molar mass: 326.436 g·mol^{−1}
- 3D model (JSmol): Interactive image
- SMILES: CCCCCC1=CC(=C2C(=C1)OC(C3=C2C=C(C=C3)CO)(C)C)O
- InChI: InChI=1S/C21H26O3/c1-4-5-6-7-14-11-18(23)20-16-10-15(13-22)8-9-17(16)21(2,3)24-19(20)12-14/h8-12,22-23H,4-7,13H2,1-3H3; Key:YDKZOUNVEIGJPO-UHFFFAOYSA-N

11-Hydroxycannabinol (11-OH-CBN) is the active metabolite of cannabinol (CBN), one of several cannabinoid components of cannabis, and has also been isolated from cannabis itself. It is more potent than CBN itself, acting as an agonist of CB_{1} with around the same potency as THC, but also as a weak antagonist at CB_{2}.

== See also ==
- 11-Hydroxyhexahydrocannabinol
- 11-Hydroxy-THC
- 11-Hydroxy-Delta-8-THC
- Cannabinodiol
