= Cannabinol =

Naturally-occurring cannabinoid

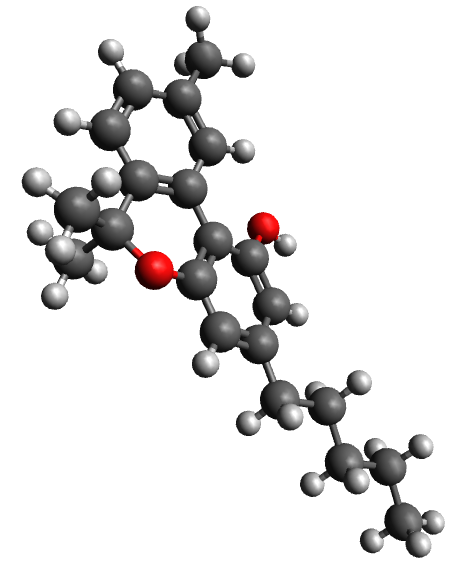

Legal status
- Legal status: CA: Unscheduled; UK: Class B; US: Unscheduled

Identifiers
- IUPAC name: 6,6,9-Trimethyl-3-pentyl-benzo[c]chromen-1-ol
- CAS Number: 521-35-7
- PubChem CID: 2543
- IUPHAR/BPS: 740
- ChemSpider: 2447
- UNII: 7UYP6MC9GH
- KEGG: C07580
- ChEMBL: ChEMBL74415
- CompTox Dashboard (EPA): DTXSID3048996
- ECHA InfoCard: 100.216.772

Chemical and physical data
- Formula: C_{21}H_{26}O_{2}
- Molar mass: 310.437 g·mol^{−1}
- 3D model (JSmol): Interactive image
- Melting point: 76–77 °C (169–171 °F)
- Solubility in water: Insoluble in water, soluble in methanol and ethanol mg/mL (20 °C)
- SMILES: Oc2cc(cc1OC(c3c(c12)cc(cc3)C)(C)C)CCCCC
- InChI: InChI=1S/C21H26O2/c1-5-6-7-8-15-12-18(22)20-16-11-14(2)9-10-17(16)21(3,4)23-19(20)13-15/h9-13,22H,5-8H2,1-4H3; Key:VBGLYOIFKLUMQG-UHFFFAOYSA-N

Cannabinol (CBN) is a mildly psychoactive phytocannabinoid that acts as a low affinity partial agonist at the CB_{1} and CB_{2} receptors of the endocannabinoid system (ECS).

Although CBN shares the same mechanism of action as other phytocannabinoids such as tetrahydrocannabinol (THC), it has a lower affinity for CB_{1} receptors, meaning that much higher doses of CBN are required in order to experience intoxicating effects.

It was the first cannabinoid to be isolated from plants of genus Cannabis and was discovered in 1896.

== Pharmacology ==
=== Pharmacodynamics ===
Both THC and CBN activate the CB1 (K_{i} = 211.2 nM) and CB2 (K_{i} = 126.4 nM) receptors. Each compound acts as a low affinity partial agonist at CB1 receptors with THC demonstrating 5x–10× greater affinity to the CB1 receptor. Like THC, CBN has a higher selectivity for CB2 receptors which are located throughout the central and peripheral nervous system, but are primarily associated with immune function. CB2 receptors are known to be located on immune cells throughout the body, including macrophages, T cells, and B cells. These immune cells have been shown to decrease production of immune-related chemical signals (e.g., cytokines) or undergo apoptosis as a consequence of CB2 agonism by CBN. In cell culture, CBN demonstrates antimicrobial effects, particularly in instances of antibiotic-resistant bacteria. CBN has also been reported to act as an ANKTM1 channel agonist at high concentrations (>20nM). While some phytocannabinoids have been shown to interact with nociceptive and immune-related signaling via transient receptor potential channels (e.g., TRPV1 and TRPM8), there is currently limited evidence to suggest that CBN acts in this way. In preclinical rodent studies, CBN, anandamide and other CB1 agonists have demonstrated inhibitory effects on GI motility, reversible via CB1R blockade (i.e., antagonism).

In considering the efficacy of cannabis-based products, there remains controversy surrounding a concept termed “the entourage effect”. This concept describes a widely reported but poorly-understood synergistic effect of certain cannabinoids when phytocannabinoids are coadministered with other naturally occurring chemical compounds in the cannabis plant (e.g., flavonoids, terpenoids, alkaloids). This entourage effect is often cited to explain the superior efficacy observed in some studies of whole-plant-derived cannabis therapeutics as compared to isolated or synthesized individual cannabis constituents.

==== Putative receptor targets ====
The table highlights several common cannabinoids along with putative receptor targets and therapeutic properties. Exogenous (plant-derived) phytocannabinoids are identified with an asterisk while remaining chemicals represent well-known endocannabinoids (i.e., endogenously produced cannabinoid receptor ligands).

Full Name	Known Receptor Targets	Putative Therapeutic Properties
Cannabichromene (CBC)	Agonist at CB2, TRPV3, and most potent phytocannabinoid at TRPA1; Very low efficacy at TRPV1 and TRPV4, but may reduce expression of TRPV4 in the presence of inflammation; High affinity for CB1 but no observed functional activity; Antagonist at TRPM8	Antimicrobial and anti-inflammatory; Potential neuroprotective effects; Potential efficacy in treatment of inflammatory pain
Cannabidiol (CBD)	Very weak affinity for CB1 and CB2; Conflicting reports but generally described as negative allosteric modulator at CB1 & CB2, altering THC activity when THC & CBD are coadministered; Agonist at TRPA1, TRPV1 (high potency at this “capsaicin receptor” without ablative effects), TRPV2, TRPV3, PPARγ, 5-HT1A, A2 and A1 adenosine receptors; Highest potency at TRPV1; Antagonist at GPR55, GPR18, 5-HT3A, with highest potency as antagonist at TRPM8; Inverse agonist at GPR3, GPR6, and GPR12	Anti-inflammatory; Anti-convulsant; Potential efficacy in treatment of inflammatory and chronic pain
Cannabigerol (CBG)	Low affinity agonist and partial agonist at CB1 and CB2, respectively; Agonist at α2adrenoceptor and TRP channels such as TRPA1, TRPV2, and TRPV3, with highest potency as agonist at TRPV1; Readily desensitizes but low affinity for TRPV4; Antagonist at 5-HT1A and TRPM8	Anti-microbial, anti-inflammatory, and anti-nociceptive effects; Neuroprotective properties via mitigation of oxidative stress; Potential anti-tumor agent; Potential efficacy in treatment of chemotherapy-induced muscle atrophy and weight loss
Cannabinol (CBN)	Agonist at CB1 and CB2, with some evidence of slightly higher affinity at CB2; Low affinity agonist at TRPV1, TRPV2, TRPV3, TRPV4, and TRPA1, but readily desensitizes TRPV4; Antagonist at TRPM8	Antimicrobial and anti-inflammatory / immunosuppressive effects; Potential efficacy in treatment of ocular disease and epidermolysis bullosa; Reported neuroprotective effects (synergistic if coadministered with other cannabinoids); Relevance to pain, itch, and inflammation via TRP channel activity
Tetrahydrocannabinol (THC) / Delta-9-Tetrahydrocannabinol (Δ^{9}-THC)	Agonist at CB1 and CB2, as well as GPR55, GPR18, PPARγ, and TRPA1; Antagonist at TRPM8 and 5-HT3A; Differing activity across TRP channels: highest potency phytocannabinoid at TRPV2; modest activity at TRPV3, TRPV4, TRPA1, and TRPM8; no activity observed at TRPV1; Importantly, 11-OH-THC, the active metabolite generated via first-pass-metabolism of THC, demonstrates different binding profile at TRP channels	Potential relevance to sleep induction (e.g., increased adenosine levels) and increased quality of sleep; Dose-dependent anxiolytic effects, with anxiogenic effects at high doses; Appetite stimulation; Anti-nausea; In combination with CBD, potential efficacy in treatment of spasticity, neuropathic pain and muscle spasticity (see Sativex: THC-containing therapeutic approved in Europe as treatment for Multiple Sclerosis)
2-Arachidonoylglycerol (2-AG)	Partial agonist at CB1 (e.g., on lysosomal surface, increasing lysosomal integrity) and CB2; Agonist at GPR55, GPR18, GPR119, PPAR, and robust activation at TRPV4	Anti-oxidative properties; Increased lysosomal stability & integrity; Attenuation of mitochondrial damage during cell stress
Anandamide (AEA)	Agonist at GPR18, GPR119, and PPAR, with robust activation at TRPV4, and very high efficacy at TRPA1; Potent partial agonist at GPR55; Low-affinity full agonist at TRPV1, with similar but less potent affinity as compared to capsaicin; Antagonist at TRPM8	Anti-oxidative properties

==== Neurotransmitter interactions ====
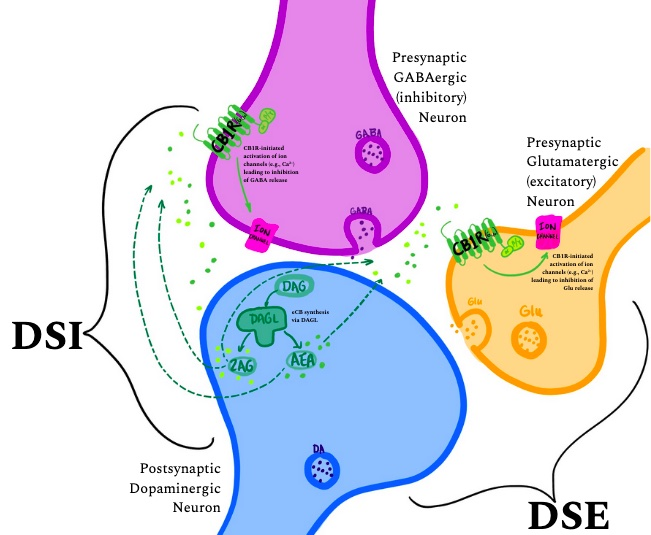
In the brain, the canonical mechanism of CB1 receptor activation is a form of short-term synaptic plasticity initiated via retrograde signaling of endogenous CB1 agonists such as 2AG or AEA (two primary endocannabinoids).

In the brain, the canonical mechanism of CB1 receptor activation is a form of short-term synaptic plasticity initiated via retrograde signaling of endogenous CB1 agonists such as 2AG or AEA (two primary endocannabinoids). This mechanism of action is called depolarization-induced suppression of inhibition (DSI) or depolarization-induced suppression of excitation (DSE), depending on the classification of the presynaptic neuron acted upon by the retrograde messenger (see diagram at left). In the case of CB1R agonism on the presynaptic membrane of a GABAergic interneuron, activation leads to a net effect of increased activity, while the same activity on a glutamatergic neuron leads to the opposite net effect. The release of other neurotransmitters is also modulated in this way, particularly dopamine, dynorphin, oxytocin, and vasopressin.

=== Pharmacokinetics ===
When administered orally, CBN demonstrates a similar metabolism to Δ^{9}-THC, with the primary intoxicating metabolite being produced through a hydroxylation reaction that occurs in the liver. The active metabolite generated via this process is called 11-OH-CBN, which is around two times as potent as CBN, and has demonstrated activity as a weak CB2 antagonist. This metabolism starkly contrasts that of standard cannabis edibles in terms of potency, given that 11-OH-THC has been reported to have 10× the potency of Δ^{9}-THC.

Due to high lipophilicity and first-pass metabolism, there is low bioavailability of CBN and other cannabinoids following oral administration. CBN metabolism is mediated in part by CYP450 isoforms 2C9 and 3A4. The metabolism of CBN may be catalyzed by UGTs (UDP-glucuronosyltransferases), with a subset of UGT isoforms (1A7, 1A8, 1A9, 1A10, 2B7) identified as potential substrates associated with CBN glucuronidation. The bioavailability of CBN following administration via inhalation (e.g., smoking or vaporizing) is approximately 40% that of intravenous administration.

A small study of six cannabis users found a highly variable half life of 32 ± 17 hours upon intravenous administration. Similar to CBD, CBN is metabolized by the CYP2C9 and CYP3A4 liver enzymes and thus the half-life is sensitive to genetic factors that effect the levels of these enzymes.

== Chemistry ==
=== Chemical structure ===
Cannabinoid receptor agonists are categorized into four groups based on chemical structure. CBN, as one of the many phytocannabinoids derived from Cannabis Sativa L, is considered a classical cannabinoid. Other examples of compounds in this group include dibenzopyran derivatives such as Δ^{9}-THC, well-known for underlying the subjective "high" experienced by cannabis users, as well as Δ^{8}-THC, and their synthetic analogs. In contrast, endogenously produced cannabinoids (i.e., endocannabinoids), which also exert effects through CB agonism, are considered eicosanoids, distinguished by notable differences in chemical structure.

Compared to Δ^{9}-THC, one additional aromatic ring confers CBN with a slower and more limited metabolic profile (see § CBN Formation & Metabolism). In contrast to THC, CBN has no double bond isomers nor stereoisomers. CBN can degrade into HU-345 from exposure to air and light. In the case of oral administration of CBN, first-pass metabolism in the liver involves the addition of a hydroxyl group at C9 or C11, increasing the affinity and specificity of CBN for both CB1 and CB2 receptors (see 11-OH-CBN).

== History ==
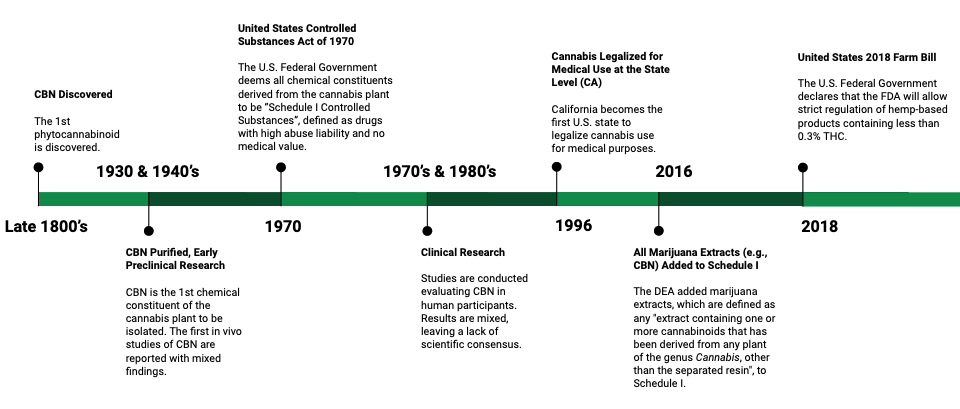
This timeline represents a simplified history of CBN with an emphasis on the complexity surrounding cannabis legislation in the US.

CBN was the first cannabinoid to be isolated from cannabis extract in the late 1800s. Specifically, it was discovered by Barlow Wood, Newton Spivey, and Easterfield in 1896. In the early 1930s, CBN's structure was identified by Cahn, marking the first development of a cannabis extract. Its structure and chemical synthesis were achieved by 1940, followed by some of the first preclinical research studies to determine the effects of individual cannabis-derived compounds in vivo.

== Society and culture ==
=== Legal status ===
CBN is not listed in the schedules set out by the United Nations' Single Convention on Narcotic Drugs from 1961 nor their Convention on Psychotropic Substances from 1971, so the signatory countries to these international drug control treaties are not required by these treaties to control CBN.

==== United States ====
According to the 2018 Farm Bill, extracts from the Cannabis sativa L. plant, including CBN, are legal under US federal law as long as they have a delta-9 Tetrahydrocannabinol (THC) concentration of 0.3% or less.

== Biosynthesis ==
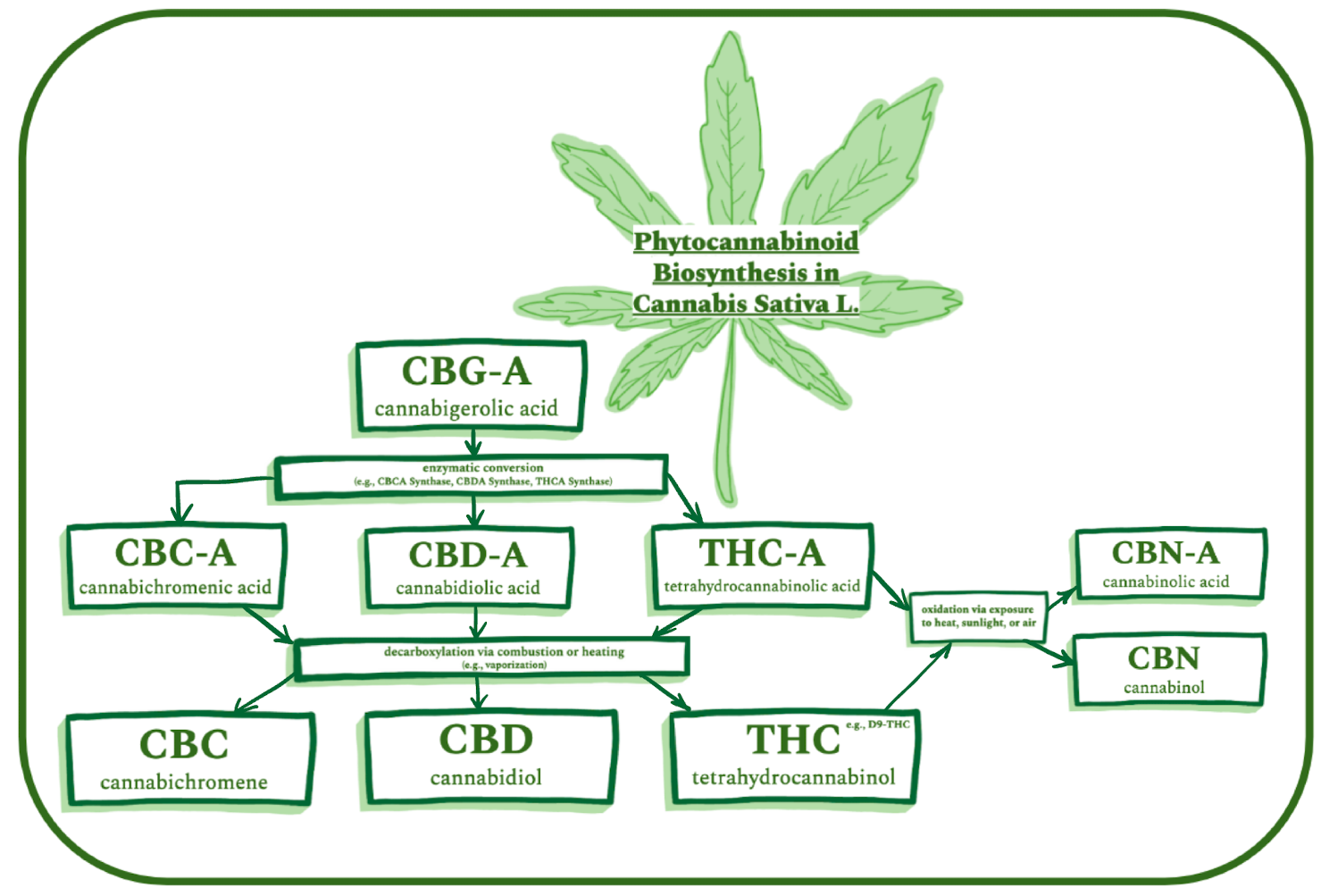
This diagram represents the biosynthetic and metabolic pathways by which phytocannabinoids (e.g., CBD, THC, CBN) are created in the cannabis plant. Starting with CBG-A, the acidic forms of certain phytocannabinoids are generated via enzymatic conversion. From there, decarboxylation (i.e., catalyzed by combustion or heat) yields the most well-known metabolites present in the cannabis plant. CBN is unique in that it does not arise from a pre-existing acidic form, but rather is generated through the oxidation of THC.

This diagram represents the biosynthetic and metabolic pathways by which phytocannabinoids (e.g., CBD, THC, CBN) are created in the cannabis plant. Starting with CBG-A, the acidic forms of certain phytocannabinoids are generated via enzymatic conversion. From there, decarboxylation (i.e., catalyzed by combustion or heat) yields the most well-known metabolites present in the cannabis plant. CBN is unique in that it does not arise from a pre-existing acidic form, but rather is generated through the oxidation of THC.

CBN is unique among phytocannabinoids in that its biosynthetic pathway involves conversion directly from Δ^{9}-THC, rather than from an acidic precursor form of CBN (e.g., Δ^{9}-THC arises through decarboxylation of THC-A). CBN can be found in trace amounts in the Cannabis plant, found mostly in cannabis that is aged and stored, allowing for CBN formation through the oxidation of the cannabis plant's main psychoactive and intoxicating chemical, tetrahydrocannabinol (THC). This process of oxidation occurs via exposure to heat, oxygen, and/or light. Although reports are limited, CBN-A has also been measured at very low levels in the cannabis plant, thought to have formed via hydrolyzation of THC-A (see Phytocannabinoid Biosynthesis diagram, below).
