= C26H37NO2 =

The molecular formula C_{26}H_{37}NO_{2} (molar mass: 395.58 g/mol, exact mass: 395.2824 u) may refer to:

- A-40174 (SP-1)
- AM404, or N-arachidonoylphenolamine
