= Nabitan =

Synthetic cannabinoid

Clinical data
- Other names: Nabutam, benzopyranoperidine, SP-106, Abbott 40656
- Drug class: Cannabinoid
- ATC code: none

Identifiers
- IUPAC name: 5,5-Dimethyl-8-(3-methyloctan-2-yl)-2-(prop-2-yn-1-yl)-1,3,4,5-tetrahydro-2H-[1]benzopyrano[4,3-c]pyridin-10-yl 4-(piperidin-1-yl)butanoate
- CAS Number: 66556-74-9
- PubChem CID: 39503
- ChemSpider: 36117
- UNII: JO7BOR6B3O
- CompTox Dashboard (EPA): DTXSID40867230

Chemical and physical data
- Formula: C_{35}H_{52}N_{2}O_{3}
- Molar mass: 548.812 g·mol^{−1}
- 3D model (JSmol): Interactive image
- SMILES: O=C(Oc2cc(cc1OC(C\3=C(/c12)CN(CC/3)CC#C)(C)C)C(C)C(C)CCCCC)CCCN4CCCCC4
- InChI: InChI=1S/C35H52N2O3/c1-7-9-11-15-26(3)27(4)28-23-31(39-33(38)16-14-21-36-19-12-10-13-20-36)34-29-25-37(18-8-2)22-17-30(29)35(5,6)40-32(34)24-28/h2,23-24,26-27H,7,9-22,25H2,1,3-6H3; Key:MCVPMHDADNVRKF-UHFFFAOYSA-N

Nabitan (nabutam, benzopyranoperidine, SP-106, Abbott 40656) is a synthetic cannabinoid analog of dronabinol (Δ^{9}-tetrahydrocannabinol) and dimethylheptylpyran. It exhibits antiemetic and analgesic effects, most likely by binding to and activating the CB_{1} and CB_{2} cannabinoid receptors, and reduced intraocular pressure in animal tests, making it potentially useful in the treatment of glaucoma.

Nabitan has the advantage of being water-soluble, unlike most cannabinoid derivatives, and was researched for potential use as an analgesic or sedative, although it was never developed for clinical use and is not currently used in medicine, as dronabinol or nabilone were felt to be more useful. However, it is sometimes used in research into the potential therapeutic applications of cannabinoids.

== See also ==
- A-40174 (SP-1)
- A-41988
- Dimethylheptylpyran
- Menabitan
