= 8,11-Dihydroxytetrahydrocannabinol =

Chemical compound

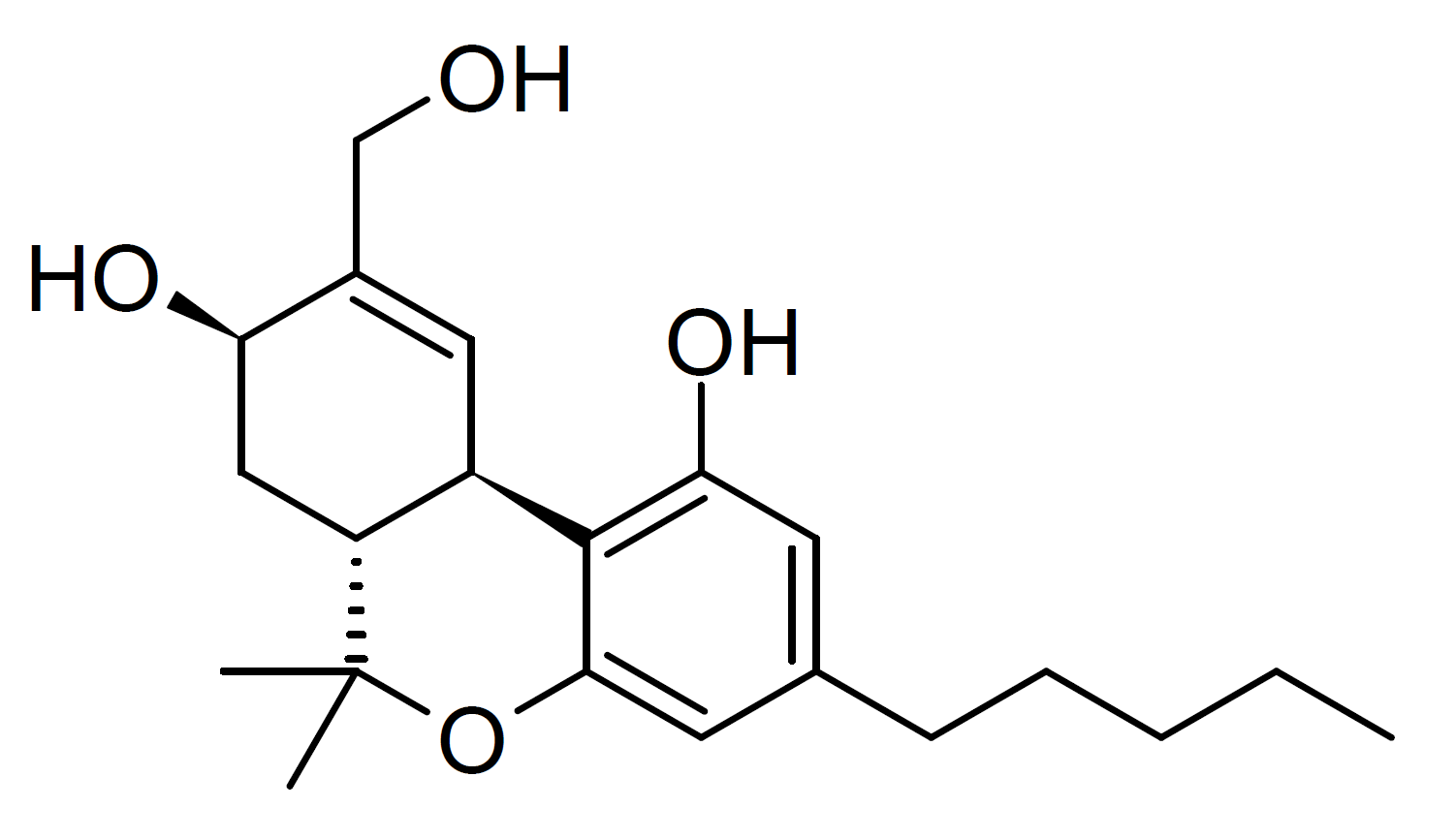

Identifiers
- IUPAC name: (6aR,8R,10aR)-9-(Hydroxymethyl)-6,6-dimethyl-3-pentyl-6a,7,8,10a-tetrahydrobenzo[c]chromene-1,8-diol
- CAS Number: 36913-21-0
- PubChem CID: 101993955
- ChemSpider: 130500
- CompTox Dashboard (EPA): DTXSID80190397

Chemical and physical data
- Formula: C_{21}H_{30}O_{4}
- Molar mass: 346.467 g·mol^{−1}
- 3D model (JSmol): Interactive image
- SMILES: CCCCCc1cc2OC(C)(C)[C@@H]3C[C@@H](O)C(=C[C@H]3c2c(O)c1)CO
- InChI: InChI=1S/C21H30O4/c1-4-5-6-7-13-8-18(24)20-15-10-14(12-22)17(23)11-16(15)21(2,3)25-19(20)9-13/h8-10,15-17,22-24H,4-7,11-12H2,1-3H3/t15-,16-,17-/m1/s1; Key:XTDYIISRNODHHT-BRWVUGGUSA-N

8,11-Dihydroxytetrahydrocannabinol (8β,11-diOH-Δ^{9}-THC) is an active metabolite of THC, the main active component of cannabis. The 8β enantiomer retains psychoactive effects in animal studies with only slightly lower potency than THC, while the 8α enantiomer is much weaker. Both enantiomers have a shorter half-life in the body than 11-hydroxy-THC, making 8,11-dihydroxy-THC potentially useful for drug testing to distinguish between recent cannabis use and use longer in the past.

== See also ==
- 3'-Hydroxy-THC
- 7-Hydroxycannabidiol
- 11-Hydroxy-Delta-8-THC
- 11-Nor-9-carboxy-THC
- Cannabitriol
- Cannabiripsol
