= Robert Sidney Cahn =

British chemist (1899–1981)

Robert Sidney Cahn (9 June 1899 – 15 September 1981) was a British chemist, best known for his contributions to chemical nomenclature and stereochemistry, particularly by the Cahn–Ingold–Prelog priority rules, which he proposed in 1956 with Christopher Kelk Ingold and Vladimir Prelog. Cahn was the first to report the structure of Cannabinol (CBN) found in Cannabis in the early 1930s.

Cahn was the elder son of Gottfried Cahn of Hampstead (where he was born) and Lilian Julie (née Montague) of New Zealand. He attended Westminster School and was elected to Trinity College, Cambridge in July 1918, where he took the Natural Science Tripos. He was awarded his BA in 1921 and MA in 1925.

He became a fellow of the Royal Institute of Chemistry and was editor of the Journal of the Chemical Society from 1949 until 1963, and he remained with the society as director of publications research until his retirement in 1965.

== Private life ==
Robert Cahn married Margaret Joan Emery in Ware, Hertfordshire in 1926. They had one child: Elizabeth Gwen. He then married Frances Mary G Richardson in Pancras in 1936.

Robert Sidney Cahn died at 1 Elsaw Court, Cawley Road, Chichester on 15 September 1981.

== Bibliography ==
- Robert S. Cahn (1959). An Introduction to Chemical Nomenclature. Butterworths. and subsequent editions published in 1964, 1968, and 1974.
