= 3'-Hydroxy-THC =

Minor metabolite of THC

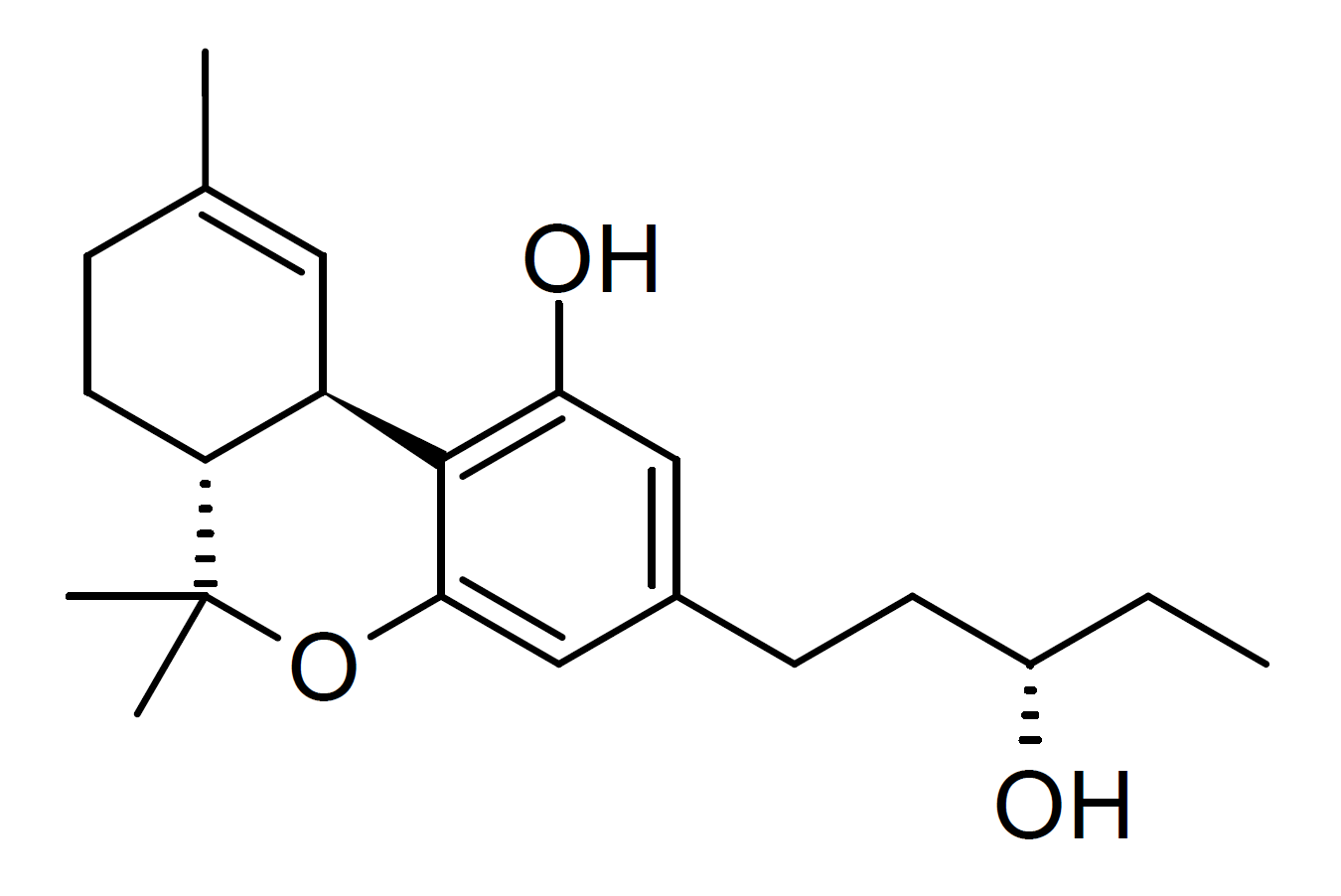

Identifiers
- IUPAC name: (6aR,10aR)-3-[(3S)-3-hydroxypentyl]-6,6,9-trimethyl-6a,7,8,10a-tetrahydrobenzo[c]chromen-1-ol
- CAS Number: 93246-26-5
- PubChem CID: 101594562
- ChemSpider: 23130105

Chemical and physical data
- Formula: C_{21}H_{30}O_{3}
- Molar mass: 330.468 g·mol^{−1}
- 3D model (JSmol): Interactive image
- SMILES: CC[C@H](O)CCc1cc2OC(C)(C)[C@@H]3CCC(C)=C[C@H]3c2c(O)c1
- InChI: InChI=1S/C21H30O3/c1-5-15(22)8-7-14-11-18(23)20-16-10-13(2)6-9-17(16)21(3,4)24-19(20)12-14/h10-12,15-17,22-23H,5-9H2,1-4H3/t15?,16-,17-/m1/s1; Key:GWSPOZKXWMVVEN-YJEKIOLLSA-N

3'-Hydroxy-THC (3'-OH-Δ^{9}-THC) is a minor active metabolite of THC, the main psychoactive component of cannabis. It is one of a number of metabolites of THC hydroxylated on the pentyl side chain, but while the other side-chain hydroxyl isomers are much weaker or inactive, the S enantiomer of 3'-OH-THC is several times more potent than THC itself, and while it is produced in smaller amounts than other active metabolites such as 11-Hydroxy-THC and 8,11-Dihydroxy-THC, it is thought to contribute to the overall pharmacological profile of cannabis.

== See also ==
- 1,2-Didehydro-3-oxo-THCO
- 7-Hydroxycannabidiol
- 11-Hydroxy-Delta-8-THC
- 11-Nor-9-carboxy-THC
