= A-40174 =

Chemical compound

Identifiers
- IUPAC name: 5,5-Dimethyl-8-(3-methyloctan-2-yl)-2-prop-2-ynyl-3,4-dihydro-1H-chromeno[4,3-c]pyridin-10-ol
- CAS Number: 26685-57-4
- PubChem CID: 99040
- ChemSpider: 89464
- UNII: 5HF6EE0TC4
- ChEMBL: ChEMBL66108
- CompTox Dashboard (EPA): DTXSID00949501

Chemical and physical data
- Formula: C_{26}H_{37}NO_{2}
- Molar mass: 395.587 g·mol^{−1}
- 3D model (JSmol): Interactive image
- SMILES: c2c(C(C)(C)CCCCCC)cc(O)c1c2OC(C)(C)C(CC3)=C1CN3CC#C
- InChI: InChI=1S/C26H37NO2/c1-7-9-10-11-18(3)19(4)20-15-23(28)25-21-17-27(13-8-2)14-12-22(21)26(5,6)29-24(25)16-20/h2,15-16,18-19,28H,7,9-14,17H2,1,3-6H3; Key:PNEYWTKVWJBOMD-UHFFFAOYSA-N

A-40174 (SP-1) is an analgesic drug which acts as a potent cannabinoid receptor agonist, and was developed by Abbott Laboratories in the 1970s. It is a structural analog of dronabinol and dimethylheptylpyran.

== See also ==
- A-41988
- Menabitan
