= A-41988 =

Chemical compound

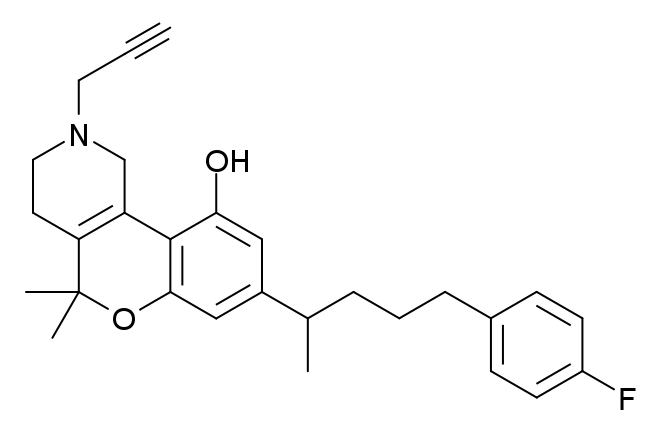

Identifiers
- IUPAC name: 8-[5-(4-Fluorophenyl)pentan-2-yl]-5,5-dimethyl-2-prop-2-ynyl-3,4-dihydro-1H-chromeno[4,3-c]pyridin-10-ol
- CAS Number: 52763-30-1
- PubChem CID: 3085018
- ChemSpider: 2341998
- UNII: 68GDT58M65
- ChEMBL: ChEMBL303312
- CompTox Dashboard (EPA): DTXSID30967213

Chemical and physical data
- Formula: C_{28}H_{32}FNO_{2}
- Molar mass: 433.567 g·mol^{−1}
- 3D model (JSmol): Interactive image
- SMILES: c4cc(F)ccc4CCCC(C)c3cc(O)c1C=2CN(CC#C)CCC=2C(C)(C)Oc1c3
- InChI: InChI=1S/C28H32FNO2/c1-5-14-30-15-13-24-23(18-30)27-25(31)16-21(17-26(27)32-28(24,3)4)19(2)7-6-8-20-9-11-22(29)12-10-20/h1,9-12,16-17,19,31H,6-8,13-15,18H2,2-4H3; Key:UIDOJGIFVOOMLY-UHFFFAOYSA-N

A-41988 (BW29Y) is an analgesic drug which acts as a cannabinoid agonist. It was developed by Abbott Laboratories in the 1970s, and researched for potential use in the treatment of glaucoma, but never commercialised.

== See also ==
- A-40174
- Menabitan
