= 11-Hydroxy-Δ8-THC =

Metabolite of delta-8-THC

11-Hydroxy-Δ^{8}-THC
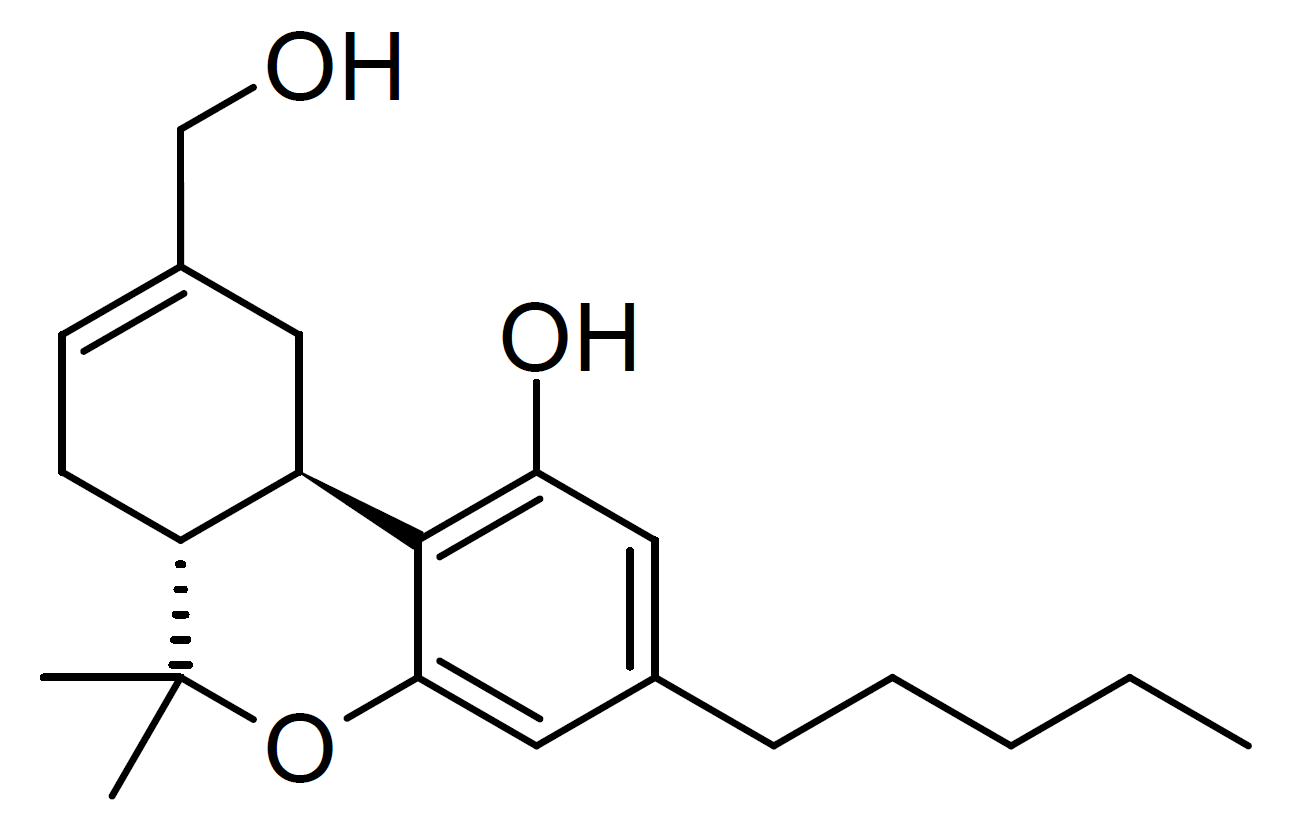

Clinical data
- Other names: 7-OH-Δ^{6}-THC
- Drug class: Cannabinoid
- ATC code: None

Identifiers
- IUPAC name: (6aR,10aR)-9-(hydroxymethyl)-6,6-dimethyl-3-pentyl-6a,7,10,10a-tetrahydrobenzo[c]chromen-1-ol
- CAS Number: 28646-40-4
- PubChem CID: 185651
- ChemSpider: 161395
- UNII: GM4TR07BPX
- CompTox Dashboard (EPA): DTXSID101016542

Chemical and physical data
- Formula: C_{21}H_{30}O_{3}
- Molar mass: 330.468 g·mol^{−1}
- 3D model (JSmol): Interactive image
- SMILES: CCCCCC1=CC(=C2[C@@H]3CC(=CC[C@H]3C(OC2=C1)(C)C)CO)O
- InChI: InChI=1S/C21H30O3/c1-4-5-6-7-14-11-18(23)20-16-10-15(13-22)8-9-17(16)21(2,3)24-19(20)12-14/h8,11-12,16-17,22-23H,4-7,9-10,13H2,1-3H3/t16-,17-/m1/s1; Key:LOUSQMWLMDHRIK-IAGOWNOFSA-N

11-Hydroxy-Δ^{8}-tetrahydrocannabinol (11-hydroxy-Δ^{8}-THC, alternatively numbered as 7-hydroxy-Δ^{6}-THC) is an active metabolite of Δ^{8}-THC, a psychoactive cannabinoid found in small amounts in Cannabis. It is an isomer of 11-OH-Δ^{9}-THC, and is produced via the same metabolic pathway. It was the first cannabinoid metabolite discovered in 1970.

It retains psychoactive effects in animal studies with higher potency than Δ^{8}-THC but lower potency than 11-OH-Δ^{9}-THC. With widespread legal use of semi-synthetic Δ^{8}-THC in certain jurisdictions where Δ^{9}-THC remains illegal, 11-OH-Δ^{8}-THC is now an important metabolite for distinguishing between use of hemp-derived Δ^{8}-THC and natural Δ^{9}-THC.

== See also ==
- 11-Hydroxy-THC
- 11-Hydroxyhexahydrocannabinol
- 3'-Hydroxy-THC
- 7-Hydroxycannabidiol
- 8,11-Dihydroxytetrahydrocannabinol
- 9-OH-HHC
- 11-OH-HHC
- 11-OH-CBN
- 11-Nor-9-carboxy-THC
- Delta-6-Cannabidiol
- Delta-10-Tetrahydrocannabinol
- HU-210
- Delta-11-Tetrahydrocannabinol
