= 11-Nor-9-carboxy-THC =

Main secondary metabolite of THC

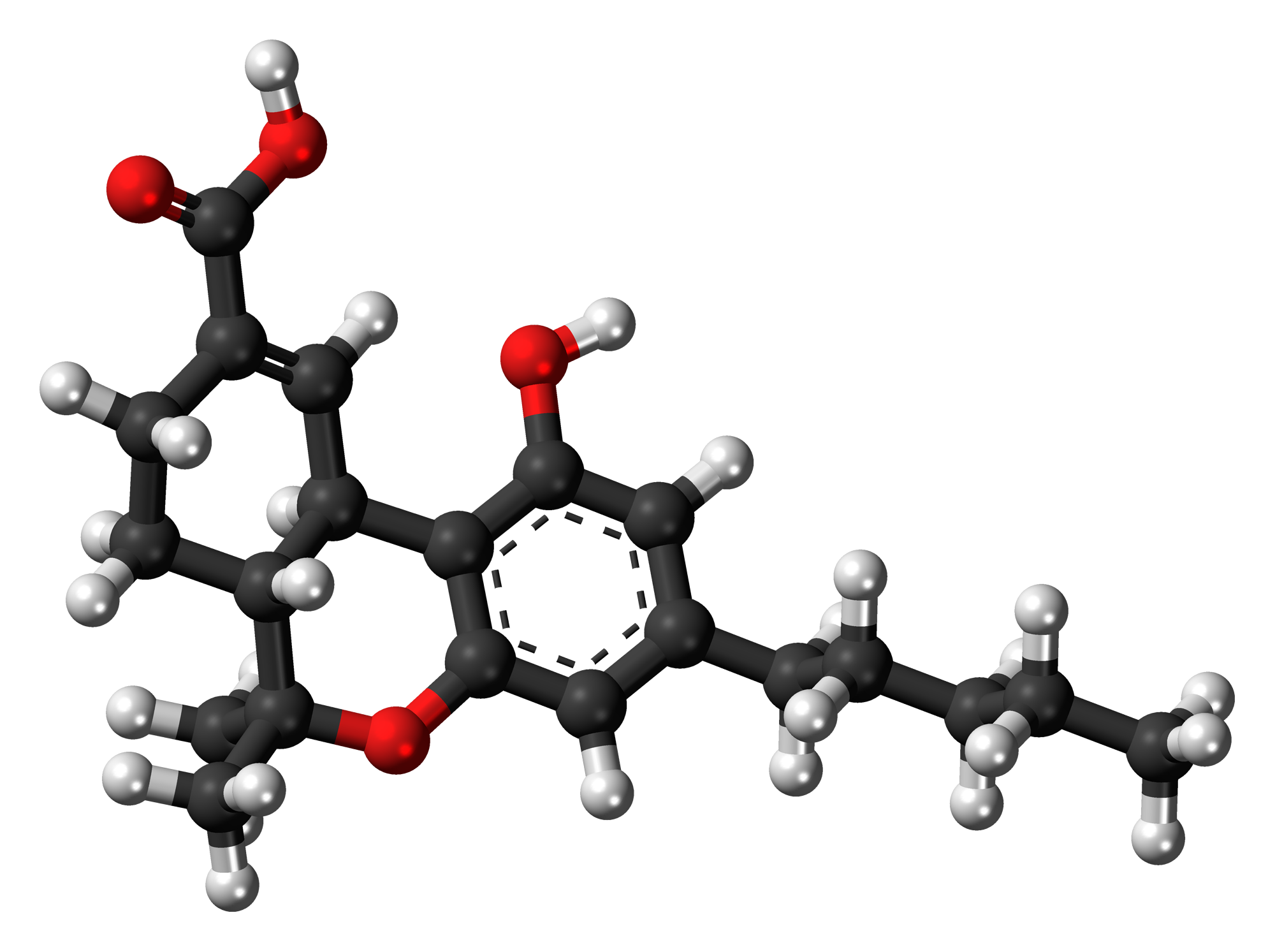

Clinical data
- Pregnancy category: Inconclusive
- Routes of administration: Variable

Pharmacokinetic data
- Bioavailability: Variable
- Metabolism: Variable
- Elimination half-life: 5.2 to 6.2 days
- Excretion: Variable

Identifiers
- IUPAC name: 1-Hydroxy-6,6-dimethyl-3-pentyl-6a,7,8,10a-tetrahydrobenzo[c]chromene-9-carboxylic acid
- CAS Number: 56354-06-4
- PubChem CID: 107885
- ChemSpider: 97019
- UNII: 4TPC9E4A32
- ChEBI: CHEBI:167808
- CompTox Dashboard (EPA): DTXSID8074788

Chemical and physical data
- Formula: C_{21}H_{28}O_{4}
- Molar mass: 344.451 g·mol^{−1}
- 3D model (JSmol): Interactive image
- SMILES: CCCCCc1cc(c2c(c1)OC(C3C2C=C(CC3)C(=O)O)(C)C)O
- InChI: InChI=1S/C21H28O4/c1-4-5-6-7-13-10-17(22)19-15-12-14(20(23)24)8-9-16(15)21(2,3)25-18(19)11-13/h10-12,15-16,22H,4-9H2,1-3H3,(H,23,24); Key:YOVRGSHRZRJTLZ-UHFFFAOYSA-N

11-Nor-9-carboxy-Δ^{9}-tetrahydrocannabinol (11-COOH-THC or THC-COOH), often referred to as 11-nor-9-carboxy-THC or THC-11-oic acid, is the main secondary metabolite of tetrahydrocannabinol (THC) which is formed in the body after cannabis is consumed.

== Metabolism and detection ==
11-COOH-THC is formed in the body by oxidation of the active metabolite 11-hydroxy-THC (11-OH-THC) by liver enzymes. It is then metabolized further by conjugation with glucuronide, forming a water-soluble congener which can be more easily excreted by the body.

11-COOH-THC has a long half-life in the body of up to several days (or even weeks in very heavy users), making it the main metabolite tested for blood or urine testing for cannabis use. More selective tests are able to distinguish between 11-OH-THC and 11-COOH-THC, which can help determine how recently cannabis was consumed; if only 11-COOH-THC is present then cannabis was used some time ago and any impairment in cognitive ability or motor function will have dissipated, whereas if both 11-OH-THC and 11-COOH-THC are present then cannabis was consumed more recently and motor impairment may still be present.

Recent studies highlight that individual factors such as metabolism, body fat percentage, and frequency of use significantly impact the detection window of 11-COOH-THC in drug testing.

Some jurisdictions where cannabis use is decriminalized or permitted under some circumstances use such tests when determining whether drivers were legally intoxicated and therefore unfit to drive, with the comparative levels of THC, 11-OH-THC and 11-COOH-THC being used to derive a "blood cannabis level" analogous to the blood alcohol level used in prosecuting impaired drivers. On the other hand, in jurisdictions where cannabis is completely illegal, any detectable levels of 11-COOH-THC may be deemed to constitute driving while intoxicated, even though this approach has been criticized as tantamount to prohibition of "driving whilst being a recent user of cannabis" regardless of the presence or absence of any actual impairment that might impact driving performance.

== Effects ==
While 11-COOH-THC does not have any psychoactive effects in its own right, it may still have a role in the analgesic and anti-inflammatory effects of cannabis, and has also been shown to moderate the effects of THC itself which may help explain the difference in subjective effects seen between occasional and regular users of cannabis.

== Legal status ==
The legal status of 11-nor-9-carboxy-THC varies among jurisdictions.

=== Australia ===
11-COOH-THC is a Schedule 8 prohibited substance in Western Australia under the Poisons Standard (July 2016). A schedule 8 substance is a controlled Drug – Substances which should be available for use but require restriction of manufacture, supply, distribution, possession and use to reduce abuse, misuse and physical or psychological dependence.

=== United States ===
Because 11-COOH-THC is substantially similar to the Schedule I controlled substance THC, possession or sale of 11-COOH-THC could be subject to prosecution under the Federal Analog Act.

== See also ==
- Lenabasum
- Cannabis drug testing
