= 11-Hydroxy-THC =

Active metabolite of Δ9-THC

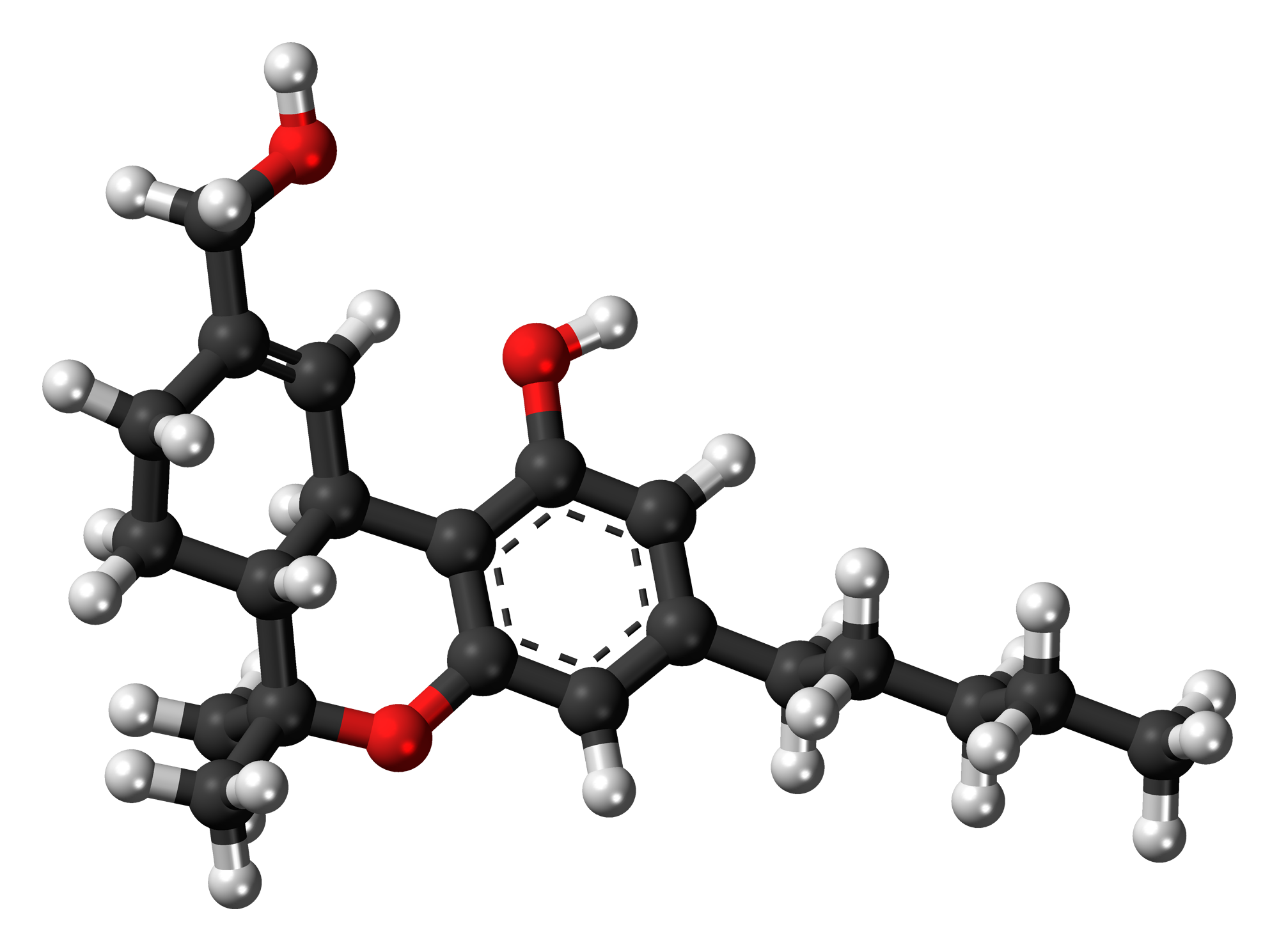

Clinical data
- Other names: 11-OH-Δ9-THC; 7-OH-Δ1-THC; 11-hydroxy-THC
- Drug class: Cannabinoid
- ATC code: None

Legal status
- Legal status: UK: Class B

Identifiers
- IUPAC name: (6aR,10aR)-9-(Hydroxymethyl)-6,6-dimethyl-3-pentyl- 6a,7,8,10a-tetrahydro-6H-benzo[c]chromen-1-ol
- CAS Number: 36557-05-8
- PubChem CID: 37482
- ChemSpider: 34385
- UNII: 9VY04N5SLB
- KEGG: C22778
- CompTox Dashboard (EPA): DTXSID50190061
- ECHA InfoCard: 100.164.583

Chemical and physical data
- Formula: C_{21}H_{30}O_{3}
- Molar mass: 330.468 g·mol^{−1}
- 3D model (JSmol): Interactive image
- SMILES: OC1=C2[C@]3([C@](C(C)(C)OC2=CC(CCCCC)=C1)(CCC(CO)=C3)[H])[H]
- InChI: InChI=1S/C21H30O3/c1-4-5-6-7-14-11-18(23)20-16-10-15(13-22)8-9-17(16)21(2,3)24-19(20)12-14/h10-12,16-17,22-23H,4-9,13H2,1-3H3; Key:YCBKSSAWEUDACY-UHFFFAOYSA-N

11-Hydroxy-Δ^{9}-tetrahydrocannabinol (11-OH-Δ^{9}-THC, alternatively numbered as 7-OH-Δ^{1}-THC), usually referred to as 11-hydroxy-THC within cannabis culture, is the main active metabolite of tetrahydrocannabinol (THC), the major psychoactive substance in cannabis.

After cannabis consumption, THC is metabolized inside the body by cytochrome P450 enzymes such as CYP2C9 and CYP3A4 into 11-hydroxy-THC and then further metabolized by dehydrogenase and CYP2C9 enzymes to form 11-nor-9-carboxy-THC (THC-COOH), which is inactive at the CB_{1} receptors; and further glucuronidated to form 11-nor-Δ^{9}-tetrahydrocannabinol-9-carboxylic acid glucuronide (Δ^{9}-THC-COOH-glu) in the liver, from where it is subsequently excreted through feces and urine. Both metabolites can be assayed in drug tests.

11-hydroxy-THC is formed after human consumption of THC containing products regardless of administration route, although levels of 11-hydroxy-THC are typically higher when cannabis products are eaten instead of inhaled.

== Pharmacology ==
Like Δ^{9}-THC, 11-hydroxy-THC is a partial agonist at the cannabinoid receptor CB_{1}, but with significantly higher binding affinity (K_{i} = 0.37 nM compared to Δ^{9}-THC K_{i} = 35 nM). With respect to cAMP inhibition at CB_{1} it displays a similar potency to that of Δ^{9}-THC (EC_{50} = 11 nM vs. EC_{50} = 5.2 nM, respectively), but a lower maximum response, i.e., efficacy (E_{max} = 28% vs. E_{max} = 70%).

== Research ==
In an in vitro analysis by the University of Rhode Island on cannabinoids it was found that 11-OH-Δ^{9}-THC had the 3rd highest 3C-like protease inhibitor activity against COVID-19 out of all the cannabinoids tested within that study but not as high as the antiviral drug GC376 (56% for 11-OH-Δ^{9}-THC vs. 100% for GC376).

== See also ==
- 11-Hydroxy-Delta-8-THC
- 11-Hydroxyhexahydrocannabinol
- 3'-Hydroxy-THC
- 7-Hydroxycannabidiol
- 10-Hydroxy-THC
- 8,11-Dihydroxytetrahydrocannabinol
- 11-Hydroxycannabinol
- Cannabis edible
- Delta-11-Tetrahydrocannabinol
