= Tetrahydrocannabinol =

Psychoactive component of cannabis

Tetrahydrocannabinol INN: Dronabinol

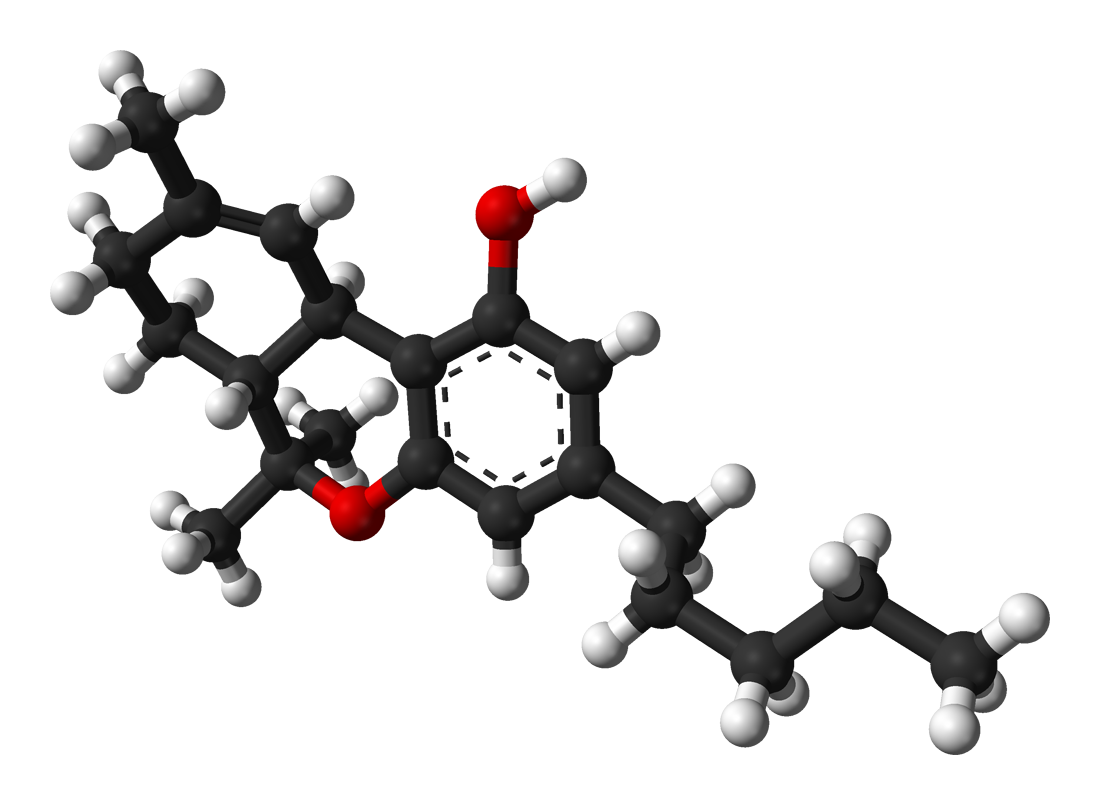

Clinical data
- Trade names: Marinol, Syndros
- Other names: (6aR,10aR)-delta-9-Tetrahydrocannabinol; (−)-trans-Δ^{9}-tetrahydrocannabinol
- License data: US FDA: Dronabinol
- Dependence liability: Physical: Low; Psychological: moderate
- Addiction liability: Moderate
- Routes of administration: By mouth, transdermal, sublingual, inhalation
- Drug class: Cannabinoid
- ATC code: A04AD10 (WHO)

Legal status
- Legal status: AU: Unscheduled: ACT, Schedule 8 (Controlled Drug); BR: Dronabinol: A3; THC <30mg/ml: A3; others: F2 (prohibited).; CA: Unscheduled; DE: Dronabinol: Anlage III, Δ^{9}-THC: II, other isomers and their stereochemical variants: I. (Does not apply to THC as part of cannabis, which is regulated separately, see Cannabis (drug)); NZ: Class B1; UK: Class B; US: Schedule II as Syndros, Schedule III as Marinol, Schedule III for state-licensed medical cannabis, Schedule I as Δ^{9}-THC in pure form (recreational use); UN: Psychotropic Schedule I /II; SE: Förteckning II (Unscheduled when EU-approved industrial hemp <0.3% THC); In general: Rx only

Pharmacokinetic data
- Bioavailability: Oral: 6–20%; Inhalation: 10–35%
- Protein binding: 97–99%
- Metabolism: Mostly hepatic by CYP2C
- Metabolites: 11-OH-delta-9-THC, and others
- Onset of action: Inhalation: Within seconds to minutes
- Elimination half-life: 1.6–59 hours, 25–36 hours (orally administered dronabinol)
- Duration of action: Oral: 4–10 hours Inhalation: 2–4 hours
- Excretion: 65–80% (feces); 20–35% (urine) as acid metabolites

Identifiers
- IUPAC name: (6aR,10aR)-6,6,9-Trimethyl-3-pentyl-6a,7,8,10a-tetrahydro-6H-benzo[c]chromen-1-ol
- CAS Number: 1972-08-3
- PubChem CID: 16078
- IUPHAR/BPS: 2424
- DrugBank: DB00470
- ChemSpider: 15266
- UNII: 7J8897W37S
- KEGG: D00306
- ChEBI: CHEBI:66964
- ChEMBL: ChEMBL465
- CompTox Dashboard (EPA): DTXSID6021327
- ECHA InfoCard: 100.153.676

Chemical and physical data
- Formula: C_{21}H_{30}O_{2}
- Molar mass: 314.469 g·mol^{−1}
- 3D model (JSmol): Interactive image
- Specific rotation: −152° (ethanol)
- Boiling point: 155–157 °C (311–315 °F) 0.05mmHg, 157–160°C @ 0.05mmHg
- Solubility in water: 0.0028 mg/mL (23 °C)
- SMILES: CCCCCc1cc(c2c(c1)OC([C@H]3[C@H]2C=C(CC3)C)(C)C)O
- InChI: InChI=1S/C21H30O2/c1-5-6-7-8-15-12-18(22)20-16-11-14(2)9-10-17(16)21(3,4)23-19(20)13-15/h11-13,16-17,22H,5-10H2,1-4H3/t16-,17-/m1/s1; Key:CYQFCXCEBYINGO-IAGOWNOFSA-N

Tetrahydrocannabinol (THC) is a cannabinoid found in cannabis. It is the principal psychoactive constituent of Cannabis and one of at least 113 total cannabinoids identified on the plant. Although the chemical formula for THC (C_{21}H_{30}O_{2}) describes multiple isomers, the term THC usually refers to the delta-9-THC isomer with chemical name (−)-trans-Δ^{9}-tetrahydrocannabinol.

THC, also known pharmaceutically as dronabinol, is used medically to relieve chemotherapy-induced nausea and HIV/AIDS-related anorexia. Nabiximols, a botanical drug which contains THC, is used medically to treat symptoms of multiple sclerosis, including spasticity and neuropathic pain. THC acts as a partial agonist at CB_{1} and CB_{2} cannabinoid receptors.

THC can be administered orally, inhaled, or transdermally, with bioavailability and onset varying by route, and is extensively metabolized in the liver to active and inactive metabolites before being excreted in feces and urine. Side effects include red eyes, dry mouth, drowsiness, memory impairment, anxiety, and, with chronic use, cannabinoid hyperemesis syndrome. While human overdose is rare, THC can interact with other drugs and has a complex pharmacokinetic profile.

== Uses ==
=== Recreational ===
THC is widely used as a recreational drug, both by itself or with other cannabinoids like cannabidiol (CBD) or in the form of cannabis. It is the main psychoactive constituent in cannabis. The effects of THC include euphoria, appetite stimulation, sedation, cognitive and memory impairment, pain relief, anxiety, and reduced body temperature.

THC can produce strong hallucinogenic effects, mystical experiences, and psychosis-like reactions at high doses in a subset of individuals. These hallucinogenic effects are distinct from but potentially just as strong as or even stronger than those of other hallucinogens like serotonergic psychedelics, dissociatives, and salvia. Besides the hallucinogenic effects, high doses of THC can also produce effects including anxiety, panic, paranoia, delusions, heavy sedation, and catalepsy. Strong THC exposures and associated hallucinogenic and aversive effects have been especially associated with cannabis edibles.

=== Medical ===
THC, referred to as dronabinol in the pharmaceutical context, is approved in the United States as a capsule or solution to relieve chemotherapy-induced nausea and vomiting and HIV/AIDS-induced anorexia.

THC is an active ingredient in nabiximols (Sativex), a specific extract of Cannabis that was approved as a botanical drug in the United Kingdom in 2010 as a mouth spray for people with multiple sclerosis to alleviate neuropathic pain, spasticity, overactive bladder, and other symptoms. Nabiximols (as Sativex) is available as a prescription drug in Canada. In 2021, nabiximols was approved for medical use in Ukraine.

THC is sometimes prescribed off-label to treat glaucoma, Crohn's disease, and post-traumatic stress disorder (PTSD).

== Side effects ==
Side effects of THC can include red eyes, dry mouth, drowsiness, short-term memory impairment, difficulty concentrating, ataxia, increased appetite, anxiety, paranoia, psychosis (i.e., hallucinations, delusions), decreased motivation, and time dilation, among others.

Chronic usage of THC may result in cannabinoid hyperemesis syndrome (CHS), a condition characterized by cyclic nausea, vomiting, and abdominal pain that may persist for months to years after discontinuation.

== Overdose ==
The median lethal dose of THC in humans is not fully known as there is conflicting evidence. A 1972 study gave up to 90 mg/kg of THC to dogs and monkeys without any lethal effects. Some rats died within 72 hours after a dose of up to 36 mg/kg. A 2014 case study based on the toxicology reports and relative testimony in two separate cases gave the median lethal dose in humans at 30 mg/kg (2.1 grams THC for a person who weighs 70 kg; 154 lb; 11 stone), observing cardiovascular death in the one otherwise healthy subject of the two cases studied. A different 1972 study gave the median lethal dose for intravenous THC in mice and rats at 30–40 mg/kg. A 2020 fact sheet published by the US Drug Enforcement Administration stated that "no deaths from overdose of marijuana have been reported."

== Interactions ==
Formal drug–drug interaction studies with THC have not been conducted and are limited. The elimination half-life of pentobarbital, a barbiturate, has been found to increase by four hours when concomitantly administered with oral THC.

== Pharmacology ==
=== Mechanism of action ===
The actions of Δ^{9}-THC result from its partial agonist activity at the cannabinoid receptor CB_{1} (K_{i} = 40.7 nM), located mainly in the central nervous system, and the CB_{2} receptor (K_{i} = 36 nM), mainly expressed in cells of the immune system. The psychoactive effects of THC are primarily mediated by the activation of (mostly G-coupled) cannabinoid receptors, which result in a decrease in the concentration of the second messenger molecule cAMP through inhibition of adenylate cyclase. The presence of these specialized cannabinoid receptors in the brain led researchers to the discovery of endocannabinoids, such as anandamide and 2-arachidonoyl glyceride (2-AG).

THC is a lipophilic molecule and may bind non-specifically to a variety of entities in the brain and body, such as adipose tissue (fat). THC, as well as other cannabinoids that contain a phenol group, possess mild antioxidant activity sufficient to protect neurons against oxidative stress, such as that produced by glutamate-induced excitotoxicity.

THC targets receptors in a manner far less selective than endocannabinoid molecules released during retrograde signaling, as the drug has a relatively low cannabinoid receptor affinity. THC is also limited in its efficacy compared to other cannabinoids due to its partial agonistic activity, as THC appears to result in greater downregulation of cannabinoid receptors than endocannabinoids. Furthermore, in populations of low cannabinoid receptor density, THC may even act to antagonize endogenous agonists that possess greater receptor efficacy. However while THC's pharmacodynamic tolerance may limit the maximal effects of certain drugs, evidence suggests that this tolerance mitigates undesirable effects, thus enhancing the drug's therapeutic window.

Recently, it has been shown that THC is also a partial autotaxin inhibitor, with an apparent IC_{50} of 407 ± 67 nM for the ATX-gamma isoform. THC was also co-crystallized with autotaxin, deciphering the binding interface of the complex. These results might explain some of the effects of THC on inflammation and neurological diseases, since autotaxin is responsible for LPA generation, a key lipid mediator involved in numerous diseases and physiological processes. However, clinical trials need to be performed in order to assess the importance of ATX inhibition by THC during medicinal cannabis consumption.

=== Pharmacokinetics ===
==== Absorption ====
With oral administration of a single dose, THC is almost completely absorbed by the gastrointestinal tract. However, due to first-pass metabolism in the liver and the high lipid solubility of THC, only about 5 to 20% reaches circulation. Following oral administration, concentrations of THC and its major active metabolite 11-hydroxy-THC (11-OH-THC) peak after 0.5 to 4 hours, with median time to peak of 1.0 to 2.5 hours at different doses. In some cases, peak levels may not occur for as long as 6 hours. Concentrations of THC and 11-hydroxy-THC in the circulation are approximately equal with oral administration. There is a slight increase in dose proportionality in terms of peak and area-under-the-curve levels of THC with increasing oral doses over a range of 2.5 to 10 mg. A high-fat meal delays time to peak concentrations of oral THC by 4 hours on average and increases area-under-the-curve exposure by 2.9-fold, but peak concentrations are not significantly altered. A high-fat meal additionally increases absorption of THC via the lymphatic system and allows it to bypass first-pass metabolism. Consequently, a high-fat meal increases levels of 11-hydroxy-THC by only 25% and most of the increase in bioavailability is due to increased levels of THC.

The bioavailability of THC when smoking or inhaling is approximately 25%, with a range of 2% to 56% (although most commonly between 10–35%). The large range and marked variability between individuals is due to variation in factors including product matrix, ignition temperature, and inhalational dynamics (e.g., number, duration, and intervals of inhalations, breath hold time, depth and volume of inhalations, size of inhaled particles, deposition site in the lungs). THC is detectable within seconds with inhalation and peak levels of THC occur after 3 to 10 minutes. Smoking or inhaling THC results in greater blood levels of THC and its metabolites and a much faster onset of action than oral administration of THC. Inhalation of THC bypasses the first-pass metabolism that occurs with oral administration. The bioavailability of THC with inhalation is increased in heavy users.

Transdermal administration of THC is limited by its extreme water insolubility. Efficient skin transport can only be obtained with permeation enhancement. Transdermal administration of THC, as with inhalation, avoids the first-pass metabolism that occurs with oral administration.

==== Distribution ====
The volume of distribution of THC is large and is approximately 10 L/kg (range 4–14 L/kg), which is due to its high lipid solubility. The plasma protein binding of THC and its metabolites is approximately 95 to 99%, with THC bound mainly to lipoproteins and to a lesser extent albumin. THC is rapidly distributed into well-vascularized organs such as lung, heart, brain, and liver, and is subsequently equilibrated into less vascularized tissue. It is extensively distributed into and sequestered by fat tissue due to its high lipid solubility, from which it is slowly released. THC is able to cross the placenta and is excreted in human breast milk.

==== Metabolism ====
The metabolism of THC occurs mainly in the liver by cytochrome P450 enzymes CYP2C9, CYP2C19, and CYP3A4. CYP2C9 and CYP3A4 are the primary enzymes involving in metabolizing THC. Pharmacogenomic research has found that oral THC exposure is 2- to 3-fold greater in people with genetic variants associated with reduced CYP2C9 function. When taken orally, THC undergoes extensive first-pass metabolism in the liver, primarily via hydroxylation. The principal active metabolite of THC is 11-hydroxy-THC (11-OH-THC), which is formed by CYP2C9 and is psychoactive similarly to THC. This metabolite is further oxidized to 11-nor-9-carboxy-THC (THC-COOH). In animals, more than 100 metabolites of THC could be identified, but 11-OH-THC and THC-COOH are the predominant metabolites.

==== Elimination ====
More than 55% of THC is excreted in the feces and approximately 20% in the urine. The main metabolite in urine is the ester of glucuronic acid and 11-OH-THC and free THC-COOH. In the feces, mainly 11-OH-THC was detected.

Estimates of the elimination half-life of THC are variable. THC was reported to have a fast initial half-life of 6 minutes and a long terminal half-life of 22 hours in a population pharmacokinetic study. Conversely, the Food and Drug Administration label for dronabinol reports an initial half-life of 4 hours and a terminal half-life of 25 to 36 hours. Many studies report an elimination half-life of THC in the range of 20 to 30 hours. 11-Hydroxy-THC appears to have a similar terminal half-life to that of THC, for instance 12 to 36 hours relative to 25 to 36 hours in one study. The elimination half-life of THC is longer in heavy users. This may be due to slow redistribution from deep compartments such as fatty tissues, where THC accumulates with regular use.

== List of related compounds ==
Category	Compound	THC-relationship
Analogs	Dimethylheptylpyran	an analog of THC
Analogs	Levonantradol	an analog of THC
Analogs	Nabilone	a novel synthetic cannabinoid analog (neocannabinoid) that mimics THC.
Analogs	Nabitan	an analog of THC
Analogs	Tinabinol	an analog of THC and dimethylheptylpyran
Derivatives	9-Hydroxyhexahydrocannabinol (9-OH-HHC)	a semi-synthetic derivative of THC
Derivatives	Hexahydrocannabinol (HHC)	a hydrogenated derivative of THC
Derivatives	THC morpholinylbutyrate	a synthetic derivative of THC
Esters	THC hemisuccinate	the hemisuccinate ester of THC that's water soluble and has rectal bioavailability to reach CNS
Esters	THC-O-acetate	the acetate ester of THC
Esters	THC-O-phosphate	a water-soluble organophosphate ester derivative
Homologues	Parahexyl	a homologue of THC
Homologues	Tetrahydrocannabihexol (THCH)	a hexyl homologue of THC
Homologues	Tetrahydrocannabiorcol (THCC)	a homologue of THC and THCV
Homologues	Tetrahydrocannabutol (THCB)	a homologue of THC
Homologues	Tetrahydrocannabiphorol (THCP)	the heptyl homologue of THC
Homologues	Tetrahydrocannabivarin (THCV)	a homologue of THC
Isomers	Cis-THC	an isomer of THC
Isomers	Δ-3-Tetrahydrocannabinol (Delta-3-THC)	a synthetic isomer of THC
Isomers	Δ-4-Tetrahydrocannabinol (Delta-4-THC)	a synthetic isomer of THC
Isomers	Delta-7-Tetrahydrocannabinol	a synthetic isomer of THC
Isomers	Delta-8-Tetrahydrocannabinol	a double bond isomer of THC
Isomers	Delta-10-Tetrahydrocannabinol	a positional isomer of THC
Metabolites	3'-Hydroxy-THC	a minor active metabolite of THC
Metabolites	8,11-Dihydroxytetrahydrocannabinol	an active metabolite of THC
Metabolites	11-Hydroxy-Δ-8-THC	an active metabolite of THC
Metabolites	11-Hydroxy-THC	the main active metabolite of THC
Metabolites	11-Hydroxyhexahydrocannabinol	an active metabolite of THC and a metabolite of the trace cannabinoid hexahydrocannabinol (HHC)
Metabolites	11-Nor-9-carboxy-THC	the main secondary metabolite of THC
Precursor	Tetrahydrocannabinolic acid (THCA)	the biosynthetic precursor for THC
Prodrug	THC-VHS	a synthetic prodrug of THC

== Chemistry ==
THC is a molecule that combines polyketides (derived from acetyl CoA) and terpenoids (derived from isoprenylpyrophosphate). It is hydrophobic with very low solubility in water, but good solubility in many organic solvents. As a phytochemical, THC is assumed to be involved in the plant's evolutionary adaptation against insect predation, ultraviolet light, and environmental stress.

The preparation of THC was reported in JACS in 1965. That procedure called for the intramolecular alkyl lithium attack on a starting carbonyl to form the fused rings, and a tosyl chloride mediated formation of the ether.

=== Biosynthesis ===
In the Cannabis plant, THC occurs mainly as tetrahydrocannabinolic acid (THCA, 2-COOH-THC). Geranyl pyrophosphate and olivetolic acid react, catalysed by an enzyme to produce cannabigerolic acid, which is cyclized by the enzyme THC acid synthase to give THCA. Over time, or when heated, THCA is decarboxylated, producing THC. The pathway for THCA biosynthesis is similar to that which produces the bitter acid humulone in hops. It can also be produced in genetically modified yeast.

Biosynthesis of THC

== History ==
Cannabidiol was isolated and identified from Cannabis sativa in 1940 by Roger Adams who was also the first to document the synthesis of THC (both delta-9-THC and delta-8-THC) from the acid-based cyclization of CBD in 1942. THC was first isolated from Cannabis in 1964.

== Society and culture ==
=== Comparisons with medical cannabis ===
Female cannabis plants contain at least 113 cannabinoids, including cannabidiol (CBD), thought to be the major anticonvulsant that helps people with multiple sclerosis, and cannabichromene (CBC), an anti-inflammatory which may contribute to the pain-killing effect of cannabis.

=== Drug testing ===
THC and its 11-OH-THC and THC-COOH metabolites can be detected and quantified in blood, urine, hair, oral fluid or sweat using a combination of immunoassay and chromatographic techniques as part of a drug use testing program or in a forensic investigation. There is ongoing research to create devices capable of detecting THC in breath.

=== Legal status ===
THC, along with its double bond isomers and their stereoisomers, is one of only three cannabinoids scheduled by the UN Convention on Psychotropic Substances (the other two are dimethylheptylpyran and parahexyl). It was listed under Schedule I in 1971, but reclassified to Schedule II in 1991 following a recommendation from the World Health Organization (WHO). Based on subsequent studies, the WHO has recommended the reclassification to the less-stringent Schedule III. Cannabis as a plant is scheduled by the Single Convention on Narcotic Drugs (Schedule I and IV). It is specifically still listed under Schedule I by US federal law under the Controlled Substances Act for having "no accepted medical use" and "lack of accepted safety". However, dronabinol, a pharmaceutical form of THC, has been approved by the FDA as an appetite stimulant for people with AIDS and an antiemetic for people receiving chemotherapy under the trade names Marinol and Syndros.

In 2003, the WHO Expert Committee on Drug Dependence recommended transferring THC to Schedule IV of the convention, citing its medical uses and low abuse and addiction potential. In 2019, the Committee recommended transferring Δ^{9}-THC to Schedule I of the Single Convention on Narcotic Drugs of 1961, but its recommendations were rejected by the United Nations Commission on Narcotic Drugs.

==== United States ====
As of 2023, 38 states, four territories, and the District of Columbia allow medical use of cannabis (in which THC is the primary psychoactive component), with the exception of Georgia, Idaho, Indiana, Iowa, Kansas, Nebraska, North Carolina, South Carolina, Tennessee, Texas, Wisconsin, and Wyoming. As of 2022, the federal government maintains cannabis as a schedule I controlled substance, while dronabinol is classified as Schedule III in capsule form (Marinol) and Schedule II in liquid oral form (Syndros).

On 18 December 2025, President Donald Trump issued an Executive Order titled "Increasing Medical Marijuana and Cannabidiol Research", directing the DEA and FDA to reclassify medical marijuana. To that end, on 23 April 2026, the Department of Justice issued an order to immediately reclassify medical cannabis as a Schedule III controlled substance when dispensed by state-licensed cannabis dispensaries to individuals with a state issued medical marijuana card. The DEA is in the process of conducting expedited public hearings to address the broader rescheduling of all cannabis from Schedule I to Schedule III, with the hearings scheduled to begin 29 June 2026. This rescheduling makes medical marijuana legal for medicinal use when obtained from licensed dispensaries, and once the broader rescheduling is complete, should allow it to be prescribed by licensed physicians who are also licensed by the DEA to prescribed controlled substances. However, as it is still a controlled substance, diversion for recreational use will still be illegal under federal law.

==== Canada ====
As of October 2018, when recreational use of cannabis was legalized in Canada, some 220 dietary supplements and 19 veterinary health products, containing not more than 10 parts per million of THC extract, were approved with general health claims for treating minor conditions.

== Research ==
In April 2014, the American Academy of Neurology found evidence supporting the effectiveness of the cannabis extracts in treating certain symptoms of multiple sclerosis and pain, but there was insufficient evidence to determine effectiveness for treating several other neurological diseases. A 2015 review confirmed that medical marijuana was effective for treating spasticity and chronic pain, but caused numerous short-lasting adverse events, such as dizziness.

=== Multiple sclerosis symptoms ===
- Spasticity. Based on the results of three high-quality trials and five of lower quality, oral cannabis extract was rated as effective, and THC as probably effective, for improving people's subjective experience of spasticity. Oral cannabis extract and THC both were rated as possibly effective for improving objective measures of spasticity. Nabiximols likely effectively reduces the severity of spasticity in the short‐term.
- Centrally mediated pain and painful spasms. Based on the results of four high-quality trials and four low-quality trials, oral cannabis extract was rated as effective, and THC as probably effective in treating central pain and painful spasms.
- Bladder dysfunction. Based on a single high quality study, oral cannabis extract and THC were rated as probably ineffective for controlling bladder complaints in multiple sclerosis.

=== Neurodegenerative disorders ===
- Huntington disease. No reliable conclusion could be drawn regarding the effectiveness of THC or oral cannabis extract in treating the symptoms of Huntington disease as the available trials were too small to reliably detect any difference
- Parkinson's disease. Based on a single study, oral CBD extract was rated probably ineffective in treating levodopa-induced dyskinesia in Parkinson's disease.
- Alzheimer's disease. A 2009 Cochrane Review found insufficient evidence to conclude whether cannabis products have any utility in the treatment of Alzheimer's disease.

=== Other neurological disorders ===
- Tourette syndrome. The available data was determined to be insufficient to allow reliable conclusions to be drawn regarding the effectiveness of oral cannabis extract or THC in controlling tics.
- Cervical dystonia. Insufficient data was available to assess the effectiveness of oral cannabis extract of THC in treating cervical dystonia.

=== Potential for toxicity ===
Preliminary research indicates that prolonged exposure to high doses of THC may interfere with chromosomal stability, which may be hereditary as a factor affecting cell instability and cancer risk. The carcinogenicity of THC in the studied populations of so-called "heavy users" remains dubious due to various confounding variables, most significantly concurrent tobacco use.

== See also ==
* Cannabinoids
  - Anandamide, 2-Arachidonoylglycerol, endogenous cannabinoid agonists
  - Cannabidiol (CBD)
  - Cannabinol (CBN), a metabolite of THC
  - Delta-8-THC, one of the isomers of THC
  - HU-210, WIN 55,212-2, JWH-133, synthetic cannabinoid agonists (neocannabinoids)
- Cannabis-induced psychotic disorder
- Hashish
- List of investigational analgesics
- Medical cannabis
  - Dronabinol, the name of THC-based pharmaceutical (INN)
  - Epidiolex (prescription form of purified cannabidiol derived from hemp used for treating some rare neurological diseases)
  - Sativex
- Effects of cannabis
- War on drugs
- Vaping-associated pulmonary injury
- Cannabinoid hyperemesis syndrome (CHS)
