= Levonantradol =

Chemical compound

Clinical data
- ATC code: none

Identifiers
- IUPAC name: [(6S,6aR,9R,10aR)- 9-hydroxy- 6-methyl- 3-[(2R)-5-phenylpentan- 2-yl]oxy- 5,6,6a,7,8,9,10,10a-octahydrophenanthridin- 1-yl] acetate
- CAS Number: 71048-87-8
- PubChem CID: 5361881
- ChemSpider: 4514867
- UNII: 03S640ADSK
- CompTox Dashboard (EPA): DTXSID80221271

Chemical and physical data
- Formula: C_{27}H_{35}NO_{4}
- Molar mass: 437.580 g·mol^{−1}
- 3D model (JSmol): Interactive image
- SMILES: O=C(Oc2cc(O[C@H](C)CCCc1ccccc1)cc4c2[C@@H]3C[C@H](O)CC[C@H]3[C@@H](N4)C)C
- InChI: InChI=1S/C27H35NO4/c1-17(8-7-11-20-9-5-4-6-10-20)31-22-15-25-27(26(16-22)32-19(3)29)24-14-21(30)12-13-23(24)18(2)28-25/h4-6,9-10,15-18,21,23-24,28,30H,7-8,11-14H2,1-3H3/t17-,18+,21-,23+,24-/m1/s1; Key:FFVXQGMUHIJQAO-BFKQJKLPSA-N

Levonantradol (CP 50,556-1) is a synthetic cannabinoid analog of dronabinol (Marinol) developed by Pfizer in the 1980s. It is around 30 times more potent than THC, and exhibits antiemetic and analgesic effects via activation of CB_{1} and CB_{2} cannabinoid receptors. Levonantradol is not currently used in medicine as dronabinol or nabilone are felt to be more useful for most conditions, however it is widely used in research into the potential therapeutic applications of cannabinoids.

== Pharmacodynamics ==
Levonantradol is a full CB_{1} receptor agonist. Cannabinoid receptors belong to the superfamily of G-protein coupled receptors (GPCRs), and endogenous cannabinoids naturally activate GPCRs. GPCRs modulate the inhibition of adenylyl cyclase and accumulation of the second messenger, cyclic adenosine monophosphate (cAMP). The CB_{1} receptor is the most common GPCR in the central nervous system. The activation of CB_{1}Rs decrease calcium conductance and increase potassium conductance in the brain. CB signaling naturally modulates synaptic transmission and mediates psychoactivity, and synthetic cannabinoids mimic these same actions. Although the efficacy of Levonantradol is dependent on the level of GCPR activity, Full agonists like Levonantradol have the ability to activate GPCRs and convert G_{α} into a high affinity state for GTP or low affinity state for GDP. Previous studies suggest that Levonantradol has a higher binding affinity and efficacy than other similar synthetic cannabinoids (e.g. Δ^{9}-THC).

== Pharmacokinetics ==
Although Levonantradol has been extensively tested on animals including cats, rodents, and non-human primates. It has also been tested among cancer patient populations in clinical trials. Levonantradol is most commonly administered intramuscularly (I.M.), however it can also be administered orally. The dosage can range from 0.25 mg-3.0 mg every 2–4 hours, and the half-life is 1–2 hours. In order to administer Levonantradol intramuscularly, the drug must be dissolved in 5% ethanol, 5% emulphur, and 90% sterile saline. Synthetic cannabinoids like Levonantradol readily cross the blood–brain barrier because they are highly lipophilic and have low molecular weights. Levonantradol's bioavailability is variable due to the first pass metabolism.

== Treatment ==
Levonantradol has been clinically tested in cancer patients for its pain relief and antiemetic benefits. Cancer patients that endure chemotherapy often develop intense nausea, and Levonantradol has been tested to reduce these emetic symptoms. It is often used instead of THC because it has a higher efficacy. Levonantradol also acts on pain pathways in the central nervous system, which enables the drug to alleviate pain. Studies have shown an absence of emetic side effects within the half-life of the Levonantradol administered. Other studies suggest that cannabinoid agonists can synergize opioid anti-nociception. Cannabinoid receptors are located in nociceptive pathways, and CBs can promote signal transduction in TRP channels. Although Levonantradol relieves nociceptive and postoperative pain, decreases nausea, and improves spasticity in addition to being more effective than placebos, it has yet to be approved as legal medicine. Researchers have concluded that Levonantradol is no more effective than Codeine, which is why they do not recommend expansion into clinical practice.

== Side effects ==
The side effects for Levonantradol include ptosis, sedation, and ataxia in non-human primates. In rodents, the symptoms include dysphoria, memory impairment, motor incoordination, reduced concentration, and disorientation. Levonantradol also decreases startle response. In humans, side effects include dry mouth, drowsiness, dizziness, altered perception, mild sedation, and lack of concentration. It can cause an increase in heart rate and decrease in blood pressure. Euphoric symptoms rarely occurred in subjects.

== Synthesis ==
Nantradol synthesis: asymmetric:

Dane salt formation between 3,5-dimethoxyaniline and ethyl acetoacetate followed by borohydride reduction gives synthon 1. The amino group is protected by rxn with ethyl chloroformate, the ester group is saponified, and then cyclodehydration with polyphosphoric acid leads to the dihydroquinoline ring system (2). Deblocking with HBr is followed by etherification of the nonchelated phenolic hydroxyl gives 3. Treatment with NaH and ethyl formate results in both N-formylation and C-formylation of the active methylene to give 4. Michael addition of methyl vinyl ketone (MVP) followed by successive base treatments to remove the activating C-formyl group and then to complete the Robinson annulation to give 5. Lithium in liquid ammonia reduces the olefinic linkage and successive acetylation and sodium borohydride reductions complete the synthesis of nantradol (6).

== Related compounds ==
Numerous other compounds similar to levonantradol were also developed at the same time, including CP 42,096, CP 47,497, CP 55,940 and CP 55,244. The desacetyl derivative of levonantradol (DALN or CP 54,939) and its N-methyl derivative, as well as the tetracyclic analogue all have similar activity to levonantradol itself.

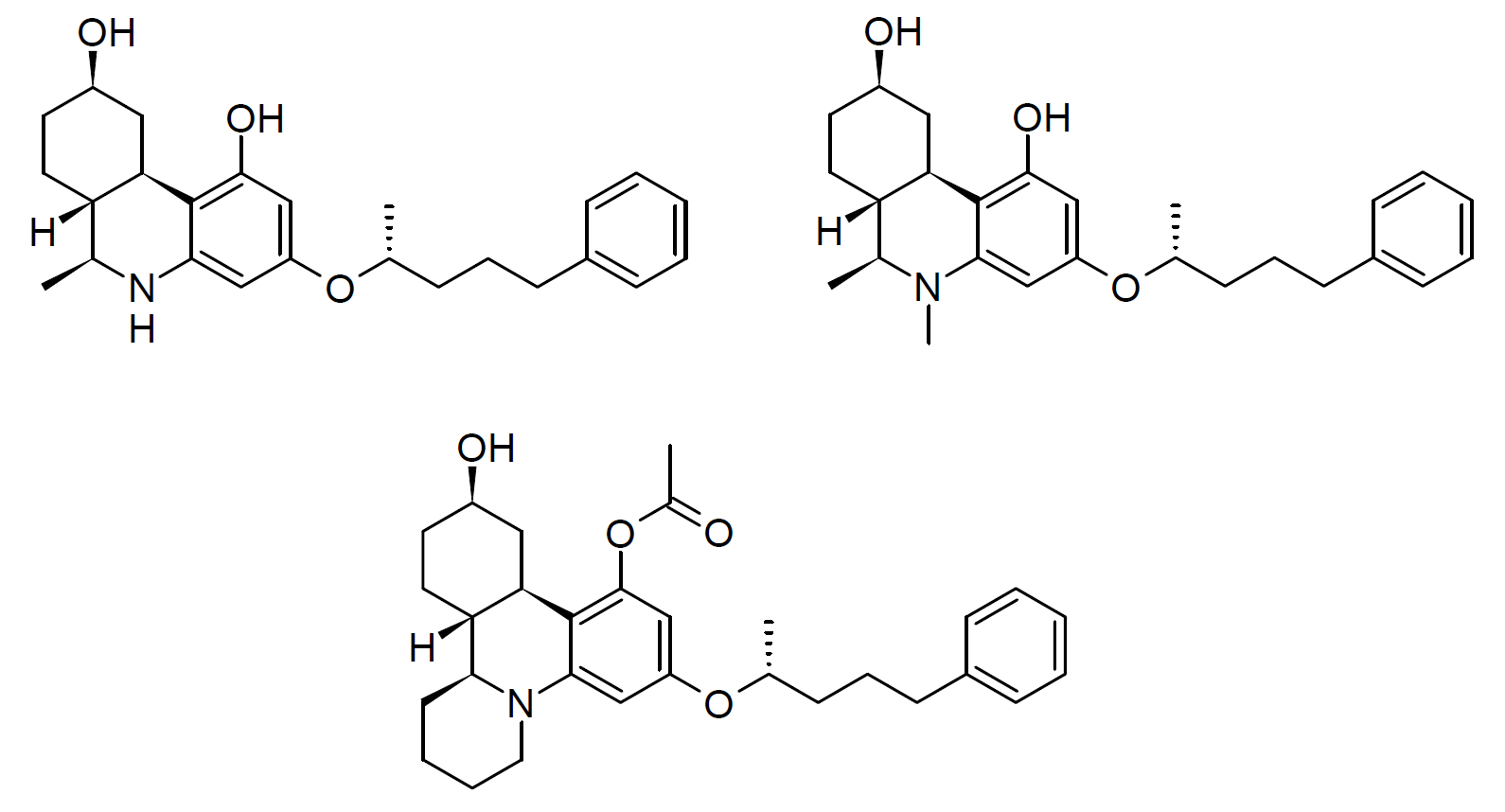
Desacetyllevonantradol, 80286-75-5 (top left), N-methyl-DALN (top right), and tetracyclic derivative (bottom)

== See also ==
- A-41988
- AM-919
- Nonabine
- PSB-SB-1202
