= C23H34O3 =

The molecular formula C_{23}H_{34}O_{3} (molar mass: 358.51 g/mol, exact mass: 358.2508 u) may refer to:

- Abeo-HHC acetate
- AM-905
- AM-906
- HHC-acetate
- Pregnenolone acetate
- Testosterone butyrate, or testosterone butanoate
- Testosterone isobutyrate
