= C22H36O2 =

The molecular formula C_{22}H_{36}O_{2} (molar mass: 332.52 g/mol, exact mass: 332.2715 u) may refer to:

- Docosatetraenoic acid
- Ganaxolone
- Cannabicyclohexanol
- O-1656
