= C23H38O2 =

The molecular formula C_{23}H_{38}O_{2} (molar mass: 346.55 g/mol) may refer to:

- (C9)-CP 47,497
- O-1871
- Rosterolone, or 1α-methyl-17α-propyl-5α-androstan-17β-ol-3-one
