= C24H40O3 =

The molecular formula C_{24}H_{40}O_{3} (molar mass: 376.57 g/mol, exact mass: 376.2977 u) may refer to:

- CP 55,940
- Lithocholic acid (LCA), or 3α-hydroxy-5β-cholan-24-oic acid
- Pantheric acid B
