= CP 42,096 =

Cannabinoid agonist drug

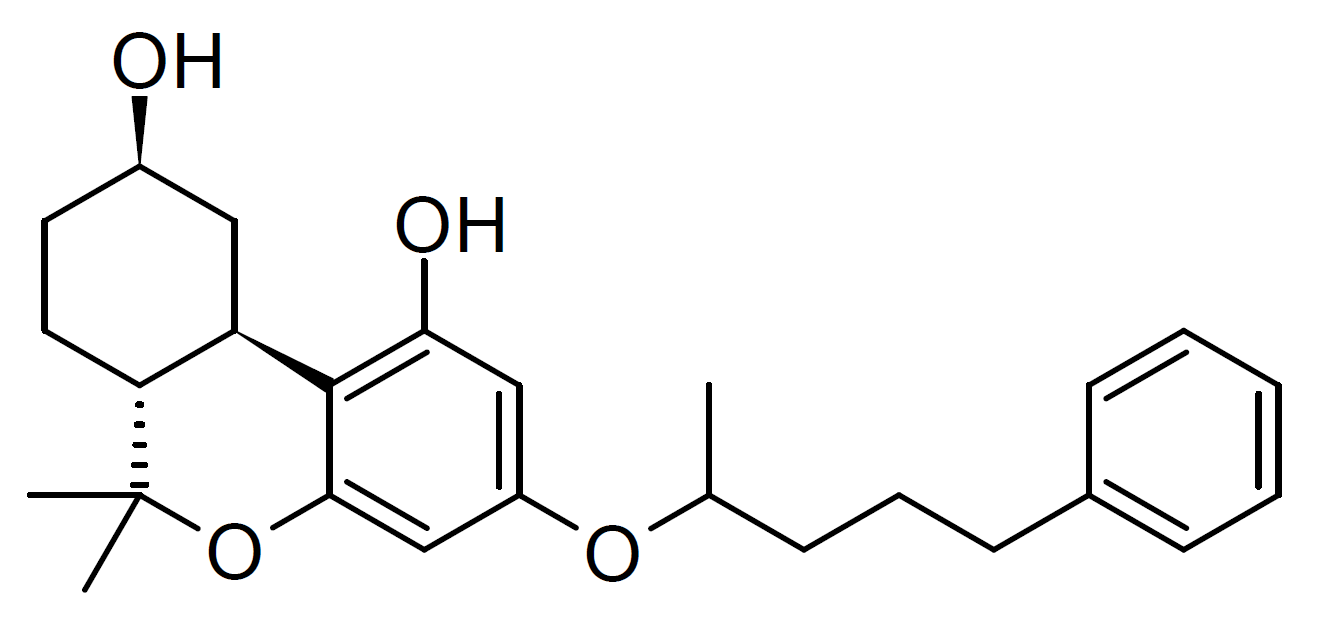

Identifiers
- IUPAC name: (6aR,9R,10aR)-6,6-dimethyl-3-(5-phenylpentan-2-yloxy)-6a,7,8,9,10,10a-hexahydrobenzo[c]chromene-1,9-diol
- CAS Number: 129658-01-1
- PubChem CID: 10070164
- ChemSpider: 8245704

Chemical and physical data
- Formula: C_{26}H_{34}O_{4}
- Molar mass: 410.554 g·mol^{−1}
- 3D model (JSmol): Interactive image
- SMILES: CC(CCCC1=CC=CC=C1)OC2=CC(=C3[C@@H]4C[C@@H](CC[C@H]4C(OC3=C2)(C)C)O)O
- InChI: InChI=1S/C26H34O4/c1-17(8-7-11-18-9-5-4-6-10-18)29-20-15-23(28)25-21-14-19(27)12-13-22(21)26(2,3)30-24(25)16-20/h4-6,9-10,15-17,19,21-22,27-28H,7-8,11-14H2,1-3H3/t17?,19-,21-,22-/m1/s1; Key:YIUCAHIOICYGOA-WNBFYKTCSA-N

CP 42,096 is an analgesic drug which acts as a cannabinoid agonist. It was developed by Pfizer in the 1980s as part of the research that led to the development of levonantradol, and is more potent than THC but less potent than newer compounds such as CP 55,244.

== See also ==
- A-41988
- CP 47,497
- CP 55,940
- Canbisol
- Hexahydrocannabinol
