= C27H35NO4 =

The molecular formula C_{27}H_{35}NO_{4} (molar mass: 437.57 g/mol, exact mass: 437.2566 u) may refer to:

- Alletorphine, or N-allylnoretorphine
- Levonantradol
