= Cycloheptyl CP 55,940 =

Chemical compound

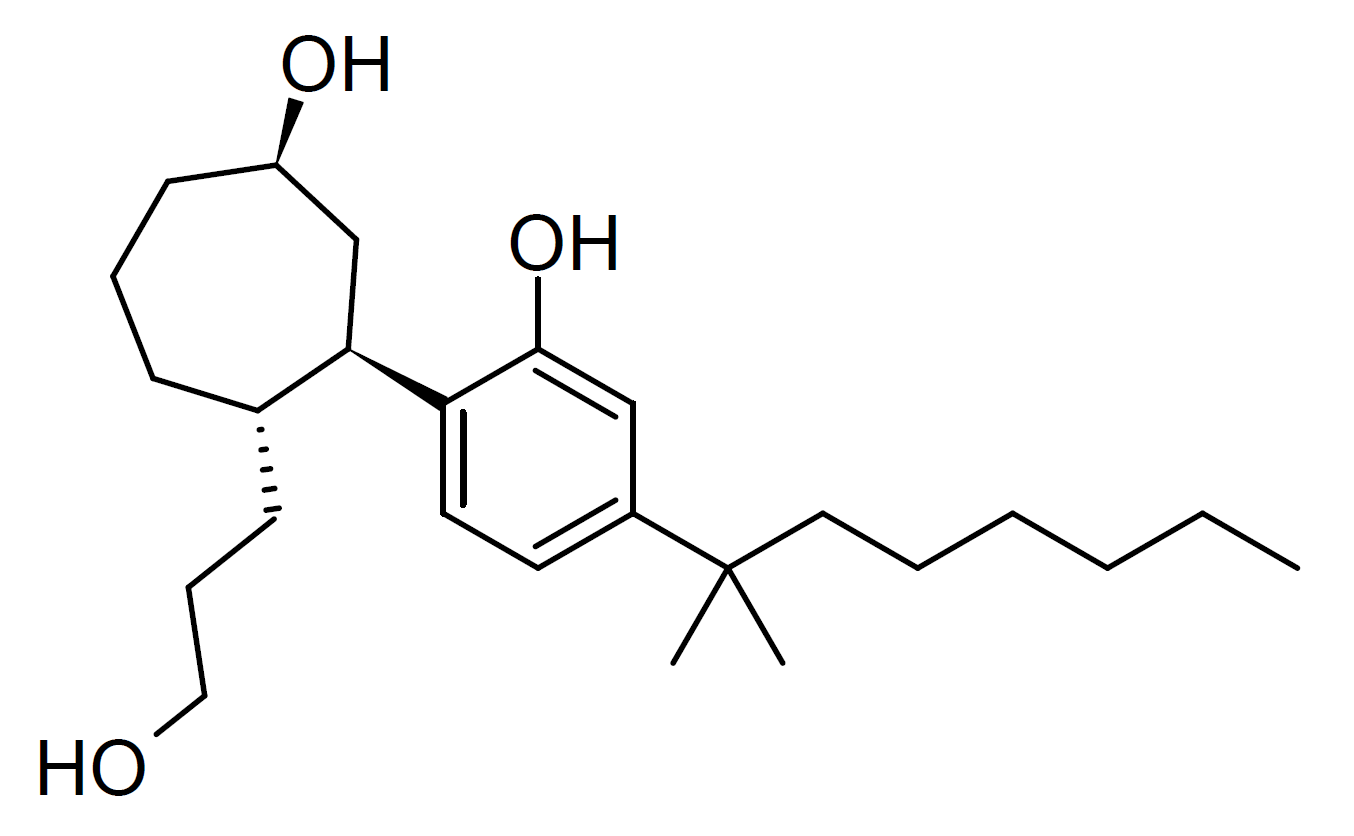

Identifiers
- IUPAC name: (1R,3R,4R)-3-[4-(1,1-dimethylheptyl)-2-hydroxyphenyl]-4-(3-hydroxypropyl)cycloheptan-1-ol
- CAS Number: 83003-25-2

Chemical and physical data
- Formula: C_{25}H_{42}O_{3}
- Molar mass: 390.608 g·mol^{−1}
- 3D model (JSmol): Interactive image
- SMILES: O[C@H]1C[C@H]([C@H](CCCO)CCC1)c1ccc(cc1O)C(C)(C)CCCCCC
- InChI: InChI=InChI=1S/C25H42O3/c1-4-5-6-7-15-25(2,3)20-13-14-22(24(28)17-20)23-18-21(27)12-8-10-19(23)11-9-16-26/h13-14,17,19,21,23,26-28H,4-12,15-16,18H2,1-3H3/t19-,21+,23+/m0/s1; Key:JYVBHJZDNJZVAK-XKCSPQBFSA-N

Cycloheptyl CP 55,940 is a synthetic cannabinoid related to CP 55,940 but is a ring-expanded homologue with a cycloheptyl ring in place of the cyclohexyl ring. It was first synthesized by Pfizer in the 1980s. It falls outside the definition of a "cyclohexylphenol derivative" since it does not have a cyclohexyl ring. Cycloheptyl CP 55,940 has similar potency to CP 55,940 itself, with an ED_{50} of 0.06 mg/kg in animal studies.

== See also ==
- Abeo-HHC acetate
- CP 47,497
- O-1656
