= THC-O =

THC-O may refer to any of three different cannabinoid derivatives which have been sold as legal alternatives to THC:

- THC-O-acetate
- Tetrahydrocannaboxime
- Tetrahydrocannabioctyl
