= O-1656 =

Synthetic cannabinoid

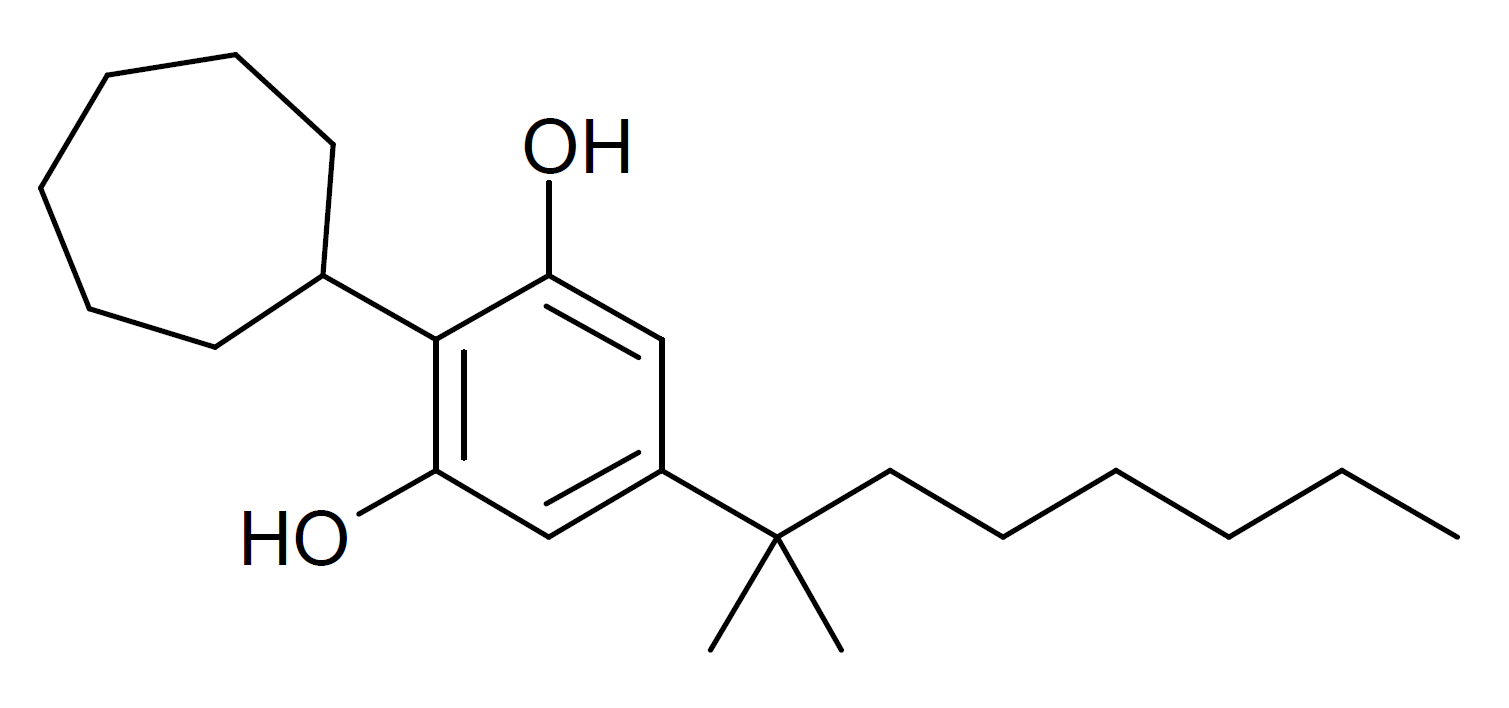

Clinical data
- ATC code: none

Identifiers
- IUPAC name: 2-cycloheptyl-5-(2-methyloctan-2-yl)benzene-1,3-diol
- CAS Number: 468083-75-2
- PubChem CID: 58803980

Chemical and physical data
- Formula: C_{22}H_{36}O_{2}
- Molar mass: 332.528 g·mol^{−1}
- 3D model (JSmol): Interactive image
- SMILES: CCCCCCC(C)(C)C1=CC(=C(C(=C1)O)C2CCCCCC2)O
- InChI: InChI=1S/C22H36O2/c1-4-5-6-11-14-22(2,3)18-15-19(23)21(20(24)16-18)17-12-9-7-8-10-13-17/h15-17,23-24H,4-14H2,1-3H3; Key:AECZEBWFCJESSN-UHFFFAOYSA-N

O-1656 is an alkylresorcinol-type synthetic cannabinoid which was invented by Billy R Martin and Raj K Razdan at Organix Inc in 2002. It is moderately selective for the CB_{2} receptor with a CB_{1} receptor affinity of 18 nM and a CB_{2} receptor affinity of 2 nM. Since it has a cycloheptyl ring attached to a phenolic core, it falls outside the definition of "cyclohexylphenol derivatives", but may still be controlled substance in some jurisdictions.

== See also ==
- Abeo-HHC acetate
- CBD-DMH
- CP 55,940
- Cannabidiol
- Cannabicyclohexanol
- Cycloheptyl CP 55,940
- O-1871
