= Cannabinor =

Chemical compound

Identifiers
- IUPAC name: (E)-4-[2-[(1S,2S,5S)-6,6-dimethyl-4-oxo-2-bicyclo[3.1.1]heptanyl]-3-hydroxy-5-(2-methyloctan-2-yl)phenoxy]-4-oxobut-2-enoic acid
- CAS Number: 573981-31-4
- PubChem CID: 10174045
- DrugBank: DB05048
- ChemSpider: 8349550
- UNII: O8E148Q90M
- ChEMBL: ChEMBL3234035
- CompTox Dashboard (EPA): DTXSID701019168

Chemical and physical data
- Formula: C_{28}H_{36}O_{6}
- Molar mass: 468.590 g·mol^{−1}
- 3D model (JSmol): Interactive image
- SMILES: CCCCCCC(C)(C)C1=CC(=C(C(=C1)OC(=O)/C=C/C(=O)O)[C@H]2CC(=O)[C@H]3C[C@@H]2C3(C)C)O
- InChI: InChI=1S/C28H38O6/c1-6-7-8-9-12-27(2,3)17-13-22(30)26(23(14-17)34-25(33)11-10-24(31)32)18-15-21(29)20-16-19(18)28(20,4)5/h10-11,13-14,18-20,30H,6-9,12,15-16H2,1-5H3,(H,31,32)/b11-10+/t18-,19-,20+/m0/s1; Key:GSTZHANFXAKPSE-MXTREEOPSA-N

Cannabinor (PRS-211,375) is a drug which acts as a potent and selective cannabinoid CB_{2} receptor agonist. It is classed as a "nonclassical" cannabinoid with a chemical structure similar to that of cannabidiol. It has a CB_{2} affinity of 17.4 nM vs 5,585 nM at CB_{1}, giving it over 300× selectivity for CB_{2}. It showed analgesic effects in animal studies especially in models of neuropathic pain, but failed in Phase IIb human clinical trials due to lack of efficacy.

== See also ==
- Cannabicyclohexanol
- O-1871
