= C24H32O3 =

The molecular formula C_{24}H_{32}O_{3} (molar mass: 368.517 g/mol) may refer to:

- Caleicine
- 1,2-Didehydro-3-oxo-THCO
