= O-1871 =

Chemical compound

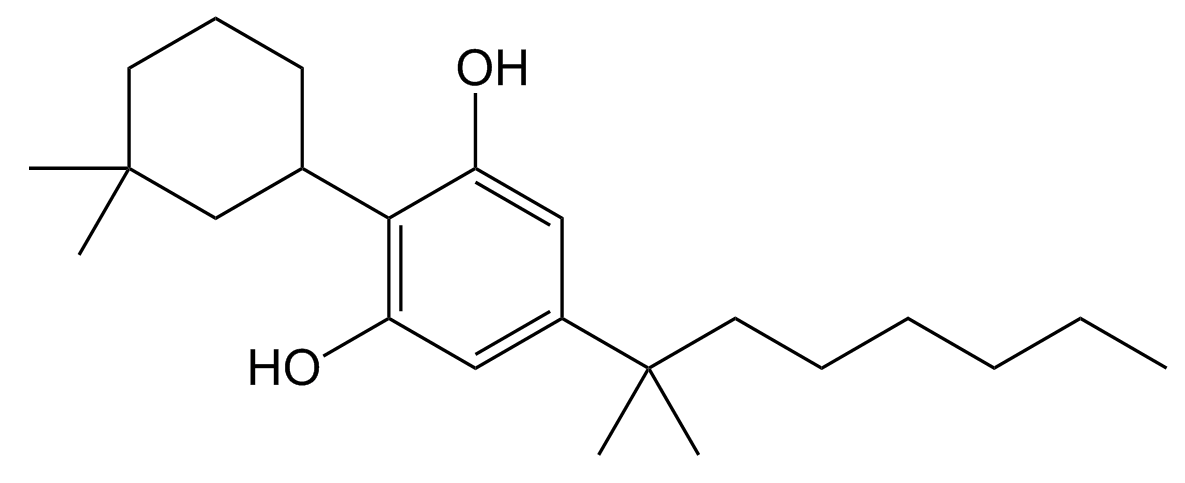

Clinical data
- ATC code: none

Legal status
- Legal status: Banned as cyclohexylphenol derivative (US, UK)

Identifiers
- IUPAC name: 2-(3,3-dimethylcyclohexyl)-5-(2-methyloctan-2-yl)benzene-1,3-diol
- CAS Number: 620964-96-7
- PubChem CID: 10405368
- ChemSpider: 8580806
- UNII: SGY2L36FDU
- CompTox Dashboard (EPA): DTXSID301045400

Chemical and physical data
- Formula: C_{23}H_{38}O_{2}
- Molar mass: 346.555 g·mol^{−1}
- 3D model (JSmol): Interactive image
- SMILES: CC(C1)(C)CCCC1C2=C(O)C=C(C(C)(C)CCCCCC)C=C2O
- InChI: InChI=1S/C23H38O2/c1-6-7-8-9-13-23(4,5)18-14-19(24)21(20(25)15-18)17-11-10-12-22(2,3)16-17/h14-15,17,24-25H,6-13,16H2,1-5H3; Key:WBSPBIRKSHKQQD-UHFFFAOYSA-N

O-1871 is an alkylresorcinol-type synthetic cannabinoid which was invented by Billy R Martin and Raj K Razdan at Organix Inc in 2002. It has a CB_{1} receptor affinity of 2.0 nM and a CB_{2} receptor affinity of 0.3 nM. Structurally, O-1871 is a cyclohexylphenol derivative related to CP 47,497, and so is illegal in some jurisdictions where CP 47,497 and its derivatives are banned. However the 3,3-dimethylcyclohexyl substituent of O-1871 can be replaced by various other groups, producing other potent compounds such as the cycloheptyl derivative O-1656 and the 2-adamantyl derivative O-1660, as well as the corresponding 3,5-dichlorophenyl derivative, which are not cyclohexylphenol derivatives.

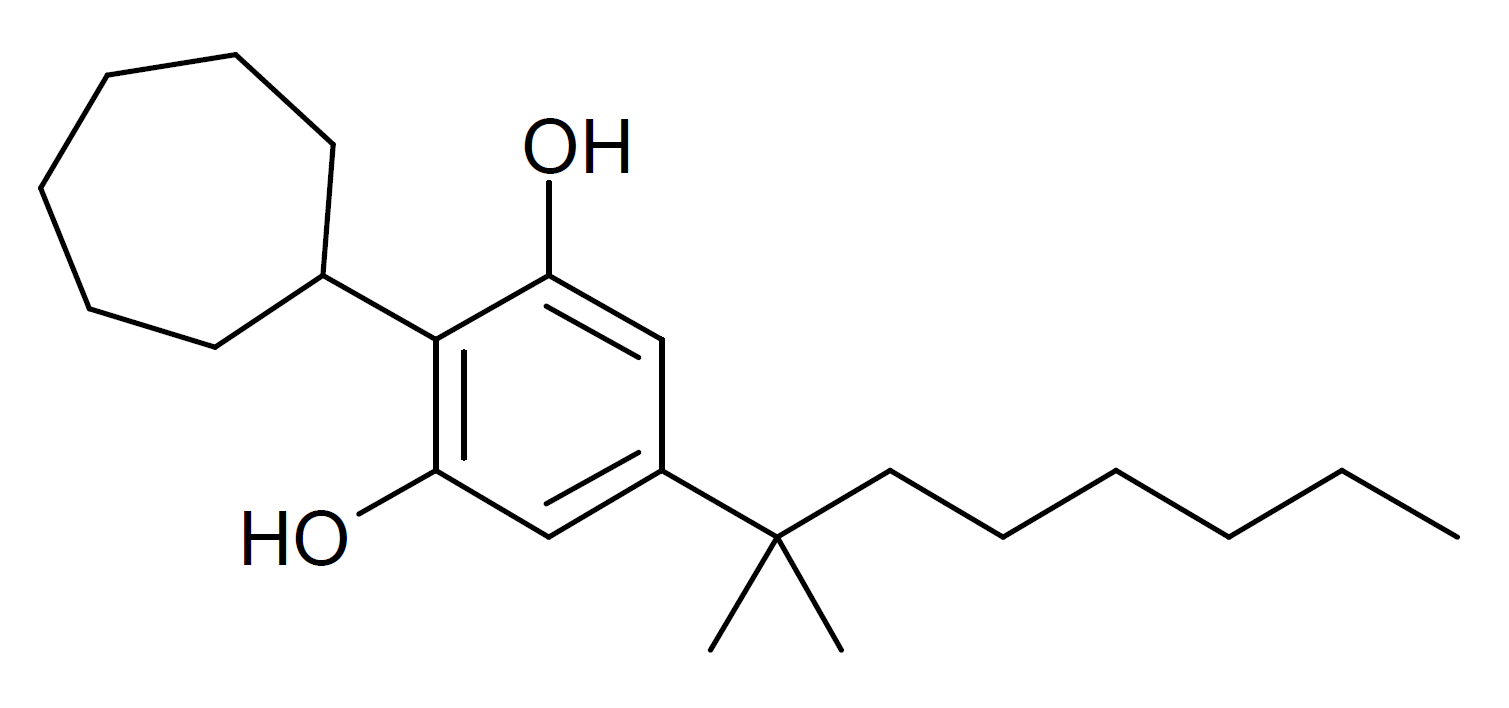
O-1656, CAS# 468083-75-2

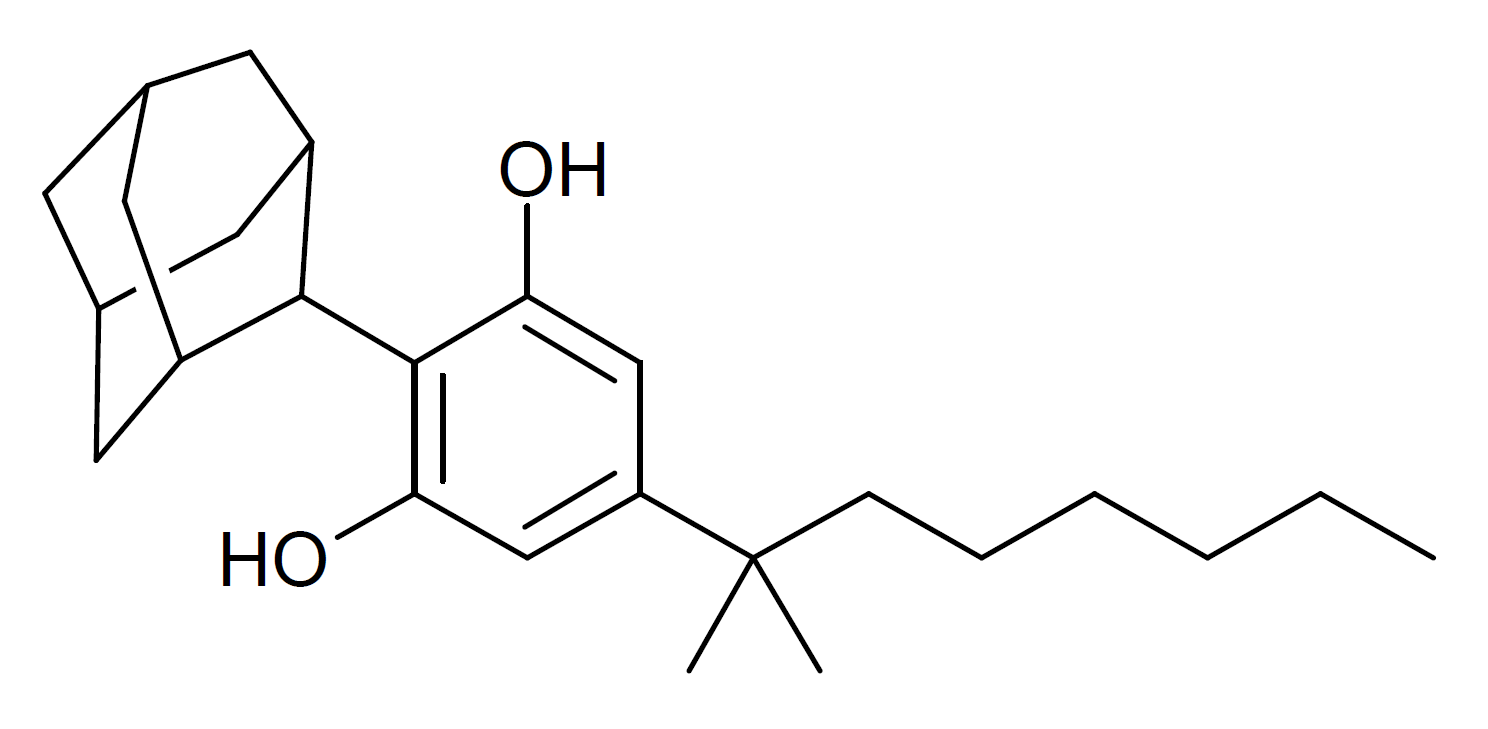
O-1660,

== See also ==
- CP 55,940
- Cannabidiol
- Cannabicyclohexanol
- Cannabinor
