= (C6)-CP 47,497 =

Chemical compound

Legal status
- Legal status: DE: Anlage II (Authorized trade only, not prescriptible); UK: Class B; Illegal in France

Identifiers
- IUPAC name: 2-[(1S,3R)-3-hydroxycyclohexyl]- 5-(2-methylheptan-2-yl)phenol
- CAS Number: 132296-20-9
- PubChem CID: 12788252
- ChemSpider: 29342068
- UNII: DU5BQ63J05
- CompTox Dashboard (EPA): DTXSID40509880

Chemical and physical data
- Formula: C_{20}H_{32}O_{2}
- Molar mass: 304.474 g·mol^{−1}
- 3D model (JSmol): Interactive image
- SMILES: OC1=CC(C(C)(C)CCCCC)=CC=C1[C@@H]2C[C@H](O)CCC2
- InChI: InChI=1S/C20H32O2/c1-4-5-6-12-20(2,3)16-10-11-18(19(22)14-16)15-8-7-9-17(21)13-15/h10-11,14-15,17,21-22H,4-9,12-13H2,1-3H3/t15-,17+/m0/s1; Key:KQUGQXNYBWYGAI-DOTOQJQBSA-N

(C6)-CP 47,497 (CP 47,497 dimethylhexyl homologue) is a synthetic cannabinoid, a CP 47,497 homologue.

Its systematic name is 2-[(1S,3R)-3-hydroxycyclohexyl]-5-(1,1-dimethylhexyl)phenol.

== See also ==
- Synthetic cannabis
- 1'-Dimethyl-Δ9-THCH
- (C7)-CP 47,497 also known as CP 47,497
- (C8)-CP 47,497 also known as Cannabicyclohexanol
- (C9)-CP 47,497
