= CP 55,244 =

Chemical compound

Identifiers
- IUPAC name: (2S,4S,4aS,6R,8aR)-6-(Hydroxymethyl)-4-[2-hydroxy-4-(2-methyloctan-2-yl)phenyl]-1,2,3,4,4a,5,6,7,8,8a-decahydronaphthalen-2-ol
- CAS Number: 79678-32-3
- PubChem CID: 133254
- ChemSpider: 117567
- UNII: 3HMR7H9HX8
- CompTox Dashboard (EPA): DTXSID701000660

Chemical and physical data
- Formula: C_{26}H_{42}O_{3}
- Molar mass: 402.619 g·mol^{−1}
- 3D model (JSmol): Interactive image
- SMILES: CCCCCCC(C)(C)c1ccc(c(c1)O)[C@H]2C[C@H](C[C@@H]3[C@@H]2C[C@@H](CC3)CO)O
- InChI: InChI=1S/C26H42O3/c1-4-5-6-7-12-26(2,3)20-10-11-22(25(29)15-20)24-16-21(28)14-19-9-8-18(17-27)13-23(19)24/h10-11,15,18-19,21,23-24,27-29H,4-9,12-14,16-17H2,1-3H3/t18-,19-,21+,23+,24-/m1/s1; Key:ZAELPWSCABXXAB-QXASVXAKSA-N

CP 55,244 is a chemical compound which is a cannabinoid receptor agonist. It has analgesic effects and is used in scientific research. It is an extremely potent CB_{1} full agonist with a K_{i} of 0.21 nM, making it more potent than the commonly used full agonist HU-210.

== See also ==
- CP 42,096
- CP 47,497
- CP 55,940
