= Nonabine =

Chemical compound

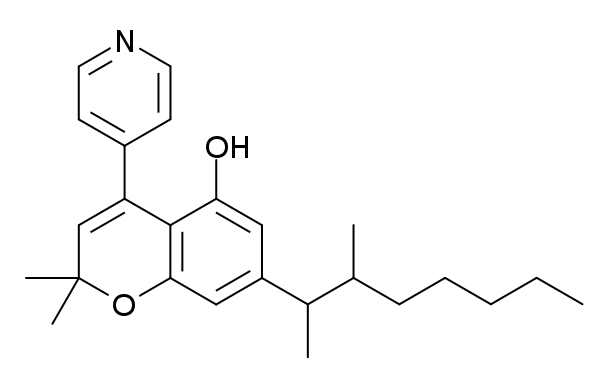

Clinical data
- ATC code: none

Legal status
- Legal status: Not approved for any medical use

Identifiers
- IUPAC name: 7-(1,2-Dimethylheptyl)-2,2-dimethyl-4-(4-pyridinyl)-2H-1-benzopyran-5-ol
- CAS Number: 16985-03-8
- PubChem CID: 71885
- ChemSpider: 64899
- UNII: 77DUK856J7
- CompTox Dashboard (EPA): DTXSID20864727

Chemical and physical data
- Formula: C_{25}H_{33}NO_{2}
- Molar mass: 379.544 g·mol^{−1}
- 3D model (JSmol): Interactive image
- SMILES: CCCCCC(C)C(C)c1cc(c2c(c1)OC(C=C2c3ccncc3)(C)C)O
- InChI: InChI=1S/C25H33NO2/c1-6-7-8-9-17(2)18(3)20-14-22(27)24-21(19-10-12-26-13-11-19)16-25(4,5)28-23(24)15-20/h10-18,27H,6-9H2,1-5H3; Key:YHUDSHIRWOVVCV-UHFFFAOYSA-N

Nonabine (BRL-4664) is an experimental drug which is a synthetic THC analog. It was studied in the 1980s for the prevention of nausea and vomiting associated with cancer chemotherapy but was never marketed. It has strong antiemetic effects equivalent to those of chlorpromazine, and also produces some mild sedative effects, along with dry mouth and EEG changes typical of cannabinoid agonists, but with minimal changes in mood or perception, suggesting the abuse potential is likely to be low.
