= 1,2-Didehydro-3-oxo-THCO =

Synthetic cannabinoid

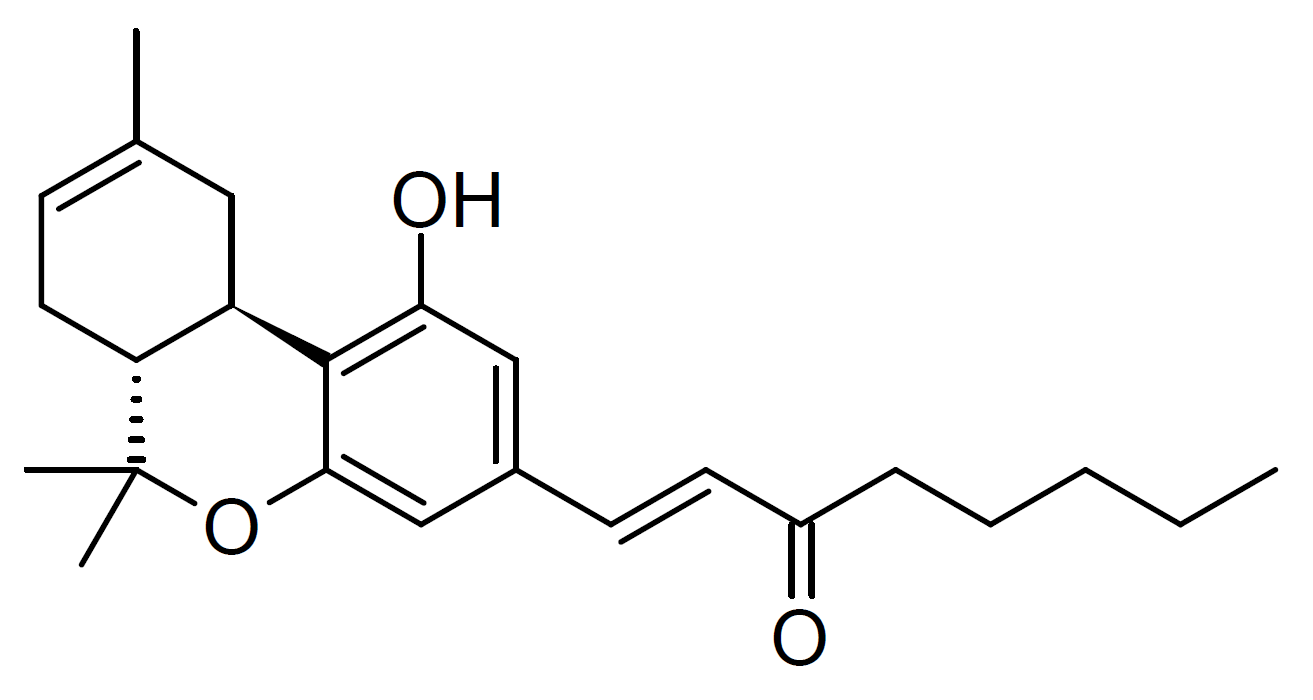

Identifiers
- IUPAC name: (1E)-1-[(6aR,10aR)-1-Hydroxy-6,6,9-trimethyl-6a,7,10,10a-tetrahydro-6H-dibenzo[b,d]pyran-3-yl]oct-1-en-3-one
- CAS Number: 60081-22-3
- PubChem CID: 68117058

Chemical and physical data
- Formula: C_{24}H_{32}O_{3}
- Molar mass: 368.517 g·mol^{−1}
- 3D model (JSmol): Interactive image
- SMILES: CCCCCC(=O)/C=C/c1cc2OC(C)(C)[C@@H]3CC=C(C)C[C@H]3c2c(O)c1
- InChI: InChI=1S/C24H32O3/c1-5-6-7-8-18(25)11-10-17-14-21(26)23-19-13-16(2)9-12-20(19)24(3,4)27-22(23)15-17/h9-11,14-15,19-20,26H,5-8,12-13H2,1-4H3; Key:GXEAAYCVYYJDGY-UHFFFAOYSA-N

1,2-Didehydro-3-oxo-THCO (1,2-Didehydro-3-oxo-Δ^{8}-tetrahydrocannabioctyl) is a semi-synthetic cannabinoid first synthesised by Raj K Razdan et al. in the 1970s, with potent cannabinoid effects.

== See also ==
- 3'-Hydroxy-THC
- AM-905
- Cannabicyclohexanol
- JWH-138
- Parahexyl
- Tetrahydrocannabihexol
- THCP
