= (C9)-CP 47,497 =

Chemical compound

Legal status
- Legal status: DE: Anlage II (Authorized trade only, not prescriptible); UK: Class B; Illegal in France

Identifiers
- IUPAC name: 2-[(1S,3R)-3-hydroxycyclohexyl]-5-(2-methyldecan-2-yl)phenol
- CAS Number: 132296-12-9
- PubChem CID: 12788255
- ChemSpider: 29342069
- UNII: 7W96Y4OF1O
- CompTox Dashboard (EPA): DTXSID90875481

Chemical and physical data
- Formula: C_{23}H_{38}O_{2}
- Molar mass: 346.555 g·mol^{−1}
- 3D model (JSmol): Interactive image
- SMILES: OC1=CC(C(C)(C)CCCCCCCC)=CC=C1[C@@H]2C[C@H](O)CCC2
- InChI: InChI=1S/C23H38O2/c1-4-5-6-7-8-9-15-23(2,3)19-13-14-21(22(25)17-19)18-11-10-12-20(24)16-18/h13-14,17-18,20,24-25H,4-12,15-16H2,1-3H3/t18-,20+/m0/s1; Key:BIGNODGYJZJTBM-AZUAARDMSA-N

(C9)-CP 47,497 (CP 47,497 dimethylnonyl homologue) is a synthetic cannabinoid, a CP 47,497 homologue.

Its systematic name is 2-[(1S,3R)-3-hydroxycyclohexyl]-5-(1,1-dimethylnonyl)phenol.

== See also ==
- Synthetic cannabis
- (C6)-CP 47,497
- (C7)-CP 47,497 (CP 47,497 itself)
- (C8)-CP 47,497
