= AM-905 =

Chemical compound

Identifiers
- IUPAC name: (6aR,9R,10aR)-3-[(E)-hept-1-enyl]-9-(hydroxymethyl)-6,6-dimethyl-6a,7,8,9,10,10a-hexahydrobenzo[c]chromen-1-ol
- CAS Number: 181139-62-8
- PubChem CID: 9998522
- ChemSpider: 8174103
- UNII: TJ6JD73J07
- ChEMBL: ChEMBL127848
- CompTox Dashboard (EPA): DTXSID401027471

Chemical and physical data
- Formula: C_{23}H_{34}O_{3}
- Molar mass: 358.522 g·mol^{−1}
- 3D model (JSmol): Interactive image
- SMILES: CCCCC/C=C/c(cc1O)cc(OC(C)(C)C2CC3)c1C2CC3CO
- InChI: InChI=1S/C23H34O3/c1-4-5-6-7-8-9-16-13-20(25)22-18-12-17(15-24)10-11-19(18)23(2,3)26-21(22)14-16/h8-9,13-14,17-19,24-25H,4-7,10-12,15H2,1-3H3/b9-8+/t17-,18-,19-/m1/s1; Key:NJIKRWBGUIYKJM-OKMMTOMJSA-N

AM-905 (part of the AM cannabinoid series) is an analgesic drug which is a cannabinoid agonist. It is conformationally restricted by virtue of the double bond on its side chain, leading an increased affinity for and selectivity between CB_{1} and CB_{2} receptors. It is a potent and reasonably selective agonist for the CB_{1} cannabinoid receptor, with a K_{i} of 1.2 nM at CB_{1} and 5.3 nM at CB_{2}.

== See also ==
- 1,2-Didehydro-3-oxo-THCO
- AM-906 - The corresponding Z or cis isomer
- HU-243 - Double bond replaced by geminal methyls for Thorpe–Ingold effect
