= Abeo-HHC acetate =

Semi-synthetic derivative of THC

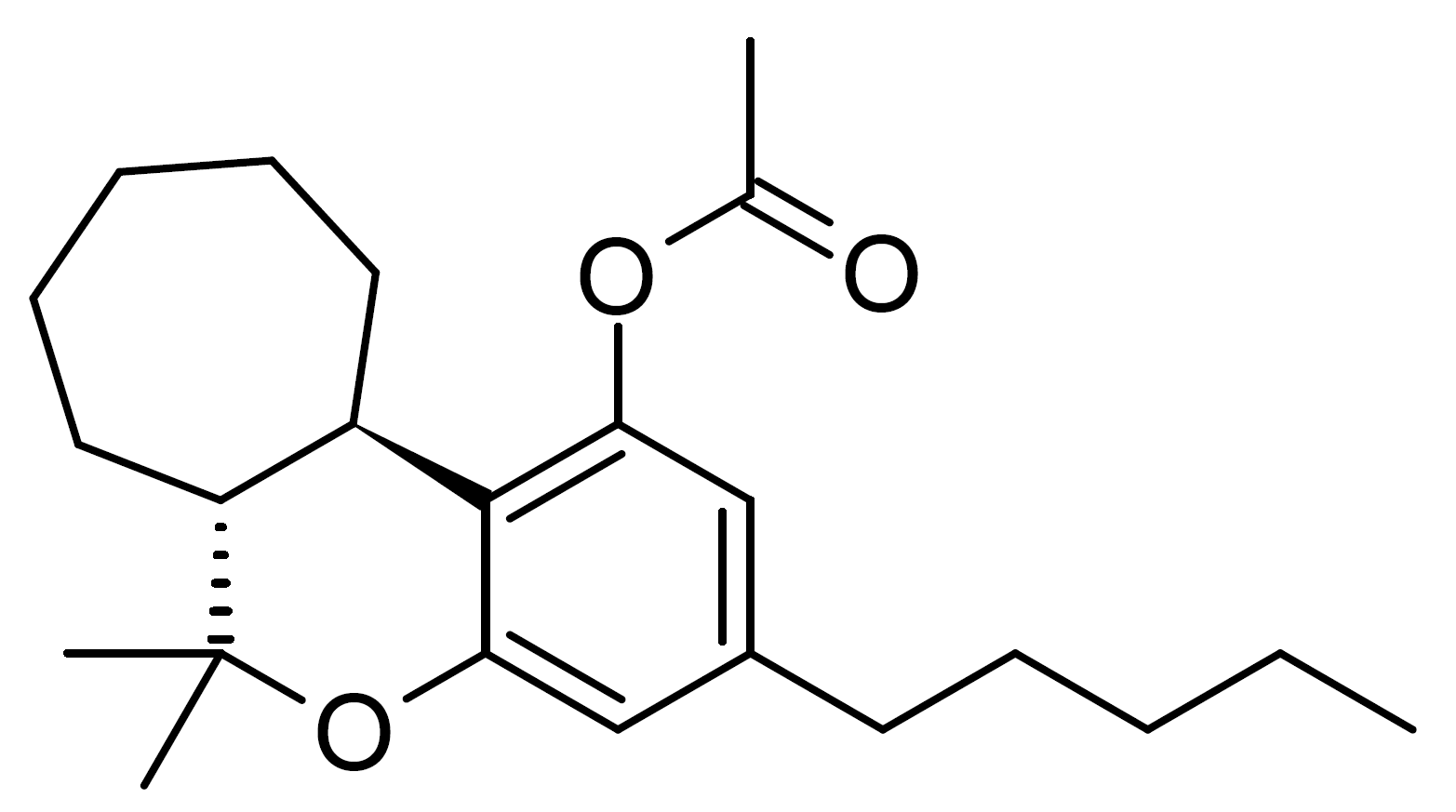

Identifiers
- IUPAC name: [(6aR,11aR)-6,6-dimethyl-3-pentyl-6a,7,8,10,11,11a-hexahydrocyclohepta[c]chromen-1-yl] acetate
- CAS Number: 96290-83-4

Chemical and physical data
- Formula: C_{23}H_{34}O_{3}
- Molar mass: 358.522 g·mol^{−1}
- 3D model (JSmol): Interactive image
- SMILES: CC(=O)Oc1cc(CCCCC)cc2OC(C)(C)[C@@H]3CCCCC[C@H]3c12
- InChI: InChI=1S/C23H34O3/c1-5-6-8-11-17-14-20(25-16(2)24)22-18-12-9-7-10-13-19(18)23(3,4)26-21(22)15-17/h14-15,18-19H,5-13H2,1-4H3/t18-,19-/m1/s1; Key:NTJCIGWEPIAFSM-RTBURBONSA-N

Abeo-HHC acetate is a semi-synthetic derivative of tetrahydrocannabinol, first described in the 1980s. It is synthesised from delta-11-tetrahydrocannabinol, which can be made to undergo a ring expansion reaction via a hydrazone intermediate. It is structurally similar to HHC-acetate except that the methylated cyclohexyl ring has been replaced by a cycloheptane.

== See also ==
- Cis-THC
- Cycloheptyl CP 55,940
- Hexahydrocannabinol
- Iso-THC
- O-1656
- THC-O-acetate
