= JWH-138 =

Chemical compound

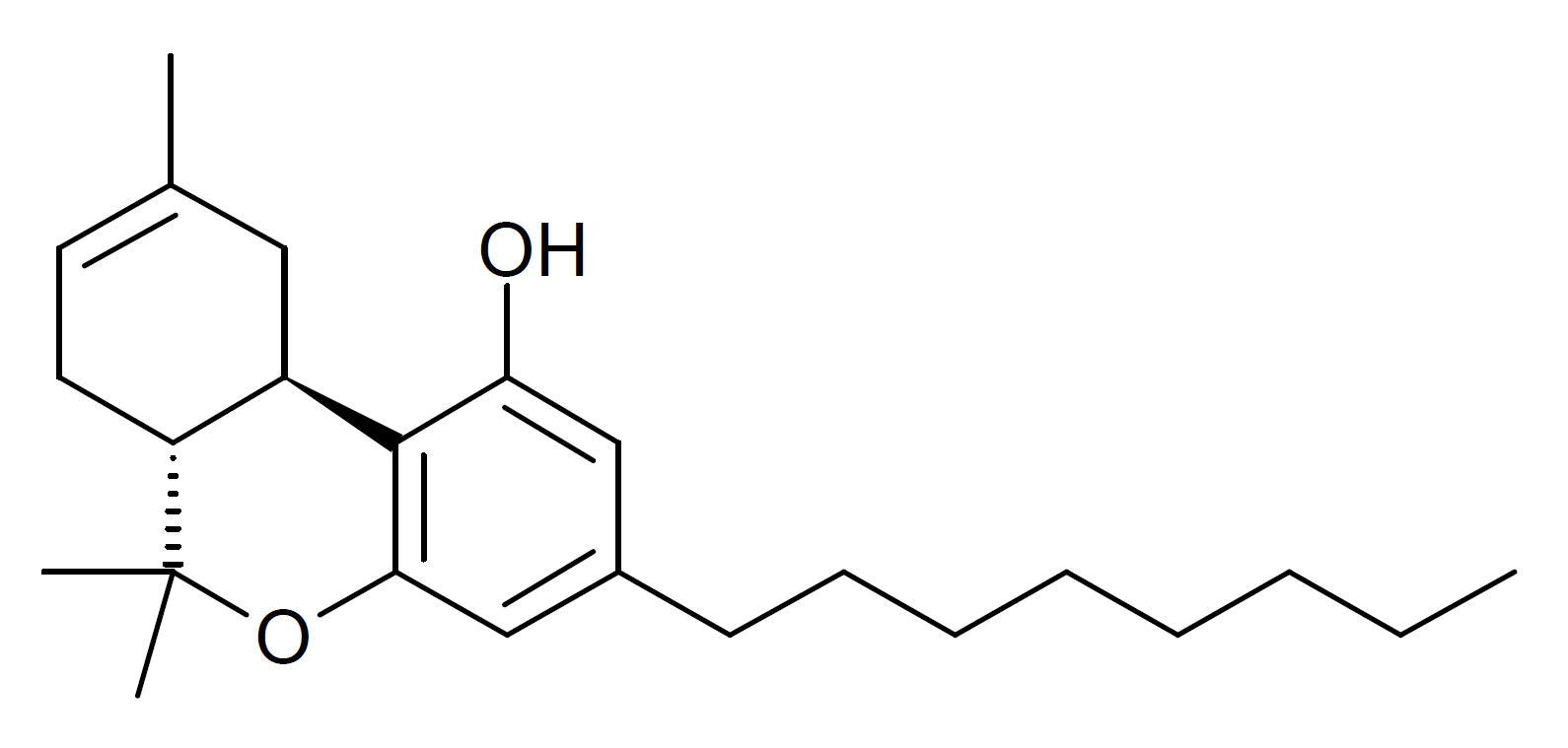

Identifiers
- IUPAC name: (6aR,10aR)-6a,7,8,10a-tetrahydro-6,6,9-trimethyl-3-octyl-6H-Dibenzo[b,d]pyran-1-ol
- CAS Number: 431041-39-3
- PubChem CID: 102024084
- ChemSpider: 115285238

Chemical and physical data
- Formula: C_{24}H_{36}O_{2}
- Molar mass: 356.550 g·mol^{−1}
- 3D model (JSmol): Interactive image
- SMILES: OC1=C2[C@]3([C@](C(C)(C)OC2=CC(CCCCCCCC)=C1)(CCC(C)=C3)[H])[H]
- InChI: InChI=InChI=1S/C24H36O2/c1-5-6-7-8-9-10-11-18-15-21(25)23-19-14-17(2)12-13-20(19)24(3,4)26-22(23)16-18/h14-16,19-20,25H,5-13H2,1-4H3/t19-,20-/m1/s1; Key:SFWRRSGOJSILSQ-WOJBJXKFSA-N

JWH-138 (Δ^{8}-THC-Octyl, Δ^{8}-THC-C8) is a synthetic cannabinoid first synthesized by Roger Adams and later studied by John W. Huffman, with a K_{i} of 8.5nM at the CB_{1} cannabinoid receptor.

== Isomers ==
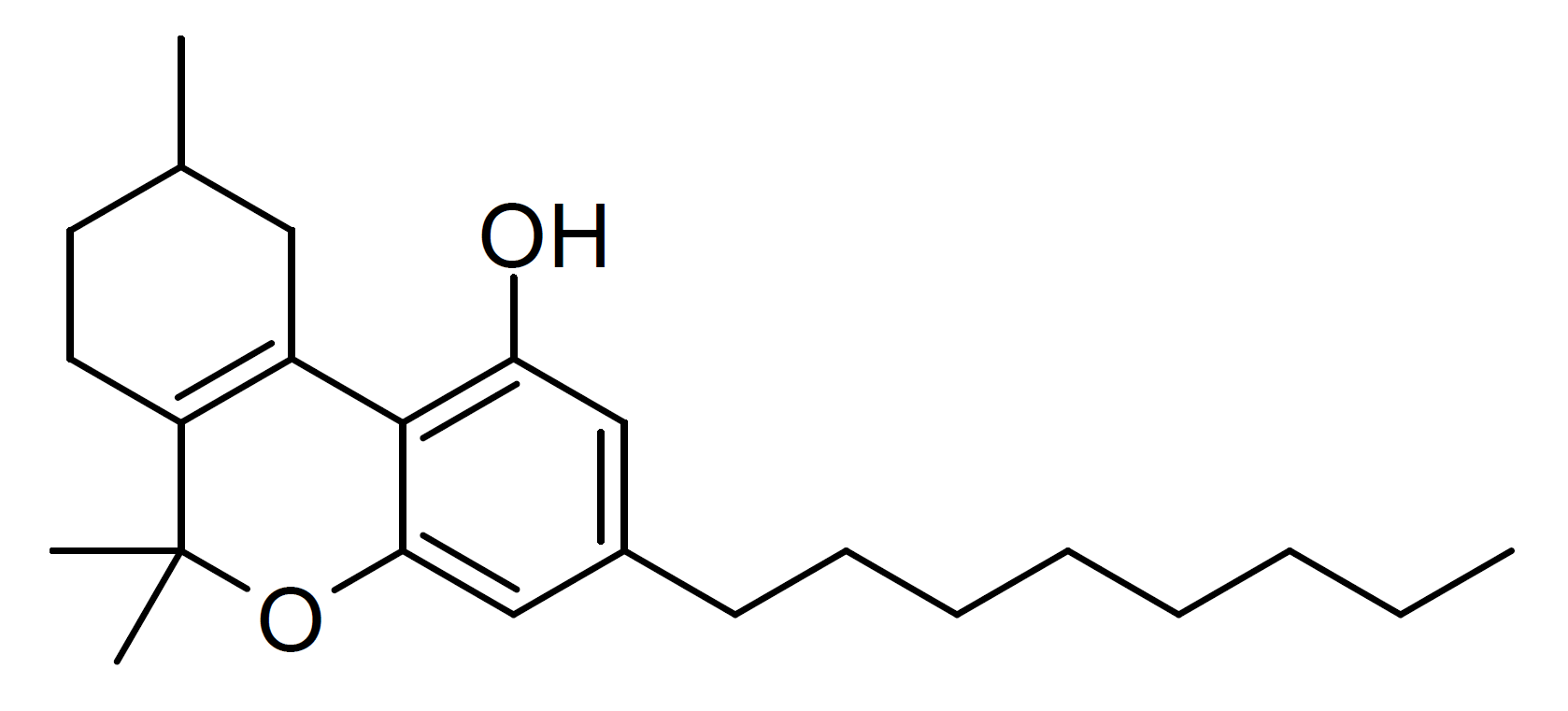
Δ^{3}-THC-C8

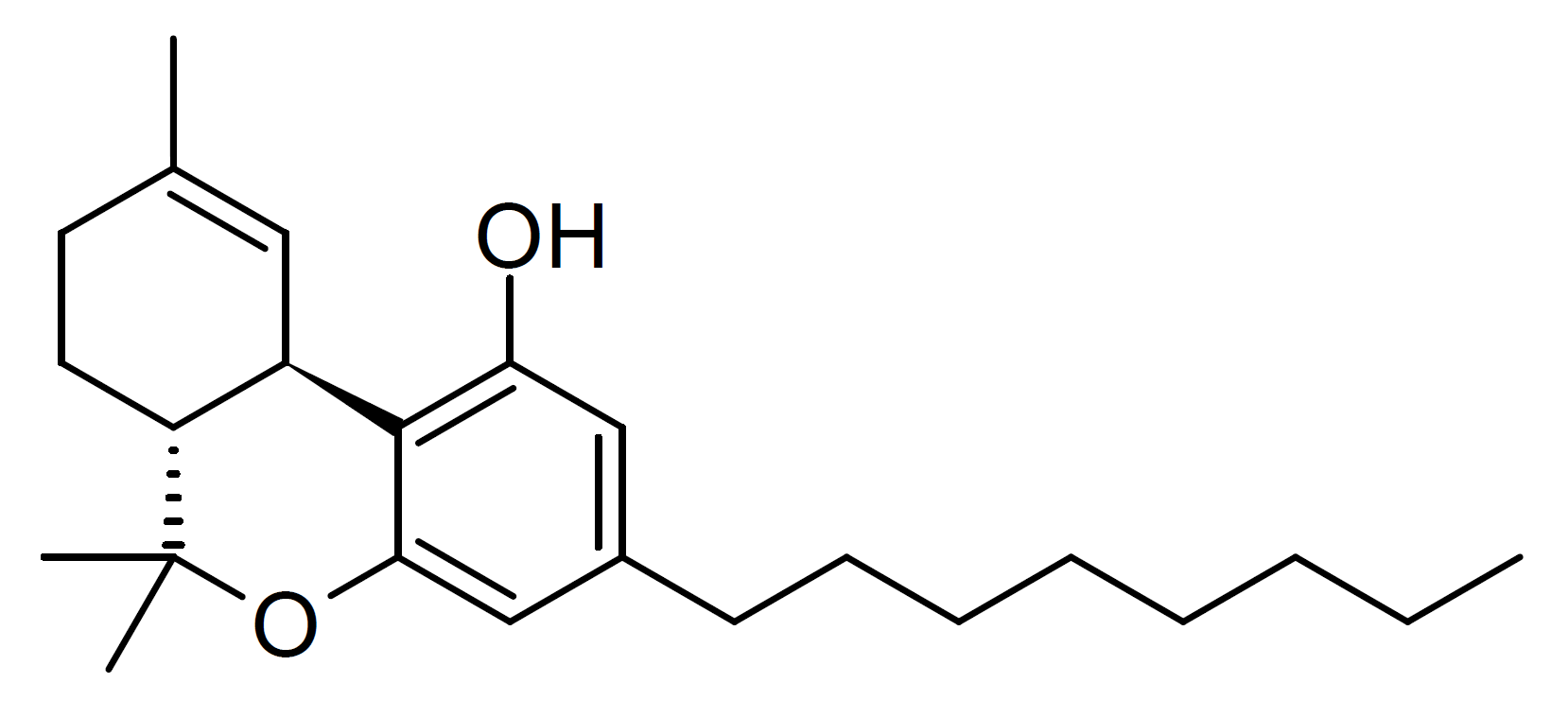
Δ^{9}-THC-C8 (tetrahydrocannabioctyl), CAS# 2552798-63-5

The Δ^{3}/Δ^{6a(10a)} isomer was synthesised in 1941, but was found to be slightly less active than Δ^{3}-THC itself. The alternate isomer Δ^{9}-THC-C8 has also been studied..

Tetrahydrocannabioctyl is sometimes referred to as THC-Octyl or THC-O, which may cause confusion with THC-O-acetate which is commonly known as THC-O on packaging intended for illicit and/or counterfeit cannabis vaporizer products. Various alkyl chain extended analogs of Δ^{9}-THC have been sold as designer drugs or as counterfeit cannabis vaporizer products.

== Legality ==
Both the Δ^{8} and Δ^{9} isomers are included within the definition of an "intoxicating cannabinoid" in Colorado under the name tetrahydrocannabioctyl, but it is unclear if it has ever been identified as a natural product.

== See also ==
- 1,2-Didehydro-3-oxo-THCO
- Cannabicyclohexanol
- Parahexyl
- Tetrahydrocannabihexol
- THCP
