= CP 55,940 =

Chemical compound

Legal status
- Legal status: CA: Schedule II

Identifiers
- IUPAC name: 2-[(1R,2R,5R)-5-Hydroxy-2-(3-hydroxypropyl)cyclohexyl]-5-(2-methyloctan-2-yl)phenol
- CAS Number: 83002-04-4
- PubChem CID: 3086156
- ChemSpider: 94668
- UNII: KFY70972J5
- ChEMBL: ChEMBL559612
- CompTox Dashboard (EPA): DTXSID80875516

Chemical and physical data
- Formula: C_{24}H_{40}O_{3}
- Molar mass: 376.581 g·mol^{−1}
- 3D model (JSmol): Interactive image
- SMILES: O[C@H]1C[C@@H](C2=CC=C(C(C)(C)CCCCCC)C=C2O)[C@H](CCCO)CC1
- InChI: InChI=1S/C24H40O3/c1-4-5-6-7-14-24(2,3)19-11-13-21(23(27)16-19)22-17-20(26)12-10-18(22)9-8-15-25/h11,13,16,18,20,22,25-27H,4-10,12,14-15,17H2,1-3H3/t18-,20-,22-/m1/s1; Key:YNZFFALZMRAPHQ-SYYKKAFVSA-N

CP 55,940 is a synthetic cannabinoid which mimics the effects of naturally occurring THC (one of the psychoactive compounds found in cannabis). CP 55,940 was created by Pfizer in 1974 but was never marketed. It is currently used as a research tool to study the endocannabinoid system.

== Pharmacology ==
CP 55,940 is 45 times more potent than Δ^{9}-THC, and fully antagonized by rimonabant (SR141716A). It is considered a full agonist at both CB_{1} and CB_{2} receptors and has K_{i} values of 0.58 nM and 0.68 nM respectively, but is an antagonist at GPR55, the putative "CB_{3}" receptor. CP 55,940 binding has been detected in the cytosol of rat brain cerebral cortex. It can upregulate 5-HT_{2A} receptors in mice.

== In vitro studies ==
CP 55,940 induced cell death in NG 108-15 Mouse neuroblastoma x Rat glioma hybrid brain cancer (genetically engineered mouse x rat brain cancer) cells.

== In vivo studies ==
CP 55,940 showed protective effects on rat brain mitochondria upon paraquat exposure.

It also showed neuroprotective effects by reducing intracellular calcium release and reducing hippocampal cell death in cultured neurons subjected to high levels of NMDA.

== See also ==
- CP 42,096
- CP 47,497
- CP 55,244
- Cycloheptyl CP 55,940
