= Cannabicyclohexanol =

Chemical compound

Legal status
- Legal status: DE: Anlage II (Authorized trade only, not prescriptible); UK: Class B; US: Schedule I; Illegal in France

Identifiers
- IUPAC name: 2-[(1R,3S)-3-hydroxycyclohexyl]-5-(2-methylnonan-2-yl)phenol
- CAS Number: 70434-92-3
- PubChem CID: 12788231
- ChemSpider: 26668381
- UNII: ESJ086H0VF
- KEGG: C22751
- CompTox Dashboard (EPA): DTXSID001345227 DTXSID30875420, DTXSID001345227
- ECHA InfoCard: 100.230.839

Chemical and physical data
- Formula: C_{22}H_{36}O_{2}
- Molar mass: 332.528 g·mol^{−1}
- 3D model (JSmol): Interactive image
- SMILES: CCCCCCCC(C)(C)C1=CC(=C(C=C1)[C@@H]2CCC[C@@H](C2)O)O
- InChI: InChI=1S/C22H36O2/c1-4-5-6-7-8-14-22(2,3)18-12-13-20(21(24)16-18)17-10-9-11-19(23)15-17/h12-13,16-17,19,23-24H,4-11,14-15H2,1-3H3/t17-,19+/m1/s1; Key:HNMJDLVMIUDJNH-MJGOQNOKSA-N

Cannabicyclohexanol (CCH, CP 47,497 dimethyloctyl homologue, (C8)-CP 47,497) is a cannabinoid receptor agonist drug, developed by Pfizer in 1979. On 19 January 2009, the University of Freiburg in Germany announced that an analog of CP 47,497 was the main active ingredient in the herbal incense product Spice, specifically the 1,1-dimethyloctyl homologue of CP 47,497, which is now known as cannabicyclohexanol. The 1,1-dimethyloctyl homologue of CP 47,497 is in fact several times more potent than the parent compound, which is somewhat unexpected as the 1,1-dimethylheptyl is the most potent substituent in classical cannabinoid compounds such as HU-210.

== Enantiomers ==
Cannabicyclohexanol has four enantiomers, which by analogy with other related cannabinoid compounds can be expected to have widely varying affinity for cannabinoid receptors, and consequently will show considerable variation in potency. While the (-)-cis enantiomer (-)-cannabicyclohexanol discovered in the original Pfizer research is expected to be the most potent, all four enantiomers have been isolated from illicit samples of this compound, and the properties of the other three enantiomers have not been studied in detail. Most commonly cannabicyclohexanol is encountered as a diastereomeric mix of the two cis or two trans isomers in varying ratios, though more rarely a mixture of all four enantiomers has been seen, as well as reasonably enantiopure samples of the most active isomer. Confusion can arise around the naming of these compounds as they can be viewed either as substituted phenols or substituted cyclohexanols, but this results in different numbering of the rings. Consequently, the active isomer can be named either 2-[(1S,3R)-3-hydroxycyclohexyl]-5-(2-methylnonan-2-yl)phenol or (1R,3S)-3-[2-hydroxy-4-(2-methylnonan-2-yl)phenyl]cyclohexan-1-ol.

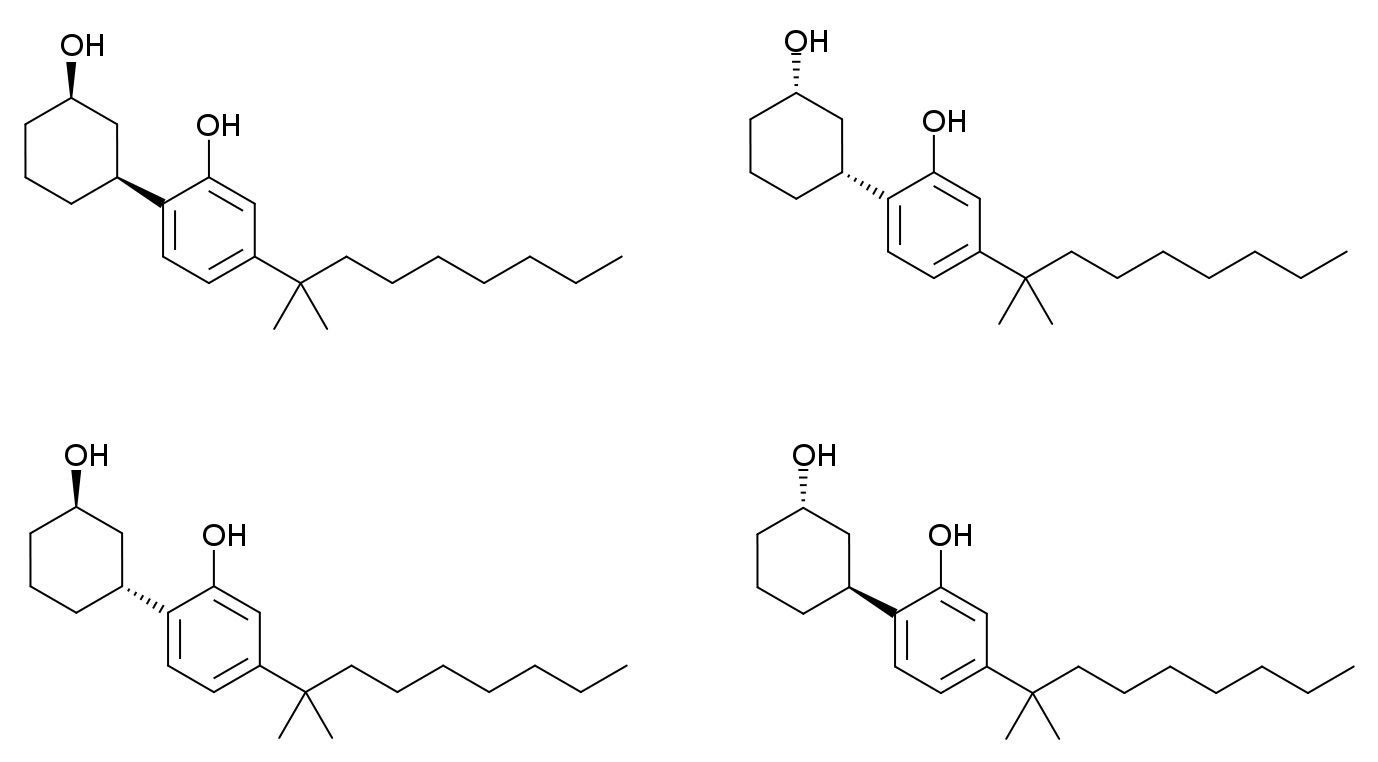
The four enantiomers of cannabicyclohexanol

== Toxicity ==
(C8)-CP 47,497 has been shown to cause DNA damage and inflammation in directly exposed human cells in vitro, though it is unclear if this has any relevance in vivo.

== Legal status ==
Cannabicyclohexanol is not listed in the schedules set out by the United Nations' Single Convention on Narcotic Drugs from 1961 nor their Convention on Psychotropic Substances from 1971, so the signatory countries to these international drug control treaties are not required by said treaties to control Cannabicyclohexanol.

=== United States ===
Cannabicyclohexanol is a Schedule I controlled substance in the USA.

(g) Cannabimimetic agents. Unless specifically exempted or unless listed in another schedule, any material, compound, mixture, or preparation which contains any quantity of the following substances, or which contains their salts, isomers, and salts of isomers whenever the existence of such salts, isomers, and salts of isomers is possible within the specific chemical designation:

...

(2) 5-(1,1-dimethyloctyl)-2-[(1R,3S)-3-hydroxycyclohexyl]-phenol (cannabicyclohexanol or CP-47,497 C8-homolog) [Drug Code: 7298]

==== Vermont ====
Effective January 1, 2016, cannabicyclohexanol is a regulated drug in Vermont designated as a "Hallucinogenic Drug."

“Hallucinogenic Drug” means those specified in Section 7 of this rule including stramonium, mescaline or peyote, lysergic acid diethylamide, and psilocybin, and all synthetic equivalents of chemicals contained in resinous extractives of Cannabis sativa, or any salts or derivatives or compounds of any preparations or mixtures thereof, and any other substance having a hallucinogenic effect in the regulations adopted by the Board of Health under 18 V.S.A.§ 4202.

...

• Cannabimimetic Agents means, collectively, any chemical that is a cannabinoid receptor type 1 (CB1) or cannabinoid receptor type 2 (CB2) agonist, or any salts, isomers, derivatives, or analogs of these chemicals. Structural classes include but are not limited to:

(a) 2-(3-hydroxycyclohexyl)phenol with substitution at the 5-position of the phenolic ring by alkyl or alkenyl, whether or not substituted on the cyclohexyl ring to any extent.

(b) 3-(1-naphthoyl)indole or 3-(1-naphthyl)indole with substitution at the nitrogen atom of the indole ring, whether or not further substituted on the indole ring to any extent, whether or not substituted on the naphthoyl or naphthyl ring to any extent.

(c) 3-(1-naphthoyl)pyrrole with substitution at the nitrogen atom of the pyrrole ring, whether or not further substituted in the pyrrole ring to any extent, whether or not substituted on the naphthoyl ring to any extent.

(d) 1-(1-naphthylmethyl)indene with substitution of the 3-position of the indene ring, whether or not further substituted in the indene ring to any extent, whether or not substituted on the naphthyl ring to any extent.

(e) 3-phenylacetylindole or 3-benzoylindole with substitution at the nitrogen atom of the indole ring, whether or not further substituted in the indole ring to any extent, whether or not substituted on the phenyl ring to any extent.

(f) indole- (2,2,3,3-tetramethylcyclopropyl)methanone, with substitution at the nitrogen atom of the indole ring, whether or not further substituted in the indole ring to any extent, whether or not substituted on the phenyl ring to any extent.

(g) N- adamantyl-indole-3-carboxamide, with substitution at the nitrogen atom of the indole ring, whether or not further substituted in the indole ring to any extent, whether or not substituted on the phenyl ring to any extent.

(h) (1,3-thiazol-2- ylidine)-2,2,3,3- tetramethylcyclopropane-1-carboxamide, with substitution to any extent at any position of the thiazolylidine ring.

...

• cannabicyclohexanol

== See also ==
- Synthetic cannabinoids
- 1,2-Didehydro-3-oxo-THCO
- (C6)-CP 47,497
- (C7)-CP 47,497 also known as CP 47,497
- (C9)-CP 47,497
- JWH-138
- O-1871
