= CP 47,497 =

Cannabinoid agonist compound

Legal status
- Legal status: CA: Schedule II; DE: Anlage II (Authorized trade only, not prescriptible); UK: Class B; US: Schedule I; Illegal in France, Latvia, Lithuania, Sweden, Romania

Identifiers
- IUPAC name: 2-[(1S,3R)-3-hydroxycyclohexyl]-5-(2-methyloctan-2-yl)phenol
- CAS Number: (1S,3R): 70434-82-1
- PubChem CID: (1S,3R): 125835; (1R,3S): 15942731
- ChemSpider: (1S,3R): 10205286; (1R,3S): 111910
- UNII: (1S,3R): FAPQAUKC04
- ChEMBL: (1S,3R): ChEMBL163701
- CompTox Dashboard (EPA): (1S,3R): DTXSID201017793 DTXSID401009968, DTXSID201017793

Chemical and physical data
- Formula: C_{21}H_{34}O_{2}
- Molar mass: 318.501 g·mol^{−1}
- 3D model (JSmol): (1S,3R): Interactive image; (1R,3S): Interactive image
- SMILES: (1S,3R): CCCCCCC(C)(C)c1ccc(c(c1)O)[C@H]2CCC[C@H](C2)O; (1R,3S): CCCCCCC(C)(C)c1ccc(c(c1)O)[C@@H]2CCC[C@@H](C2)O
- InChI: (1S,3R): InChI=1S/C21H34O2/c1-4-5-6-7-13-21(2,3)17-11-12-19(20(23)15-17)16-9-8-10-18(22)14-16/h11-12,15-16,18,22-23H,4-10,13-14H2,1-3H3/t16-,18+/m0/s1; Key:ZWWRREXSUJTKNN-FUHWJXTLSA-N; (1R,3S): InChI=1S/C21H34O2/c1-4-5-6-7-13-21(2,3)17-11-12-19(20(23)15-17)16-9-8-10-18(22)14-16/h11-12,15-16,18,22-23H,4-10,13-14H2,1-3H3/t16-,18+/m1/s1; Key:ZWWRREXSUJTKNN-AEFFLSMTSA-N

CP 47,497 or (C7)-CP 47,497 is a cannabinoid receptor agonist drug, developed by Pfizer in the 1980s. It has analgesic effects and is used in scientific research. It is a potent CB_{1} agonist with a K_{d} of 2.1 nM.

== Homologue ==
On the 19th of January 2009, the University of Freiburg in Germany announced that an analog of CP 47,497 is the main active ingredient in the herbal "incense" product Spice, specifically the 1,1-dimethyloctyl homologue of CP 47,497. Both the dimethylheptyl and dimethyloctyl homologues were detected in different batches, with considerable variation in the concentration present in different samples that were analysed. The weaker dimethylhexyl and dimethylnonyl homologues were not found in any batches of smoking blends tested, but have been legally scheduled alongside the others in some jurisdictions, to forestall any potential use for this purpose. The 1,1-dimethyloctyl homologue of CP 47,497 is several times more potent than the parent compound, which is somewhat unexpected as the 1,1-dimethylheptyl is the most potent substituent in classical cannabinoid compounds such as HU-210. The unapproved use of these compounds in herbal smoking blends has led to a resurgence in legitimate scientific research into their use, and consequently the C8 homologue of CP 47,497 has been assigned a proper name, cannabicyclohexanol.

== Legal status ==
=== Germany ===
On 22 January 2009, CP 47,497 was added to the German controlled drug schedules ("Betäubungsmittelgesetz"), along with its dimethylhexyl, dimethyloctyl and dimethylnonyl homologues.

=== France ===
CP 47,497 and its C6, C8, and C9 homologues were made illegal in France on 24 February 2009.

=== Latvia ===
CP 47,497 and its C6, C8, and C9 homologues were made illegal in Latvia on 28 November 2009.

=== Lithuania ===
CP 47,497 and its C6, C8, and C9 homologues were made illegal in Lithuania on 5 June 2009.

=== Sweden ===
CP 47,497 and its C6, C7, C8, and C9 homologues were made illegal in Sweden on 15 September 2009.

=== Romania ===
CP 47,497 and its C6, C7, C8, and C9 homologues were made illegal in Romania on 15 February 2010.("Illegal Substances in Romania after 15.02.2010". Archived from the original on 2010-03-27.

=== United States ===
As of March 1, 2011, it is a schedule 1 drug.

== See also ==
- (C6)-CP 47,497
- (C8)-CP 47,497 also known as Cannabicyclohexanol
- (C9)-CP 47,497
- HHC
- O-1871
