= APP-FUBINACA =

Chemical compound

Legal status
- Legal status: CA: Schedule II; DE: NpSG (Industrial and scientific use only); UK: Class B

Identifiers
- IUPAC name: N-(1-amino-3-phenyl-1-oxopropan-2-yl)-1-[(4-fluorophenyl)methyl]-1H-indazole-3-carboxamide
- CAS Number: 1185282-03-4
- PubChem CID: 58124515
- ChemSpider: 58789142
- UNII: TW71LSK9DG
- CompTox Dashboard (EPA): DTXSID501032568

Chemical and physical data
- Formula: C_{24}H_{21}FN_{4}O_{2}
- Molar mass: 416.456 g·mol^{−1}
- 3D model (JSmol): Interactive image
- SMILES: O=C(N[C@H](C(N)=O)CC1=CC=CC=C1)C2=NN(CC3=CC=C(F)C=C3)C4=C2C=CC=C4
- InChI: InChI=1S/C24H21FN4O2/c25-18-12-10-17(11-13-18)15-29-21-9-5-4-8-19(21)22(28-29)24(31)27-20(23(26)30)14-16-6-2-1-3-7-16/h1-13,20H,14-15H2,(H2,26,30)(H,27,31)/t20-/m0/s1; Key:TZXBEYFALIFOAG-FQEVSTJZSA-N

APP-FUBINACA is an indazole-based synthetic cannabinoid that has been sold online as a designer drug. Pharmacological testing showed APP-FUBINACA to have only moderate affinity for the CB_{1} receptor, with a Ki of 708 nM, while its EC_{50} was not tested. It contains a phenylalanine amino acid residue in its structure.

== Legality ==
Sweden's public health agency suggested to classify APP-FUBINACA as hazardous substance on March 24, 2015.

== See also ==
- 5F-AB-PINACA
- 5F-ADB
- 5F-AMB
- 5F-APINACA
- AB-FUBINACA
- AB-CHFUPYCA
- AB-CHMINACA
- AB-PINACA
- ADB-CHMINACA
- ADB-FUBINACA
- ADB-PINACA
- ADBICA
- APICA
- APINACA
- APP-BINACA
- BMS-F
- MDMB-CHMICA
- MDMB-FUBINACA
- PX-1
- PX-2
- PX-3
