= PX-2 =

Chemical compound

Legal status
- Legal status: CA: Schedule II; DE: NpSG (Industrial and scientific use only); UK: Class B; Illegal in China, Singapore, Sweden

Identifiers
- IUPAC name: (S)-N-(1-amino-1-oxo-3-phenylpropan-2-yl)-1-(5-fluoropentyl)-1H-indazole-3-carboxamide
- CAS Number: 2365471-47-0
- ChemSpider: 32741702
- UNII: MJ9UWE9QAR

Chemical and physical data
- Formula: C_{22}H_{25}FN_{4}O_{2}
- Molar mass: 396.466 g·mol^{−1}
- 3D model (JSmol): Interactive image
- SMILES: O=C(N[C@@H](C(N)=O)CC1=CC=CC=C1)C2=NN(CCCCCF)C3=C2C=CC=C3
- InChI: InChI=1S/C22H25FN4O2/c23-13-7-2-8-14-27-19-12-6-5-11-17(19)20(26-27)22(29)25-18(21(24)28)15-16-9-3-1-4-10-16/h1,3-6,9-12,18H,2,7-8,13-15H2,(H2,24,28)(H,25,29)/t18-/m1/s1; Key:OJTAHWMZBJRSIR-GOSISDBHSA-N

PX-2 (also known as 5F-APP-PINACA, FU-PX and PPA(N)-2201) is an indazole-based synthetic cannabinoid that has been sold online as a designer drug. It contains a phenylalanine amino acid amide as part of its structure.

== Legality ==
Sweden's public health agency suggested classifying PX-2 as hazardous substance on November 10, 2014.

PX-2 is listed in the Fifth Schedule of the Misuse of Drugs Act (MDA) and therefore illegal in Singapore as of May 2015.

As of October 2015 PX-2 is a controlled substance in China.

== See also ==
- 5F-AB-PINACA
- 5F-ADB
- 5F-AMB
- 5F-APINACA
- AB-FUBINACA
- AB-CHFUPYCA
- AB-CHMINACA
- AB-PINACA
- ADB-CHMINACA
- ADB-FUBINACA
- ADB-PINACA
- ADBICA
- APICA
- APINACA
- MDMB-CHMICA
- PX-1
- PX-3
