= PX-1 =

Chemical compound

Legal status
- Legal status: CA: Schedule II; DE: NpSG (Industrial and scientific use only); UK: Class B

Identifiers
- IUPAC name: (S)-N-(1-amino-1-oxo-3-phenylpropan-2-yl)-1-(5-fluoropentyl)-1H-indole-3-carboxamide
- CAS Number: 2221100-71-4
- PubChem CID: 125181260
- ChemSpider: 32055575
- UNII: BJ7SBQ2H5I

Chemical and physical data
- Formula: C_{23}H_{26}FN_{3}O_{2}
- Molar mass: 395.478 g·mol^{−1}
- 3D model (JSmol): Interactive image
- SMILES: O=C(N[C@H](C(N)=O)CC1=CC=CC=C1)C2=CN(CCCCCF)C3=C2C=CC=C3
- InChI: InChI=1S/C23H26FN3O2/c24-13-7-2-8-14-27-16-19(18-11-5-6-12-21(18)27)23(29)26-20(22(25)28)15-17-9-3-1-4-10-17/h1,3-6,9-12,16,20H,2,7-8,13-15H2,(H2,25,28)(H,26,29)/t20-/m0/s1; Key:DDVANTXQCRMRFF-FQEVSTJZSA-N

PX-1 (also known as 5F-APP-PICA and SRF-30) is an indole-based synthetic cannabinoid that has been sold online as a designer drug.

== Legality ==
Sweden's public health agency suggested classifying PX-1 as hazardous substance on November 10, 2014.

PX-1 is listed in the Fifth Schedule of the Misuse of Drugs Act (MDA) and therefore illegal in Singapore as of May 2015.

== See also ==
- 5F-AB-PINACA
- 5F-ADB
- 5F-AMB
- 5F-APINACA
- AB-FUBINACA
- AB-CHFUPYCA
- AB-CHMINACA
- AB-PINACA
- ADB-CHMINACA
- ADB-FUBINACA
- ADB-PINACA
- ADBICA
- APICA
- APINACA
- MDMB-CHMICA
- PX-2
- PX-3
