= MDMB-FUBINACA =

Chemical compound

Legal status
- Legal status: CA: Schedule II; DE: NpSG (Industrial and scientific use only); UK: Class B; US: Schedule I

Identifiers
- IUPAC name: Methyl (2S)-2-{[1-(4-fluorobenzyl)indazole-3-carbonyl]amino}-3,3-dimethylbutanoate
- CAS Number: 1971007-93-8
- PubChem CID: 119025665
- ChemSpider: 32741674
- UNII: 544DR70TN4
- CompTox Dashboard (EPA): DTXSID301355877 DTXSID501010003, DTXSID301355877

Chemical and physical data
- Formula: C_{22}H_{24}FN_{3}O_{3}
- Molar mass: 397.450 g·mol^{−1}
- 3D model (JSmol): Interactive image
- SMILES: O=C(N[C@H](C(OC)=O)C(C)(C)C)C1=NN(CC2=CC=C(F)C=C2)C3=C1C=CC=C3
- InChI: InChI=1S/C22H24FN3O3/c1-22(2,3)19(21(28)29-4)24-20(27)18-16-7-5-6-8-17(16)26(25-18)13-14-9-11-15(23)12-10-14/h5-12,19H,13H2,1-4H3,(H,24,27)/t19-/m1/s1; Key:RFCDVEHNYDVCMU-LJQANCHMSA-N

MDMB-FUBINACA (also known as MDMB(N)-Bz-F and FUB-MDMB) is an indazole-based synthetic cannabinoid that is a potent agonist for cannabinoid receptors and that has been sold online as a designer drug. The structure of MDMB-FUBINACA contains the npAA L-tert-Leucine. MDMB-FUBINACA has K_{i} values of 1.14nM at CB_{1} and 0.1228nM at CB_{2} and EC_{50} values of 0.2668nM at CB_{1} and 0.1411nM at CB_{2.}

== Side effects ==
There have been a large number of reported cases of deaths and hospitalizations in relation to this chemical, mainly in Russia and Belarus. MDMB-FUBINACA was first reported in 2014 and quickly gained a reputation as the most deadly synthetic cannabinoid drug sold by 2015. Up to 700 hospitalisations and 25 deaths were initially linked to MDMB-FUBINACA in media and government reports, and a subsequent published study confirmed that at least 1000 hospitalizations and 40 deaths had occurred as a consequence of intoxication by MDMB-FUBINACA as of March 2015.

== Legal status ==
In the United States, MDMB-FUBINACA is a Schedule I controlled substance.

As of October 2015, MDMB-FUBINACA is a controlled substance in Belarus, Russia, and China.

In July 2021, it was included in Table II-A in the list of prohibited drugs of Portugal.

== See also ==
- The tetrahydro analogue MDMB-FUBTHINACA was detected in France and Czechia in 2026.
- 5F-AB-PINACA
- 5F-ADB
- 5F-AMB
- 5F-APINACA
- AB-FUBINACA
- AB-CHFUPYCA
- AB-CHMINACA
- AB-PINACA
- ADB-BINACA
- ADB-CHMINACA
- ADB-FUBINACA
- ADB-PINACA
- ADBICA
- APICA
- APINACA
- APP-FUBINACA
- MDMB-CHMICA
- MDMB-CHMINACA
- PX-3
- VIP36
