= MMB-2201 =

Chemical compound

Legal status
- Legal status: CA: Schedule II; DE: Anlage II (Authorized trade only, not prescriptible); UK: Class B

Identifiers
- IUPAC name: (S)-Methyl 2-(1-(5-fluoropentyl)-1H-indole-3-carboxamido)-3-methylbutanoate
- CAS Number: 1616253-26-9
- PubChem CID: 119058037
- ChemSpider: 30922499
- UNII: 744M0WHE80
- CompTox Dashboard (EPA): DTXSID501342492

Chemical and physical data
- Formula: C_{20}H_{27}FN_{2}O_{3}
- Molar mass: 362.445 g·mol^{−1}
- 3D model (JSmol): Interactive image
- SMILES: CC(C)[C@@H](C(=O)OC)NC(=O)c1cn(c2c1cccc2)CCCCCF
- InChI: InChI=1S/C20H27FN2O3/c1-14(2)18(20(25)26-3)22-19(24)16-13-23(12-8-4-7-11-21)17-10-6-5-9-15(16)17/h5-6,9-10,13-14,18H,4,7-8,11-12H2,1-3H3,(H,22,24)/t18-/m0/s1; Key:JFXASAFVUQVGEW-SFHVURJKSA-N

MMB-2201 (also known as MMB-5F-PICA, 5F-MMB-PICA, 5F-AMB-PICA, and I-AMB) is a potent indole-3-carboxamide based synthetic cannabinoid, which has been sold as a designer drug and as an active ingredient in synthetic cannabis blends. It was first reported in Russia and Belarus in January 2014, but has since been sold in a number of other countries. In the United States, MMB-2201 was identified in Drug Enforcement Administration drug seizures for the first time in 2018.

MMB-2201 is the indole core analogue of 5F-AMB. Synthetic cannabinoid compounds with an indole-3-carboxamide or indazole-3-carboxamide core bearing a N-1-methoxycarbonyl group with attached isopropyl or tert-butyl substituent, have proved to be much more dangerous than older synthetic cannabinoid compounds previously reported, and have been linked to many deaths in Russia, Japan, Europe and the United States.

== Legality ==
MMB-2201 is illegal in Russia, Belarus and Sweden.

== See also ==
- 5F-AB-PINACA
- 5F-ADB
- MDMB-CHMICA
- MDMB-CHMINACA
- MDMB-FUBINACA
