= C19H28N4O2 =

The molecular formula C_{19}H_{28}N_{4}O_{2} (molar mass: 344.459 g/mol) may refer to:

- ADB-PINACA
- ADB-P7AICA
