= AB-CHMINACA =

Chemical compound

Legal status
- Legal status: BR: Class F2 (Prohibited psychotropics); CA: Schedule II; DE: Anlage II (Authorized trade only, not prescriptible); UK: Class B; US: Schedule I; UN: Psychotropic Schedule II; Illegal in China and Switzerland

Identifiers
- IUPAC name: N-[(2S)-1-Amino-3-methyl-1-oxobutan-2-yl]-1-(cyclohexylmethyl)indazole-3-carboxamide
- CAS Number: 1185887-21-1
- PubChem CID: 44206133
- ChemSpider: 30646774
- UNII: QG3J28E7L8
- KEGG: C22702
- CompTox Dashboard (EPA): DTXSID101009983

Chemical and physical data
- Formula: C_{20}H_{28}N_{4}O_{2}
- Molar mass: 356.470 g·mol^{−1}
- 3D model (JSmol): Interactive image
- SMILES: CC(C)[C@H](NC(=O)c1nn(CC2CCCCC2)c3ccccc13)C(N)=O
- InChI: InChI=1S/C20H28N4O2/c1-13(2)17(19(21)25)22-20(26)18-15-10-6-7-11-16(15)24(23-18)12-14-8-4-3-5-9-14/h6-7,10-11,13-14,17H,3-5,8-9,12H2,1-2H3,(H2,21,25)(H,22,26)/t17-/m0/s1; Key:KJNZIEGLNLCWTQ-KRWDZBQOSA-N

AB-CHMINACA is an indazole-based synthetic cannabinoid. It is a potent agonist of the CB_{1} receptor (K_{i} = 0.78 nM) and CB_{2} receptor (K_{i} = 0.45 nM) and fully substitutes for Δ^{9}-THC in rat discrimination studies, while being 16x more potent. Continuing the trend seen in other cannabinoids of this generation, such as AB-FUBINACA and AB-PINACA, it contains a valine amino acid amide residue as part of its structure, where older cannabinoids contained a naphthyl or adamantane residue.

== Side effects ==
There have been a number of reported cases of seizures, deaths, and psychotic episodes in relation to this synthetic cannabinoid.

== Legal status ==
In 2015, AB-CHMINACA became a Schedule I controlled substance in the United States.

AB-CHMINACA is an Anlage II controlled substance in Germany as of May 2015.

As of October 2015 AB-CHMINACA is a controlled substance in China.

AB-CHMINACA is illegal in Switzerland as of December 2015.

AB-CHMINACA is an illegal substance in Russian Federation.

== See also ==
- 5F-AB-PINACA
- 5F-ADB
- 5F-AMB
- A-CHMINACA
- AB-FUBINACA
- AB-CHFUPYCA
- AB-PINACA
- ADB-CHMINACA
- ADB-FUBINACA
- ADB-PINACA
- ADBICA
- APICA
- APINACA
- MDMB-CHMICA
- MDMB-CHMINACA
- MDMB-FUBINACA
- PX-3
