= VIP36 =

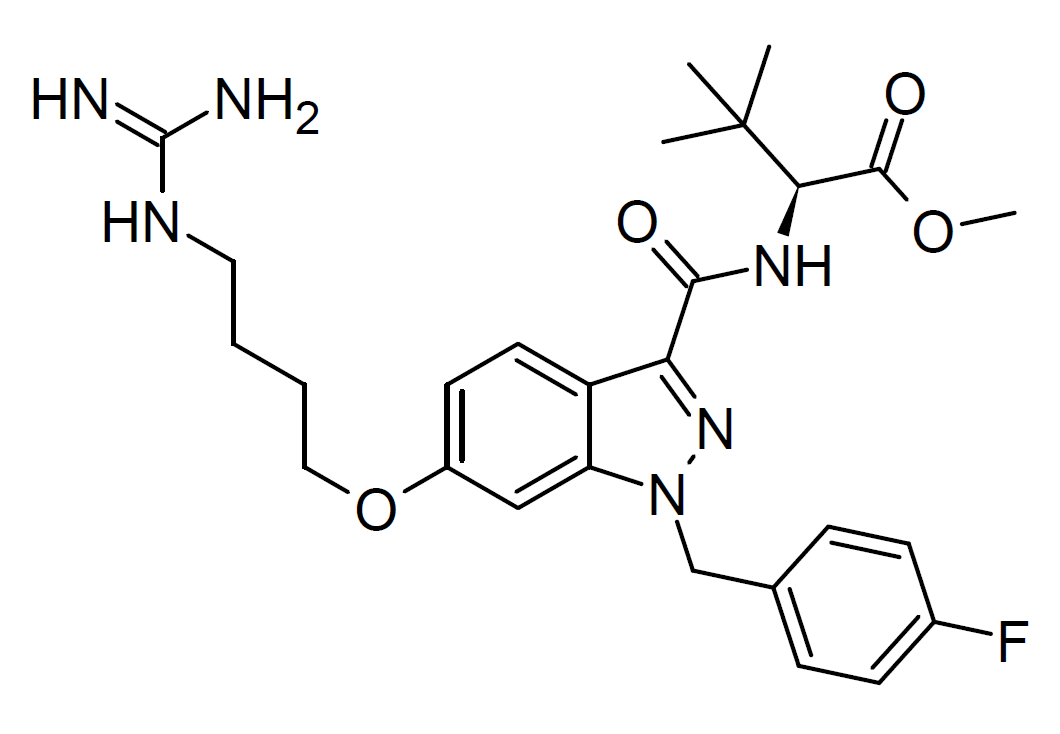

Identifiers
- IUPAC name: methyl (2S)-2-{[6-[4-(diaminomethylideneamino)butoxy]-1-[(4-fluorophenyl)methyl]indazole-3-carbonyl]amino}-3,3-dimethylbutanoate
- PubChem CID: 172677805

Chemical and physical data
- Formula: C_{27}H_{35}FN_{6}O_{4}
- Molar mass: 526.613 g·mol^{−1}
- 3D model (JSmol): Interactive image
- SMILES: CC(C)(C)[C@@H](C(=O)OC)NC(=O)C1=NN(C2=C1C=CC(=C2)OCCCCN=C(N)N)CC3=CC=C(C=C3)F
- InChI: InChI=1S/C27H35FN6O4/c1-27(2,3)23(25(36)37-4)32-24(35)22-20-12-11-19(38-14-6-5-13-31-26(29)30)15-21(20)34(33-22)16-17-7-9-18(28)10-8-17/h7-12,15,23H,5-6,13-14,16H2,1-4H3,(H,32,35)(H4,29,30,31)/t23-/m1/s1; Key:WMOAPWVQPPIAFY-HSZRJFAPSA-N

VIP36 is a synthetic cannabinoid derivative, closely related to the highly potent and neurotoxic designer drug MDMB-FUBINACA. However, unlike MDMB-FUBINACA, VIP36 has a positively charged N-alkoxyguanidine group attached which prevents it from crossing the blood-brain barrier. As a result, VIP36 is a highly peripherally selective drug - neurotoxic effects only became evident at 100x the estimated effective dose needed for analgesia.

== See also ==
- AZ-11713908
- CB-13
- MDMB-BINACA
- MDMB-CHMINACA
- MDMB-4en-PINACA
