= A-PBITMO =

Chemical compound

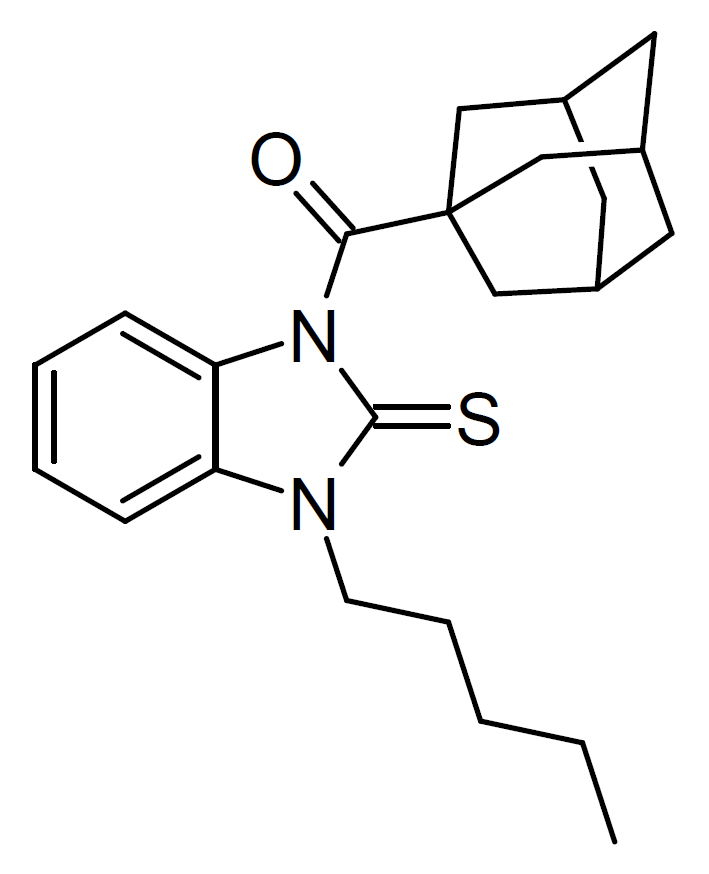

Identifiers
- IUPAC name: (Adamantan-1-yl)(3-pentyl-2-thioxo-2,3-dihydro-1H-benzo[d]imidazol-1-yl)methanone
- CAS Number: none

Chemical and physical data
- Formula: C_{23}H_{30}N_{2}OS
- Molar mass: 382.57 g·mol^{−1}
- 3D model (JSmol): Interactive image
- SMILES: S=C1N(C(=O)C23CC4CC(C2)CC(C3)C4)c2ccccc2N1CCCCC
- InChI: InChI=1S/C23H30N2OS/c1-2-3-6-9-24-19-7-4-5-8-20(19)25(22(24)27)21(26)23-13-16-10-17(14-23)12-18(11-16)15-23/h4-5,7-8,16-18H,2-3,6,9-15H2,1H3; Key:VUROLZZLDVMOQX-UHFFFAOYSA-N

A-PBITMO is a synthetic cannabinoid receptor agonist that has been sold as a designer drug, first reported in Germany in July 2023, and also subsequently identified in Russia. It has an unusual 1,3-dihydrobenzimidazole-2-thione core structure which has not previously been seen in cannabinoid designer drugs.

== See also ==
- A-PONASA
- AB-001
- AM-1248
- APINACA
- FUBIMINA
- PF-03550096
