= A-PONASA =

Chemical compound

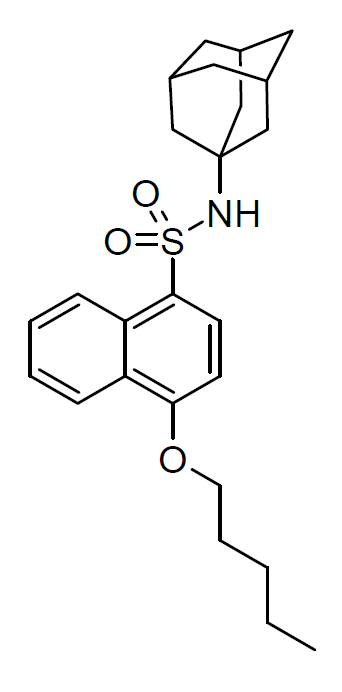

Identifiers
- IUPAC name: N-(adamantan-1-yl)-4-(pentyloxy)naphthalene-1-sulfonamide
- PubChem CID: 170915645
- ChemSpider: 129341100

Chemical and physical data
- Formula: C_{25}H_{33}NO_{3}S
- Molar mass: 427.60 g·mol^{−1}
- 3D model (JSmol): Interactive image
- SMILES: CCCCCOc1ccc(c2ccccc21)S(=O)(=O)NC12CC3CC(C1)CC(C2)C3
- InChI: InChI=1S/C25H33NO3S/c1-2-3-6-11-29-23-9-10-24(22-8-5-4-7-21(22)23)30(27,28)26-25-15-18-12-19(16-25)14-20(13-18)17-25/h4-5,7-10,18-20,26H,2-3,6,11-17H2,1H3; Key:KDLJELWGBJUNBO-UHFFFAOYSA-N

A-PONASA is a synthetic cannabinoid receptor agonist that has been sold as a designer drug. It is closely related to the previously reported compound CB-13 but with the naphthalene head group replaced with adamantyl, and an unusual sulfonamide linker group.

== See also ==
- A-PBITMO
- AZD-1940
- 2F-QMPSB
