= 7-Nitroindazole =

Names
- Preferred IUPAC name 7-Nitro-1H-indazole

Identifiers
CAS Number	2942-42-9
3D model (JSmol)	Interactive image
ChEBI	CHEBI:40287
ChEMBL	ChEMBL247378
ChemSpider	1821
ECHA InfoCard	100.019.032
IUPHAR/BPS	5127
PubChem CID	1893
UNII	UX0N37CMVH
CompTox Dashboard (EPA)	DTXSID30183638
- InChI: InChI=1S/C7H5N3O2/c11-10(12)6-3-1-2-5-4-8-9-7(5)6/h1-4H,(H,8,9) Key: PQCAUHUKTBHUSA-UHFFFAOYSA-N; InChI=1/C7H5N3O2/c11-10(12)6-3-1-2-5-4-8-9-7(5)6/h1-4H,(H,8,9) Key: PQCAUHUKTBHUSA-UHFFFAOYAE
- SMILES: [O-][N+](=O)c1cccc2c1[nH]nc2

Properties
Chemical formula	C_{7}H_{5}N_{3}O_{2}
Molar mass	163.1335
- Except where otherwise noted, data are given for materials in their standard state (at 25 °C [77 °F], 100 kPa). verify (what is ?) Infobox references

7-Nitroindazole, or 7-NI, is a heterocyclic small molecule containing an indazole ring that has been nitrated at the 7 position. Nitroindazole acts as a selective inhibitor for neuronal nitric oxide synthase, a hemoprotein enzyme that, in neuronal tissue, converts arginine to citrulline and nitric oxide (NO). Nitric oxide can diffuse through the plasma membrane into neighbouring cells, allowing cell signalling, so nitroindazole indirectly inhibits this signalling process. Other inhibitors exist such as 3-bromo-7-nitroindazole, which is more potent but less specific, or N-propyl-L-arginine (NPA), which acts on a different site.

== Pharmacology ==
7-Nitroindazole is under investigation as a possible protective agent against nerve damage caused by excitotoxicity or neurodegenerative diseases. It may act by reducing oxidative stress or by decreasing the amount of peroxynitrite formed in these tissues. These effects are related to the inhibition of type 1 nitric oxide synthase. However, anticonvulsive effect is derived from some other mechanisms.

== See also ==
- Dizocilpine (MK-801) a non-competitive antagonist of the NMDA receptor
- Sildenafil a drug for impotence, which inhibits cGMP specific phosphodiesterase type 5 (PDE5), which is responsible for degradation of cGMP, which is produced by guanylate cyclase, which is activated by nitric oxide produced by eNOS
- Tetrahydrobiopterin, cofactor to several enzymes including nitric oxide synthase (NOS)
- Protein kinase A (PKA) and protein kinase C (PKC)
