= PX-3 =

Chemical compound

Legal status
- Legal status: CA: Schedule II; DE: NpSG (Industrial and scientific use only); UK: Class B; Illegal in Sweden

Identifiers
- IUPAC name: N-[(2S)-1-amino-1-oxo-3-phenylpropan-2-yl]-1-(cyclohexylmethyl)indazole-3-carboxamide
- CAS Number: 1185887-14-2
- PubChem CID: 44206137
- ChemSpider: 48063640
- UNII: 3877T06H05
- CompTox Dashboard (EPA): DTXSID201009998

Chemical and physical data
- Formula: C_{24}H_{28}N_{4}O_{2}
- Molar mass: 404.514 g·mol^{−1}
- 3D model (JSmol): Interactive image
- SMILES: NC(=O)[C@H](Cc1ccccc1)NC(=O)c2nn(CC3CCCCC3)c4ccccc24
- InChI: InChI=1S/C24H28N4O2/c25-23(29)20(15-17-9-3-1-4-10-17)26-24(30)22-19-13-7-8-14-21(19)28(27-22)16-18-11-5-2-6-12-18/h1,3-4,7-10,13-14,18,20H,2,5-6,11-12,15-16H2,(H2,25,29)(H,26,30)/t20-/m0/s1; Key:DMHWDSGURMXMGE-FQEVSTJZSA-N

PX-3 (also known as APP-CHMINACA) is an indazole-based synthetic cannabinoid. It is a potent agonist of the CB_{1} receptor with a binding affinity of K_{i} = 47.6 nM and was originally developed by Pfizer in 2009 as an analgesic medication.

The acronym 'APP' signifies the 'amino', 'phenyl' and 'propanone' elements of the structure. Three related compounds, PX-1 (5F-APP-PICA, SRF-30), PX-2 (5F-APP-PINACA, FU-PX) and APP-FUBINACA were reported by the EMCDDA in late 2014.

== Legality ==
Sweden's public health agency suggested to classify APP-CHMINACA as hazardous substance on June 1, 2015.

== See also ==
- 5F-AB-PINACA
- 5F-ADB
- 5F-AMB
- 5F-APINACA
- AB-FUBINACA
- AB-CHFUPYCA
- AB-CHMINACA
- AB-PINACA
- ADB-CHMINACA
- ADB-FUBINACA
- ADB-PINACA
- ADBICA
- APICA
- APINACA
- MDMB-CHMICA
- PX-1
- PX-2
