= Drugs controlled by the German Narcotic Drugs Act =

The following drugs are controlled by the German Narcotic Drugs Act (German: Betäubungsmittelgesetz or BtMG). Trade and possession of these substances without licence or prescription is considered illegal; prescription is illegal for drugs on Anlage I and II and drugs on Anlage III require a special prescription form.

== Anlage I ==
Anlage I controlled substances are non-tradable without a permit from the German government, granted only for scientific or other public interest purposes.

INN	Trivial name	German IUPAC
Acetorphine		{4,5a-Epoxy-7a-[(R)-2-hydroxypentan-2-yl]-6-methoxy-17-methyl-6,14-ethenomorphinan-3-yl}acetat
	Acetyldihydrocodeine	(4,5a-Epoxy-3-methoxy-17-methylmorphinan-6a-yl)acetat
Acetylmethadol		(6-Dimethylamino-4,4-diphenyl-heptan-3-yl)acetat
	α-Methylacetylfentanyl	N-Phenyl-N-[1-(1-phenyl-propan-2-yl)-4-piperidyl]acetamid
	Allylescaline	4-Allyloxy-3,5-dimethoxy-phenethylazan
Allylprodine		(3-Allyl-1-methyl-4-phenyl-4-piperidyl)propionat
Alphacetylmethadol		[(3R,6R)-6-Dimethylamino-4,4-diphenylheptan-3-yl]acetat
Alphameprodine		[(3RS,4SR)-3-Ethyl-1-methyl-4-phenyl-4-piperidyl]propionat
Alphamethadol		(3R,6R)-6-Dimethylamino-4,4-diphenylheptan-3-ol
Alphaprodine		[(3RS,4SR)-1,3-Dimethyl-4-phenyl-4-piperidyl]propionat
	5-IT (5-API)	1-(1H-Indol-5-yl)propan-2-amin
Anileridine		Ethyl[1-(4-aminophenethyl)-4-phenyl-piperidin-4-carboxylat)
	BDB	1-(1,3-Benzodioxol-5-yl)butan-2-ylazan
Benzethidine		Ethyl{1-[2-benzyloxy)ethyl]-4-phenyl-piperidin-4-carboxylat}
Benzphetamine		(Benzyl)(methyl)(1-phenylpropan-2-yl)azan
	3',4'-Methylenedioxy-α-pyrrolidinopropiophenone (MDPPP)	1-(1,3-Benzodioxol-5-yl)-2-(pyrrolidin-1-yl)propan-1-on
	Benzylfentanyl	N-(1-Benzyl-4-piperidyl)-N-phenyl-propanamid
	Benzylmorphine	3-Benzyloxy-4,5a-epoxy-17-methylmorphin-7-en-6a-ol
Betacetylmethadol		[(3S,6R)-6-Dimethylamino-4,4-diphenylheptan-3-yl]acetat
Betameprodine		[(3RS,4RS)-3-Ethyl-1-methyl-4-phenyl-4-piperidyl]propionat
Betamethadol		(3S,6R)-6-Dimethylamino-4,4-diphenylheptan-3-ol
Betaprodine		[(3RS,4RS)-1,3-Dimethyl-4-phenyl-4-piperidyl]propionat
Bezitramide		4-[4-(2-Oxo-3-propionyl-2,3-dihydrobenzimidazol-1-yl)piperidino]-2,2,-diphenyl-butannitril
	25B-NBOMe (2C-B-NBOMe)	2-(4-Brom-2,5-dimethoxyphenyl)-N-[(2-methoxyphenyl)methyl]ethanamin
	25N-NBOMe (2C-N-NBOMe)	2-(2,5-Dimethoxy-4-nitrophenyl)-N-[(2-methoxyphenyl)methyl]ethanamin
Brolamphetamine	Dimethoxybromamphetamine (DOB)	(RS)-1-(4-Brom-2,5-dimethoxy-phenyl)propan-2-ylazan
	2C-B (BDMPEA)	4-Brom-2,5-dimethoxyphenethyl-azan
	Cannabis (Marijuana, plants of the species Cannabis) (Except for Cannabis permitted under Anlage III)	
	Hashish	
Carfentanil		Methyl[1-phenethyl-4-(N-phenyl-propanamido)piperidin-4-carboxylat]
Cathinone		(S)-2-Amino-1-phenylpropan-1-on
	2C-C	2-(4-Chlor-2,5-dimethoxyphenyl)ethanamin
	2C-D (2C-M)	2-(2,5-Dimethoxy-4-methylphenyl)ethanamin
	2C-E	2-(4-Ethyl-2,5-dimethoxyphenyl)ethanamin
	2C-I	4-lod-2,5-dimethoxyphenethyl-azan
	6-Cl-MDMA	[1-(6-Chlor-1,3-benzodioxol-5-yl)propan-2-yl](methyl)azan
	Clephedrone ( 4-CMC, 4-Chloromethcathinone)	1-(4-Chlorphenyl)-2-(methylamino)propan-1-on
Clonitazene		{2-[2-(4-Chlorbenzyl)-5-nitrobenzimidazol-1-yl]ethyl}diethylazan
	25C-NBOMe (2C-C-NBOMe)	2-(4-Chlor-2,5-dimethoxyphenyl)-N-[(2-methoxyphenyl)methyl]ethanamin
	Codeine-N-oxide	4,5a-Epoxy-3-methoxy-17-methylmorphin-7-en-6a-ol-17-oxid
Codoxime		(4,5a-Epoxy-3-methoxy-17-methylmorphinan-6-yliden-aminooxy)essigsäure
	2C-P	2-(2,5-Dimethoxy-4-propylphenyl)ethanamin
	2C-T-2	4-Ethylsulfanyl-2,5-dimethoxy-phenetylazan
	2C-T-7	2,5-Dimethoxy-4-(propylsulfanyl)phenethylazan
Desomorphine	Dihydrodesoxymorphine	4,5a-Epoxy-17-methyl-morphinan-3-ol
Diampromide		N-{2-[(Methyl)(phenetyl)amino]propyl}-N-phenylpropanamid
	Diethoxybromoamphetamine	1-(4-Brom-2,5-diethoxyphenyl)propan-2-ylazan
Diethylthiambutene		Diethyl(1-methyl-3,3-di-2-thienylallyl)azan
	N,N-Diethyltryptamine (Diethyltryptamine, DET)	Diethyl[2-(indol-3-yl)ethyl]azan
	Dihydroetorphine (18,19-Dihydroetorphine)	(5R,6R,7R,14R)-4,5a-Epoxy-7a-[(R)-2-hydroxypentan-2-yl]-6-methoxy-17-methyl-6,14-ethanomorphinan-3-ol
Dimenoxadol		(2-Dimethylaminoethyl)[(ethoxy)(diphenyl)acetat]
Dimepheptanol	Methadole	6-Dimethylamino-4,4-diphenyl-heptan-3-ol
	Dimethoxyamphetamine (DMA)	1-(2,5-Dimethoxyphenyl)propan-2-ylazan
	Dimethoxyethylamphetamine (DOET)	1-(4-Ethyl-2,5-dimethoxyphenyl)propan-2-ylazan
	Dimethoxymethamphetamine (DMMA)	1-(3,4-Dimethoxyphenyl)-N-methylpropan-2-amin
	Dimethoxymethylamphetamine (DOM, STP)	(RS)-1-(2,5-Dimethoxy-4-methylphenyl)propan-2-ylazan
	Dimethylheptyltetrahydrocannabinol (DMHP)	6,6,9-Trimethyl-3-(3-methyl-octan-2-yl)-7,8,9,10-tetra-hydro-6H-benzo(c) chromen-1-ol
Dimethylthiambutene		Dimethyl(1-methyl-3,3-di-2-thienylallyl)azan
	N,N-Dimethyltryptamine (Dimethyltryptamine, DMT)	[2-(Indol-3-yl) ethyl]dimethyl-azan
Dioxaphetylbutyrate		Ethyl-(4-morpholino-2,2-diphenylbutanoat)
Dipipanone		4,4-Diphenyl-6-piperidinoheptan-3-on
	DOC	1-(4-Chlor-2,5-dimethoxyphenyl)propan-2-ylazan
Drotebanol		3,4-Dimethoxy-17-methyl-morphinan-6β,14-diol
	N-Ethylbuphedrone (NEB)	2-(Ethylamino)-1-phenylbutan-1-on
	4-Ethylmethcathinone (4-EMC)	1-(4-Ethylphenyl)-2-(methylamino)propan-1-on
Ethylmethylthiambutene		(Ethyl)(methyl)(1-methyl-3,3-di-2-thienylallyl)azan
	Ethylone (βk-MDEA, MDEC)	1-(1,3-Benzodioxol-5-yl)-2-(ethylamino)propan-1-on
	Ethylpiperidylbenzilate	(1-Ethyl-3-piperidyl)benzilat
Eticyclidine	PCE	(Ethyl(1-phenylcyclohexyl)azan
Etonitazene		{2-[2-(4-Ethoxybenzyl)-5-nitrobenzimidazol-1-yl]ethyl}diethylazan
Etoxeridine		Ethyl{1-[2-(2-hydroxyethoxy)ethyl]-4-phenylpiperidin-4-carboxylat}
Etryptamine	α-Ethyltryptamine	1-(Indol-3-yl)butan-2-ylazan
	FLEA	N-[1-(1,3-Benzodioxol-5-yl)propan-2-yl]-N-methyl-hydroxylamin
	4-Fluoroamphetamine (4-FA, 4-FMP)	(RS)-1-(4-Fluorphenyl)propan-2-amin
	4-Fluorofentanyl	N-(4-Fluorphenyl)-N-(1-phenethyl-4-piperidyl)propanamid
	2-Fluoromethamphetamine (2-FMA)	1-(2-Fluorphenyl)-N-methylpropan-2-amin
	3-Fluoromethamphetamine (3-FMA)	1-(3-Fluorphenyl)-N-methylpropan-2-amin
Furethidine		Ethyl{4-phenyl-1-[2-tetra-hydrofurfuryloxy)ethyl]piperidin-4-carboxylat}
	Heroin (Diacetylmorphin, Diamorphine); except for use permitted under Anlage II and Anlage III (under the name Diamorphine)	[(5R,6S)-4,5-Epoxy-17-methyl-morphin-7-en-3,6-diyl]diacetat
Hydromorphinol	14-Hydroxydihydromorphin	4,5a-Epoxy-17-methyl-morphinan-3,6a,14-triol
	N-Hydroxyamphetamine (NOHA)	N-(1-Phenylpropan-2-yl)hydroxylamin
	β-Hydroxyfentanyl	N-[1-(2-Hydroxy-2-phenyl-ethyl)-4-piperidyl]-N-phenylpropanamid
	Methylenedioxyhydroxyamphetamine (N-Hydroxy-MDA, MDOH)	N-[1-(1,3-Benzodioxol-5-yl) propan-2-yl]hydroxylamin
	β-Hydroxy-3-methyl-fentanyl (Ohmefentanyl)	N-[1-(2-Hydroxy-2-phenyl-ethyl)-3-methyl-4-piperidyl]-N-phenylpropanamid
Hydroxypethidine		Ethyl[4-(3-hydroxyphenyl)-1-methylpiperidin-4-carboxylat]
	25I-NBOMe (2C-I-NBOMe)	2-(4-lod-2,5-dimethoxyphenyl)-N-[(2-methoxyphenyl)methyl]ethanamin
Lefetamine	SPA	[(R)-1,2-Diphenylethyl]dimethylazan
Levomethorphan		(9R,13R,14R)-3-Methoxy-17-methylmorphinan
Levophenacylmorphan		2-[(9R,13R,14R)-3-Hydroxy-morphinan-17-yl]-1-phenyl-ethanon
Lofentanil		Methyl[(3R,4S)-3-methyl-1-phenethyl-4-(N-phenyl-propanamido)piperidin-4-carboxylat]
Lysergide	N,N-Diethyl-D-lysergamide (LSD, LSD-25)	N,N-Diethyl-6-methyl-9,10-didehydroergolin-8β-carboxamid
	Methallylescaline (MAL)	3,5-Dimethoxy-4-(2-methyl-allyloxy)phenethylazan
	MBDB	[1-(1,3-Benzodioxol-5-yl)butan-2-yl](methyl)azan
	Mebroqualone	3-(2-Bromphenyl)2-methyl-chinazolin-4(3H)-on
Mecloqualone		3-(2-Chlorphenyl)-2-methyl-chinazolin-4(3H)-on
	Mescaline	3,4,5-Trimethoxyphenethylazan
Metazocine		3,6,11-Trimethyl-1,2,3,4,5,6-hexahydro-2,6-methano-3-benzazocin-8-ol
	Methcathinone (Ephedrone)	2-Methylamino-1-phenylpropan-1-on
	Methiopropamine (MPA)	N-Methyl-1-(thiophen-2-yl)propan-2-amin
	Methoxetamine (MXE)	2-(Ethylamino)-2-(3-methoxyphenyl)cyclohexanon
	Methoxyamphetamine (PMA)	1-(4-Methoxyphenyl)propan-2-ylazan
	5-Methoxy-diisopropyltryptamine (5-MeO-DIPT)	Diisopropyl[2-(5-methoxyindol-3-yl)ethyl]azan
	5-Methoxy-DMT (5-MeO-DMT)	[2-(5-Methoxyindol-3-yl)ethyl]dimethylazan
	Methoxymethamphetamine (PMMA)	[1-(4-Methoxyphenyl)propan-2-yl](methyl)azan
	Methoxymethylenedioxyamphetamine (MMDA)	1-(7-Methoxy-1,3-benzodioxol-5-yl)propan-2–ylazan
	PCMPA	(3-Methoxypropyl)(1-phenyl-cyclohexyl)azan
	Methylaminorex (4-Methylaminorex)	4-Methyl-5-phenyl-4,5-dihydro-1,3-oxazol-2-ylazan
	4-Methylbuphedrone (4-MeMABP)	2-(Methylamino)-1-(4-methylphenyl)butan-1-on
Methyldesorphine		4,5a-Epoxy-6,17-dimethyl-morphin-6-en-3-ol
Methyldihydromorphine		4,5a-Epoxy-6,17-dimethyl-morphinan-3,6a-diol
	Methylenedioxyethylamphetamine (N-Ethyl-MDA, MDE, MDEA)	[1-(1,3-Benzodioxol-5-yl)propan-2-yl](ethyl)azan
	Methylenedioxymethamphetamine (MDMA)	[1-(1,3-Benzodioxol-5-yl)propan-2-yl](methyl)azan
	α-Methylfentanyl	N-Phenyl-N-[1-(1-phenylpropan-2-yl)-4-piperidyl]propanamid
	3-Methylfentanyl (Mefentanyl)	N-(3-Methyl-1-phenethyl-4-piperidyl)-N-phenylpropanamid
	Methylmethaqualone	3-(2,4-Dimethylphenyl)-2-methyl-chinazolin-4(3H)on
	3-Methylmethcathinone (3-MMC)	2-(Methylamino)-1-(3-methylphenyl)propan-1-on
	4-Methylmethcathinone (Mephedrone)	1-(4-Methylphenyl)-2-methylaminopropan-1-on
	Desmethylprodine (MPPP)	(1-Methyl-4-phenyl-4-piperidyl)propionat
	Methyl-3-phenylpropylamine (1M-3PP)	(Methyl)(3-phenylpropyl)azan
	Methylphenyltetrahydropyridine (MPTP)	1-Methyl-4-phenyl-1,2,3,6-tetrahydropyridin
	Methylpiperidylbenzilate	(1-Methyl-3-piperidyl)benzilat
	4-Methylthioamphetamine (4-MTA)	1-[4-(Methylsulfanyl)phenyl]propan-2-ylazan
	α-Methylthiofentanyl	N-Phenyl-N-{1-[1-(2-thienyl)propan-2-yl]-4-piperidyl}propanamid
	3-Methylthiofentanyl	N-{3-Methyl-1-[2-(2-thienyl)ethyl]-4-piperidyl}-N-phenyl-propanamid
	α-Methyltryptamine (α-MT, AMT)	N-{3-Methyl-1-[2-(2-thienyl)ethyl]-4-piperidyl}-N-phenyl-propanamid
Metopon	5-Methyldihydromorphinone	4,5a-Epoxy-3-hydroxy-5,17-dimethylmorphinan-6-on
Morpheridine		Ethyl(1-(2-morpholinoethyl)-4-phenylpiperidin-4-carboxylat)
	Morphine-N-oxide	(5R,6S)-4,5-Epoxy-3,6-dihydroxy-17-methylmorphin-7-en-17-oxid
Myrophine	Myristylbenzylmorphine	(3-Benzyloxy-4,5a-epoxy-17-methylmorphin-7-en-6-yl)tetradecanoat
Nicomorphine	3, 6-Dinicotinoylmorphine	4,5a-Epoxy-17-methyl-morphin-7-en-3,6a-diyl)dinicotinat
Noracymethadol		(6-Methylamino-4,4-diphenyl-heptan-3-yl)acetat
Norcodeine	N-Desmethylcodeine	4,5a-Epoxy-3-methoxy-morphin-7-en-6a-ol
Norlevorphanol	(-)3-Hydroxymorphinane	(9R,13R,14R)-Morphinan-3-ol
Normorphine	Desmethylmorphine	4,5a-Epoxymorphin-7-en-3,6a-diol
Norpipanone		4,4-Diphenyl-6-piperidinohexan-3-on
	Parahexyl	3-Hexyl-6, 6, 9-trimethyl-7, 8, 9, 10-tetrahydro-6H-benzo[c]chromen-1-ol
	PCPr	(1-Phenylcyclohexyl)(propyl)azan
	Pentylone (βk-MBDP)	1-(1,3-Benzodioxol-5-yl)-2-(methylamino)pentan-1-on
Phenadoxone		6-Morpholino-4,4-diphenyl-heptan-3-on
Phenampromide		N-Phenyl-N-(1-piperidinopropan-2-yl)propanamid
Phenazocine		6,11-Dimethyl-3-phenethyl-1,2,3,4,5,6-hexahydro-2,6-methano-3-benzazocin-8-ol
Phencyclidine	PCP	1-(1-Phenylcyclohexyl)piperidin
	Phenethylphenylacetoxypipederidine (PEPAP)	(1-Phenethyl-4-phenyl-4-piperidyl)acetat
	Phenethylphenyltetrahydropyridine (PEPTP)	1-Phenethyl-4-phenyl-1,2,3,6-tetrahydropyridin
Phenpromethamine	1-Methylamino-2-phenyl-propan (PPMA)	(Methyl)(2-phenylpropyl)azan
Phenomorphan		17-Phenethylmorphinan-3-ol
Phenoperidine		Ethyl [1-(3-hydroxy-3-phenyl-propyl)-4-phenylpiperidin-4-carboxylat]
Piminodine		Ethyl[1-(3-anilinopropyl)-4-phenylpiperidin-4-carboxylat]
	α-Pyrrolidinopentiophenone (α-PPP)	1-Phenyl-2-(pyrrolidin-1-yl)propan-1-one
Proheptazine		(1,3-Dimethyl-4-phenylazepan-4-yl)propionat
Properidine		Isopropyl(1-methyl-4-phenyl-piperidin-4-carboxylat)
	Psilocin (Psilotsin)	3-(2-Dimethylaminoethyl)indol-4-ol
	4-HO-DET	3-(2-Diethylaminoethyl)indol-4-ol
Psilocybin		[3-(2-Dimethylaminoethyl)indol-4-yl]dihydrogenphosphat
	Ethocybin	[3-(2-Diethylaminoethyl)indol-4-yl]dihydrogenphosphate
	4'-Methyl-α-pyrrolidinopropiophenone (4-MePPP)	2-(Pyrrolidin-1-yl)-1-(p-tolyl)propan-1-one
Racemethorphan		(9RS,13RS,14RS)-3-Methoxy-17-methylmorphinan
Rolicyclidine	PHP (PCPy)	1-(1-Phenylcyclohexyl)pyrrolidin
	Salvia divinorum	
Tenamphetamine	Methylenedioxyamphetamine (MDA)	(RS)-1-(1,3-Benzodioxol-5-yl)propan-2-ylazan
Tenocyclidine	TCP	1-[1-(2-Thienyl)cyclohexyl]piperidin
	Tetrahydrocannabinols, the following isomers and their stereochemical variants:	
	Δ6a(10a)-Tetrahydrocannabinol (Δ6a(10a)-THC)	6,6,9-Trimethyl-3-pentyl-7,8,9,10-tetrahydro-6H-benzo[c]chromen-1-ol
	Δ6a-Tetrahydrocannabinol (Δ6a-THC)	(9R,10aR)-6,6,9-Trimethyl-3-pentyl-8,9,10,10a-tetra-hydro-6H-benzo[c]chromen-1- ol(6aR,9R,10aR)-6,6,9-Trimethyl-3-pentyl-6a,9,10,10a-tetrahydro-6H-benzo[c] chromen-1-ol
	Δ7-Tetrahydrocannabinol (Δ7-THC)	
	Δ8-Tetrahydrocannabinol (Δ8-THC)	(6aR,10aR)-6,6,9-Trimethyl-3-pentyl-6a,7,10,10a-tetra-hydro-6H-benzo[c]chromen- 1-ol(6aR)-6,6,9-Trimethyl-3-pentyl-6a,7,8,9-tetrahydro-6H-benzo[c]chromen-1-ol
	Δ10-Tetrahydrocannabinol (Δ10-THC)	
	Δ9(11)-Tetrahydrocannabinol (Δ9(11)-THC)	(6aR,10aR)-6,6-Dimethyl-9-methylen-3-pentyl-6a,7,8,9,10,10a-hexahydro-6H-benzo[c] chromen-1-ol
	Thienyl fentanyl	N-Phenyl-N-(1-thenyl-4-piperidyl)propanamid
	Thienoamphetamine (Thiopropamine)	1-(Thiophen-2-yl)propan-2-amin
	Thiofentanyl	N-Phenyl-N-{1-[2-(2-thienyl)ethyl]-4-piperidyl}propanamid
Trimeperidine		(1,2,5-Trimethyl-4-phenyl-4-piperidyl)propionat
	3,4,5-Trimethoxyamphetamine (TMA)	1-(3,4,5-Trimethoxyphenyl)propan-2-ylazan
	2,4,5-Trimethoxyamphetamine (TMA-2)	1-(2,4,5-Trimethoxyphenyl)propan-2-ylazan

As well as ester, ether, stereoisomers and salts of the substances listed in Anlage I.

== Anlage II ==
Anlage II controlled substances are tradable, given special permission of the authorities, however not prescribable. Narcotics on Anlage II are usually needed for the production of other narcotics on Anlage III.

INN	Trivial name	German IUPAC
	AB-CHMINACA	N-(1-Amino-3-methyl-1-oxobutan-2-yl)-1-(cyclohexylmethyl)-1H-indazol-3-carboxamid
	AB-FUBINACA	N-(1-Amino-3-methyl-1-oxobutan-2-yl)-1-[(4-fluorphenyl)methyl]-1H-indazol-3-carboxamid
	AB-PINACA	N-(1-Amino-3-methyl-1-oxobutan-2-yl)-1-pentyl-1H-indazol-3-carboxamid
	AB-001	(Adamantan-1-yl)(1-pentyl-1H-indol-3-yl)methanone
	Acetylfentanyl (Desmethylfentanyl)	N-Phenyl-N-[1-(2-phenylethyl)piperidin-4-yl]acetamid
	Acryloylfentanyl (Acrylfentanyl, ACF)	N-Phenyl-N-[1-(2-phenylethyl)piperidin-4-yl]prop-3-enamid
	5F-ADB (5F-MDMB-PINACA)	Methyl{2-[1-(5-fluorpentyl)-1H-indazol-3-carboxamid]-3,3-dimethylbutanoat}
	ADB-BINACA (ADB-BUTINACA, ADMB-BINACA)	N-(1-Amino-3,3-dimethyl-1-oxobutan-2-yl)-1-butyl-1H-indazol-3-carboxamid
	ADB-CHMINACA (MAB-CHMINACA)	N-(1-Amino-3,3-dimethyl-1-oxobutan-2-yl)-1-(cyclohexylmethyl)-1H-indazol-3-carboxamid
	ADB-FUBINACA	N-(1-Amino-3,3-dimethyl-1-oxobutan-2-yl)-1-[(4-fluorphenyl)methyl]-1H-indazol-3-carboxamid
	AH-7921 (Doxylam)	3,4-Dichlor-N-{[1-(dimethylamino)cyclohexyl]methyl}benzamid
	AKB-48 (APINACA)	N-(Adamantan-1-yl)-1-pentyl-1H-indazol-3-carboxamid
	5F-AKB-48 (5F-APINACA)	N-(Adamantan-1-yl)-1-(5-fluorpentyl)-1H-indazol-3-carboxamid
	AM-694	[1-(5-Fluorpentyl)-1H-indol-3-yl](2-iodphenyl)methanon
	AM-1220	{1-[(1-Methylpiperidin-2-yl)methyl]-1H-indol-3-yl}(naphthalin-1-yl)methanon
	AM-1220-Azepane	[1-(1-Methylazepan-3-yl)-1H-indol-3-yl](naphthalin-1-yl)methanon
	AM-2201	[1-(5-Fluorpentyl)-1H-indol-3-yl] (naphthalin-1-yl)methanon
	AM-2232	5-[3-(Naphthalin-1-carbonyl)-1H-indol-1-yl]pentannitril
	AM-2233	(2-Iodphenyl){1-[(1-methylpiperidin-2-yl)methyl]-1H-indol-3-yl}methanon
	AMB-CHMICA (MMB-CHMICA)	Methyl{2-[1-(cyclohexylmethyl)-1H-indol-3-carboxamido]-3-methylbutanoat}
	AMB-FUBINACA (FUB-AMB)	Methyl(2-{1-[(4-fluorphenyl)methyl]-1H-indazol-3-carboxamid}-3-methylbutanoat)
Amphetaminil		(Phenyl)[(1-phenylpropan-2-yl)amino]acetonitril
Amineptine		7-(10,11-Dihydro-5H-dibenzo[a,d] [7]annulen-5-ylamino)heptansäure
Aminorex		5-Phenyl-4,5-dihydro-1,3-oxazol-2-ylazan
	5-APB	1-(Benzofuran-5-yl)propan-2-amin
	6-APB	1-(Benzofuran-6-yl)propan-2-amin
	APICA (SDB-001, 2NE1)	N-(Adamantan-1-yl)-1-pentyl-1H-indol-3-carboxamid
	alpha-Pyrrolidinohexiophenone (Alpha-PHP, α-PHP, PV-7)	1-Phenyl-2-(pyrrolidin-1-yl)hexan-1-on
	α-Pyrrolidinoisohexanophenone (Alpha-PiHP, α-PiHP, 4-Methyl-α-PVP)	4-Methyl-1-phenyl-2-(pyrrolidin-1-yl)pentan-1-on
	Alpha-PVT (α-PVT, alpha-Pyrrolidinopentiothiophenon)	2-(Pyrrolidin-1-yl)-1-(thiophen-2-yl)pentan-1-on
	BB-22 (QUCHIC)	Chinolin-8-yl[1-(cyclohexylmethyl)-1H-indol-3-carboxylat]
	Benzylpiperazine (BZP)	1-Benzylpiperazin
	Brorphine	1-{1-[1-(4-Bromphenyl)ethyl]piperidin-4-yl}-1,3-dihydro-2H-benzimidazol-2-on
	Buphedrone	2-(Methylamino)-1-phenylbutan-1-on
Butalbital		5-Allyl-5-isobutylbarbitursäure
	Butobarbital	5-Butyl-5-ethylpyrimidin-2,4,6(1H,3H,5H)-trion
	Butylone	1-(Benzo[d] [1,3]dioxol-5-yl)-2-(methylamino)butan-1-on
	Butyrfentanyl (Butyrylfentanyl)	N-Phenyl-N-[1-(2-phenylethyl)piperidin-4-yl]butanamid
Cetobemidone	Ketobemidone	1-[4-(3-Hydroxyphenyl)-1-methyl-4-piperidyl]propan-1-on
	3-Chloromethcathinone (3-CMC, Clophedrone)	1-(3-Chlorphenyl)-2-methylaminopropan-1-on
	meta-Chlorophenylpiperazine (m-CPP)	1-(3-Chlorphenyl)piperazin
	D-Cocaine	Methyl(3β-(benzoyloxy)tropan-2alpha-carboxylat)
	CP 47,497	5-(1,1-Dimethylheptyl)-2-[(1RS,3SR)-3-hydroxycyclohexyl]-phenol
	CP 47,497-C6-Homolog	5-(1,1-Dimethylhexyl)-2-[(1RS,3SR)-3-hydroxycyclohexyl]-phenol
	5Cl-AKB-48 (5C-AKB-48, AKB-48Cl, 5Cl-APINACA, 5C-APINACA)	N-(Adamantan-1-yl)-1-(5-chlorpentyl)-1H-indazol-3-carboxamid
	5Cl-JWH-018 (JWH-018 N-(5-Chlorpentyl)-Analogue)	[1-(5-Chlorpentyl)-1H-indol-3-yl](naphthalin-1-yl)methanon
	Clonazolam (Clonitrazolam)	6-(2-Chlorphenyl)-1-methyl-8-nitro-4H-[1,2,4]triazolo[4,3-a][1,4]benzodiazepin
	CP 47,497-C8-Homolog	5-(1,1-Dimethyloctyl)-2-[(1RS,3SR)-3-hydroxycyclohexyl]-phenol
	CP 47,497-C9	5-(1,1-Dimethylnonyl)-2-[(1RS,3SR)-3-hydroxycyclohexyl]-phenol
	Crotonylfentanyl	(2E)-N-Phenyl-N-[1-(2-phenylethyl)piperidin-4-yl]but-2-enamid
	CUMYL-4CN-BINACA (SGT-78)	1-(4-Cyanobutyl)-N-(2-phenylpropan-2-yl)-1H-indazol-3-carboxamid
	CUMYL-5F-PEGACLONE (5F-Cumyl-PeGaClone, 5F-SGT-151)	5-(5-Fluorpentyl)-2-(2-phenylpropan-2-yl)-2,5-dihydro-1H-pyrido[4,3-b]indol-1-on
	CUMYL-PEGACLONE (SGT-151)	5-Pentyl-2-(2-phenylpropan-2-yl)-2,5-dihydro-1H-pyrido[4,3-b]indol-1-on
	CUMYL-5F-P7AICA (5-Fluoro-CUMYL-P7AICA, SGT-263)	1-(5-Fluorpentyl)-N-(2-phenylpropan-2-yl)-1H-pyrrolo[2,3-b]pyridin-3-carboxamid
Cyclobarbital		5-(Cyclohex-1-en-1-yl)-5-ethylpyrimidin-2,4,6(1H,3H,5H)-trion
	Cyclopropylfentanyl	N-Phenyl-N-[1-(2-phenylethyl)piperidin-4-yl]cyclopropancarboxamid
	Desoxypipradrol (2-DPMP)	2-(Diphenylmethyl)piperidin
	Dextromethadone	(S)-6-Dimethylamino-4,4-diphenylheptan-3-on
Dextromoramide		(S)-3-Methyl-4-morpholino-2,2-diphenyl-1-(pyrrolidin-1-yl)butan-1-on
Dextropropoxyphene		[(2S,3R)-4-Dimethylamino-3-methyl-1,2-diphenylbutan-2-yl]propionat
	Diamorphine, only for the production of preparations for medical purposes	[(5R,6S)-4,5-Epoxy-17-methylmorphin-7-en-3,6-diyl]diacetat
	Diclazepam (2'-Chlorodiazepam)	7-Chlor-5-(2-chlorphenyl)-1-methyl-1,3-dihydro-2H-1,4-benzodiazepin-2-on
Difenoxin	(in doses higher than zu 0.5 mg base or with less than 5% atropine sulphate)	1-(3-Cyan-3,3-diphenylpropyl)-4-phenylpiperidin-4-carbonsäure
	Dihydromorphine	4,5a-Epoxy-17-methylmorphinan-3,6a-diol
	Dihydrothebaine	4,5a-Epoxy-3,6-dimethoxy-17-methylmorphin-6-en
	Dimethocaine (DMC, Larocaine)	(3-Diethylamino-2,2-dimethylpropyl)-4-aminobenzoat
	Diphenidine (1,2-DEP, DPD, DND, 1,2-Diphenylethylpiperidine)	1-(1,2-Diphenylethyl)piperidin
	2,5-Dimethoxy-4-iodoamphetamine (DOI)	1-(4-Iod-2,5-dimethoxyphenyl)propan-2-amin
	3,4-Dimethylmethcathinone (3,4-DMMC)	1-(3,4-Dimethylphenyl)-2-(methylamino)propan-1-on
Diphenoxylate	(in doses higher than 2.5 mg base or with less than 1% atropine sulphate)	Ethyl[1-(3-cyan-3,3-diphenylpropyl)-4-phenylpiperidin-4-carboxylat]
	4,4'-DMAR (para-Methyl-4-methylaminorex)	4-Methyl-5-(4-methylphenyl)-4,5-dihydro-1,3-oxazol-2-amin
	EAM-2201 (5-fluoro-JWH-210)	(4-Ethylnaphthalin-1-yl)[1-(5-fluorpentyl)-1H-indol-3-yl]methanon
	Ecgonine	3β-Hydroxytropan-2β-carbonsäure
	Erythroxylum coca	
	Etazene (Etodesnitazene)	N,N-Diethyl-2-{2-[(4-ethoxyphenyl)methyl]-1H-benzimidazol-1-yl}ethan-1-amin
	Ethcathinone	(RS)-2-(Ethylamino)-1-phenylpropan-1-on
Ethchlorvynol		1-Chlor-3-ethylpent-1-en-4-in-3-ol
Ethinamate		(1-Ethinylcyclohexyl)carbamat
	3-O-Ethylmorphine (Ethylmorphine) (in doses higher than 100 mg base)	4,5a-Epoxy-3-ethoxy-17-methylmorphin-7-en-6a-ol
	Ethylphenidate	Ethyl[2-(phenyl)-2-(piperidin-2-yl) acetat]
Etilamfetamine	N-Ethylamphetamine	(Ethyl)(1-phenylpropan-2-yl)azan
	Etonitazepyne (N-Pyrrolidino Etonitazene)	2-[(4-Ethoxyphenyl)methyl]-5-nitro-1-(2-pyrrolidin-1-ylethyl)-1H-benzimidazol
	Eutylone (N-Ethylnorbutylone, bk-EBDB)	1-(1,3-Benzodioxol-5-yl)-2-(ethylamino)butan-1-on
	4F-MDMB-BICA (4F-MDMB-BUTICA, 4FBC, 4FBCA, MDMB-073-F, 4F-MDMB-2201)	Methyl{2-[1-(4-fluorbutyl)-1H-indol-3-carboxamido]-3,3-dimethylbutanoat}
	4F-MDMB-BINACA (4F-MDMB-BUTINACA, 4F-ADB)	Methyl{2-[1-(4-fluorbutyl)-1H-indazol-3-carboxamido]-3,3-dimethylbutanoat}
	5F-ABICA (5F-AMBICA, 5-fluoro-ABICA, 5-fluoro-AMBICA)	N-(1-Amino-3-methyl-1-oxobutan-2-yl)-1-(5-fluorpentyl)-1H-indol-3-carboxamid
	5F-AB-PINACA (5-fluoro-AB-PINACA)	N-(1-Amino-3-methyl-1-oxobutan-2-yl)-1-(5-fluorpentyl)-1H-indazol-3-carboxamid
	5F-AMB (5-fluoro-AMB)	Methyl{2-[1-(5-fluorpentyl)-1H-indazol-3-carboxamido]-3-methylbutanoat}
	FDU-PB-22	Naphthalin-1-yl{1[(4-fluorphenyl)methyl]-1H-indol-3-carboxylat}
Fencamfamine		N-Ethyl-3-phenylbicyclo[2.2.1]heptan-2-amin
	Flephedrone (4-Fluoromethcathinone, 4-FMC)	1-(4-Fluorphenyl)-2-(methylamino)propan-1-on
	Flualprazolam (2-Fluoro-Alprazolam, SCHEMBL7327360, Flu-Alp)	8-Chlor-6-(2-fluorphenyl)-1-methyl-4H-[1,2,4]triazolo[4,3-a] [1,4]benzodiazepin
	Flubromazepam	7-Brom-5-(2-fluorphenyl)-1,3-dihydro-2H-1,4-benzodiazepin-2-on
	Flubromazolam	8-Brom-6-(2-fluorphenyl)-1-methyl-4H-[1,2,4]triazolo[4,3-a][1,4]benzodiazepin
	4-Fluoroisobutyrfentanyl (4-Fluorisobutyrylfentanyl, 4F-iBF, p-FIBF)	N-(4-Fluorphenyl)-2-methyl-N-[1-(2-phenylethyl)piperidin-4-yl]propanamid
	4-Fluoromethamphetamine (4-FMA)	1-(4-Fluorphenyl)-N-methylpropan-2-amin
	3-Fluoromethcathinone (3-FMC)	1-(3-Fluorphenyl)-2-(methylamino)propan-1-on
	Furanylfentanyl (FU-F)	N-Phenyl-N-[1-(2-phenylethyl)piperidin-4-yl]furan-2-carboxamid
	5F-JWH-122 (MAM-2201)	[1-(5-Fluorpentyl)-1H-indol-3-yl] (4-methylnaphthalin-1-yl)methanon
	p-Fluorophenylpiperazine (p-FPP)	1-(4-Fluorphenyl)piperazin
	4-Fluorotropacocaine	3-(4-Fluorbenzoyloxy)tropan
	5-Fluoro-UR-144 (XLR-11)	[1-(5-Fluorpentyl)-1H-indol-3-yl] (2,2,3,3-tetramethylcyclopropyl) methanon
	5F-PB-22 (5F-QUPIC)	Chinolin-8-yl[1-(5-fluorpentyl)indol-3-carboxylat]
	5F-SDB-006	N-Benzyl-1-(5-fluorpentyl)-1H-indol-3-carboxamid
	FUB-PB-22	Chinolin-8-yl{1-[(4-fluorphenyl)methyl]-1H-indol-3-carboxylat}
Glutethimide		3-Ethyl-3-phenylpiperidin-2,6-dion
	Isocodeine	4,5a-Epoxy-3-methoxy-17-methylmorphin-7-en-6β-ol
Isomethadone		6-Dimethylamino-5-methyl-4,4-diphenylhexan-3-on
	Isotonitazene	N,N-Diethyl-2-{[4-(1-methylethoxy)phenyl]methyl}-5-nitro-1H-benzimidazol-1-ethanamin
	JWH-007	(2-Methyl-1-pentyl-1H-indol-3-yl)(naphthalin-1-yl)methanon
	JWH-015	(2-Methyl-1-propyl-1H-indol-3-yl)(naphthalin-1-yl)methanon
	JWH-018	(Naphthalin-1-yl)(1-pentyl-1H-indol-3-yl)methanon
	JWH-019	(Naphthalin-1-yl)(1-hexyl-1H-indol-3-yl)methanon
	JWH-073	(Naphthalin-1-yl)(1-butyl-1H-indol-3-yl)methanon
	JWH-081	(4-Methoxynaphthalin-1-yl)(1-pentyl-1H-indol-3-yl)methanon
	JWH-122	(4-Methylnaphthalin-1-yl)(1-pentyl-1H-indol-3-yl)methanon
	JWH-200	[1-(2-Morpholinoethyl)-1H-indol-3-yl](naphthalin-1-yl)methanon
	JWH-203	2-(2-Chlorphenyl)-1-(1-pentyl-1H-indol-3-yl)ethanon
	JWH-210	(4-Ethylnaphthalin-1-yl)(1-pentyl-1H-indol-3-yl)methanon
	JWH-250	2-(2-Methoxyphenyl)-1-(1-pentyl-1H-indol-3-yl)ethanon
	JWH-251	2-(2-Methylphenyl)-1-(1-pentyl-1H-indol-3-yl)ethanon
	JWH-307	[5-(2-Fluorphenyl)-1-pentyl-1H-pyrrol-3-yl](naphthalin-1-yl) methanon
Levoamphetamine	Levamfetamine	(R)-1-Phenylpropan-2-ylazan
	Levomethamphetamine (Levometamfetamine)	(R)-(Methyl)(1-phenylpropan-2-yl)azan
Levomoramide		(R)-3-Methyl-4-morpholino-2,2-diphenyl-1-(pyrrolidin-1-yl)butan-1-on
Levorphanol		(9R,13R,14R)-17-Methylmorphinan-3-ol
Mazindol		5-(4-Chlorphenyl)-2,5-dihydro-3H-imidazol[2,1-a]isoindol-5-ol
	5F-MDMB-PICA (5F-MDMB-2201)	Methyl{2-[1-(5-fluorpentyl)-1H-indol-3-carboxamido]-3,3-dimethylbutanoat}
	MDMB-4en-PINACA	Methyl{2-[1-(pent-4-en-1-yl)-1H-indazol-3-carboxamido]-3,3-dimethylbutanoat}
	MDMB-CHMCZCA (EGMB-CHMINACA)	Methyl{2-[9-(cyclohexylmethyl)-9H-carbazol-3-carboxamido]-3,3-dimethylbutanoat}
	MDMB-CHMICA	Methyl{2-[1-(cyclohexylmethyl)-1H-indol-3-carboxamido]-3,3-dimethylbutanoat}
Mefenorex		3-Chlor-N-(1-phenylpropan-2-yl)propan-1-amin
Meprobamate		(2-Methyl-2-propylpropan-1,3-diyl)dicarbamat
	3-Methoxyphencyclidine (3-MeO-PCP)	1-[1-(3-Methoxyphenyl)cyclohexyl]piperidin
Mesocarb		(Phenylcarbamoyl)[3-(1-phenylpropan-2-yl)-1,2,3-oxadiazol-3-ium-5-yl]azanid
Methamphetamine		(2S)-N-Methyl-1-phenylpropan-2-amin
(RS)-Methamphetamine		(RS)-(Methyl)(1-phenylpropan-2-yl)azan
	Methadone intermediate (Premethadone)	4-Dimethylamino-2,2-diphenylpentannitril
Methaqualone		2-Methyl-3-(2-methylphenyl)chinazolin-4(3H)-on
	Methedrone (4-Methoxymethcathinone, PMMC)	1-(4-Methoxyphenyl)-2-(methylamino)propan-1-on
	Methoxyacetylfentanyl	2-Methoxy-N-phenyl-N-[1-(2-phenylethyl)piperidin-4-yl]acetamid
	p-Methoxyethylamphetamine (PMEA)	N-Ethyl-1-(4-methoxyphenyl)propan-2-amin
	4-Methylamphetamine	1-(4-Methylphenyl)propan-2-amin
	2-Methyl-AP-237	1-[2-Methyl-4-(3-phenylprop-2-en-1-yl)piperazin-1-yl]butan-1-on
	Methylbenzylpiperazine (MBZP)	1-Benzyl-4-methylpiperazin
	3,4-Methylenedioxypyrovalerone (MDPV)	1-(Benzo[d] [1,3]dioxol-5-yl)-2-(pyrrolidin-1-yl)pentan-1-on
	4-Methylethcathinone (4-MEC)	2-(Ethylamino)-1-(4-methylphenyl)propan-1-on
	Methylone (3,4-Methylenedioxy-N-methcathinone, MDMC)	1-(Benzo[d] [1,3]dioxol-5-yl)-2-(methylamino)propan-1-on
(RS;SR)-Methylphenidate		Methyl[(RS;SR)(phenyl)(2-piperidyl)acetat]
Methyprylon		3,3-Diethyl-5-methylpiperidin-2,4-dion
	Metonitazene	N,N-Diethyl-2-{2-[(4-methoxyphenyl)methyl]-5-nitro-1H-benzimidazol-1-yl}ethan-1-amin
	Poppy straw concentrate	
	MMB-2201 (5F-AMB-PICA, 5F-MMB-PICA)	Methyl{2-[1-(5-fluorpentyl)-1H-indol-3-carboxamido]-3-methylbutanoat}
	5F-MN-18 (AM-2201 Indazolecarboxamide-Analog)	1-(5-Fluorpentyl)-N-1-(naphthalin-1-yl)-1H-indazol-3-carboxamid
	Moramide intermediate (Premoramide)	3-Methyl-4-morpholino-2,2-diphenylbutansäure
	MT-45	1-Cyclohexyl-4-(1,2-diphenylethyl)piperazin
	Naphyrone (Naphthylpyrovalerone)	1-(Naphthalin-2-yl)-2-(pyrrolidin-1-yl)pentan-1-on
	NE-CHMIMO (JWH-018 N-(Cyclohexylmethyl)-Analogue)	[1-(Cyclohexylmethyl)-1H-indol-3-yl](naphthalin-1-yl)methanon
	N-Ethylhexedrone (Ethyl-Hexedrone, HexEn, Ethyl-Hex, NEH)	2-(Ethylamino)-1-phenylhexan-1-on
	N-Ethylpentylone (Ephylone, βk-EBDP, βk-Ethyl-K)	1-(1,3-Benzodioxol-5-yl)-2-(ethylamino)pentan-1-on
Nicocodeine	6-Nicotinoylcodein	(4,5a-Epoxy-3-methoxy-17-methylmorphin-7-en-6a-yl)nicotinat
Nicodicodine	6-Nicotinoyldihydrocodein	(4,5a-Epoxy-3-methoxy-17-methylmorphinan-6a-yl)nicotinat
	NM-2201 (CBL-2201)	Naphthalin-1-yl[1-(5-fluorpentyl)-1H-indol-3-carboxylat]
	Ocfentanil (A-3217)	N-(2-Fluorphenyl)-2-methoxy-N-[1-(2-phenylethyl)piperidin-4-yl]acetamid
	Oripavine	4,5a-Epoxy-6-methoxy-17-methylmorphina-6,8-dien-3-ol
	Orthofluorofentanyl (2-Fluorofentanyl, 2F-F, 2-FF, o-FF)	N-(2-Fluorphenyl)-N-[1-(2-phenylethyl)piperidin-4-yl]propanamid
Oxymorphone	14-Hydroxydihydromorphinone	4,5a-Epoxy-3,14-dihydroxy-17-methylmorphinan-6-on
	Papaver bracteatum	
	Parafluorobutyrylfentanyl (Parafluorobutyrfentanyl, 4-Fluorobutyrfentanyl, 4F-BF, PFBF)	N-(4-Fluorphenyl)-N-[1-(2-phenylethyl)piperidin-4-yl]butanamid
	PB-22 (QUPIC)	Chinolin-8-yl(1-pentylindol-3-carboxylat)
	Pentedrone	2-(Methylamino)-1-phenylpentan-1-on
	Pethidine intermediate A (Prepethidine)	1-Methyl-4-phenylpiperidin-4-carbonitril
	Pethidine intermediate B (Norpethidine)	Ethyl(4-phenylpiperidin-4-carboxylat)
	Pethidine intermediate C (Pethidinic acid)	1-Methyl-4-phenylpiperidin-4-carbonsäure
Phendimetrazine		(2S,3S)-3,4-Dimethyl-2-phenylmorpholin
Phenmetrazine		3-Methyl-2-phenylmorpholin
Pholcodine	Morpholinylethylmorphine (in doses higher than 20 mg base)	4,5a-Epoxy-17-methyl-3-(2-morpholinoethoxy)morphin-7-en-6a-ol
Propiram		N-(1-Piperidinopropan-2-yl)-N-(2-pyridyl)propanamid
	Protonitazene	N,N-Diethyl-2-{2-[(4-propoxyphenyl)methyl]-5-nitro-1H-benzimidazol-1-yl}ethan-1-amin
Pyrovalerone		2-(Pyrrolidin-1-yl)-1-(p-tolyl)pentan-1-on
	α-Pyrrolidinopentiophenone (α-PVP)	1-Phenyl-2-(pyrrolidin-1-yl)pentan-1-on
Racemoramide		(RS)-3-Methyl-4-morpholino-2,2-diphenyl-1-(pyrrolidin-1-yl)butan-1-on
Racemorphan		(9RS,13RS,14RS)-17-Methylmorphinan-3-ol
	RCS-4	(4-Methoxyphenyl)(1-pentyl-1H-indol-3-yl)methanon
	RCS-4 ortho-Isomer (o-RCS-4)	(2-Methoxyphenyl)(1-pentyl-1H-indol-3-yl)methanon
	SDB-006	N-Benzyl-1-pentyl-1H-indol-3-carboxamid
Secbutabarbital	Butabarbital	5-(Butan-2-yl)-5-ethylpyrimidin-2,4,6(1H,3H,5H)-trion
	STS-135 (5F-2NE1)	N-(Adamantan-1-yl)-1-(5-fluorpentyl)-1H-indol-3-carboxamid
	Δ9-Tetrahydrocannabinol (Δ9-THC)	6,6,9-Trimethyl-3-pentyl-6a,7,8,10a-tetrahydro-6H-benzo[c]chromen-1-ol
	Tetrahydrofuranylfentanyl (THF-F)	N-Phenyl-N-[1-(2-phenylethyl)piperidin-4-yl]tetrahydrofuran-2-carboxamid
	Tetrahydrothebaine	4,5a-Epoxy-3,6-dimethoxy-17-methylmorphinan
Thebacon	Acetyldihydrocodeinone	(4,5a-Epoxy-3-methoxy-17-methylmorphin-6-en-6-yl)acetat
	Thebaine	4,5a-Epoxy-3,6-dimethoxy-17-methylmorphina-6,8-dien
	THJ-018 (JWH-018 Indazole-Analog)	(Naphthalin-1-yl)(1-pentyl-1H-indazol-3-yl)methanon
	THJ-2201 (AM-2201 Indazole-Analog)	[1-(5-Fluorpentyl)-1H-indazol-3-yl] (naphthalin-1-yl)methanon
cis-Tilidine		Ethyl[(1RS,2RS)-2-dimethylamino-1-phenylcyclohex-3-encarboxylat]
	3-Trifluoromethylphenylpiperazine (TFMPP)	1-[3-(Trifluormethyl)phenyl]piperazin
	U-47700	3,4-Dichlor-N-[2-(dimethylamino)cyclohexyl]-N-methylbenzamid
	U-48800	2-(2,4-Dichlorphenyl)-N-[2-(dimethylamino)cyclohexyl]-N-methylacetamid
	UR-144	(1-Pentyl-1H-indol-3-yl)(2,2,3,3-tetramethylcyclopropyl)methanon
	Valerylfentanyl	N-Phenyl-N-[1-(2-phenylethyl) piperidin-4-yl]pentanamid
Vinylbital		5-Ethenyl-5-(pentan-2-yl)pyrimidin-2,4,6(1H,3H,5H)-trion
Zipeprol		1-Methoxy-3-[4-(2-methoxy-2-phenylethyl)piperazin-1-yl]-1-phenylpropan-2-ol

As well as ester, ether and salts of the substances listed in Anlage II.

== Anlage III ==
Anlage III controlled substances are tradable and prescribable, but only on a special prescription form. The prescription must be necessary in that its purpose cannot be met by other means. Summary of Product Characteristics for these substances are restricted to professional circles.

INN	Trivial name	German IUPAC
Alfentanil		N-{1-[2-(4-Ethyl-5-oxo-4,5-dihydro-1H-tetrazol-1-yl)ethyl]-4-methoxymethyl-4-piperidyl}-N-phenylpropanamid
Allobarbital		5,5-Diallylbarbitursäure
Alprazolam	(in doses higher than 1 mg)	8-Chlor-1-methyl-6-phenyl-4H-[1,2,4]triazolo[4,3-a] [1,4]benzodiazepin
Amfepramone	(in doses higher than 22 mg base or sustained release doses higher than 64 mg base)	2-Diethylamino-1-phenylpropan-1-on
Amfetamine	Amphetamine	(RS)-1-Phenylpropan-2-ylazan
Amobarbital		5-Ethyl-5-isopentylbarbitursäure
Barbital		5,5-Diethylbarbitursäure
Bromazepam	(in doses higher than 6 mg)	7-Brom-5-(2-pyridyl)-1,3-dihydro-2H-1,4-benzodiazepin-2-on
Brotizolam	(in doses higher than 0.25 mg)	2-Brom-4-(2-chlorphenyl)-9-methyl-6H-thieno[3,2-f] [1,2,4]triazolo[4,3-a] [1,4]diazepin
Buprenorphine		(5R,6R,7R,14S)-17-Cyclopropyl-methyl-4,5-epoxy-7-[(S)-2-hydroxy-3,3-dimethylbutan-2-yl]-6-methoxy-6,14-ethanomorphinan-3-ol
Camazepam		(7-Chlor-1-methyl-2-oxo-5-phenyl-2,3-dihydro-1H-1,4-enzodiazepin-3-yl)(dimethylcarbamat)
	Medicinal cannabis from state-controlled production	
Cathine	(in doses higher than 40 mg base)	(1S,2S)-2-Amino-1-phenylpropan-1-ol
Chlordiazepoxide	(in doses higher than 25 mg)	7-Chlor-2-methylamino-5-phenyl-3H-1,4-benzodiazepin-4-oxid
Clobazam	(in doses higher than 30 mg)	7-Chlor-1-methyl-5-phenyl-1,3-dihydro-2H-1,5-benzodiazepin-2,4(5H)-dion
Clonazepam	(in doses higher than 2 mg)	5-(2-Chlorphenyl)-7-nitro-1,3-dihydro-2H-1,4-benzodiazepin-2-on
Clorazepate	(in doses higher than 50 mg dipotassium salt)	(RS)-7-Chlor-2-oxo-5-phenyl-2,3-dihydro-1H-1,4-benzodiazepin-3-carbonsäure
Clotiazepam	(in doses higher than 20 mg)	5-(2-Chlorphenyl)-7-ethyl-1-methyl-1,3-dihydro-2H-thieno[2,3-e] [1,4]diazepin-2-on
Cloxazolam		10-Chlor-11b-(2-chlorphenyl)-2,3,7,11b-tetrahydro[1,3]oxazolo[3,2-d] [1,4]benzodiazepin-6(5H)-on
	Cocaine (Benzoylecgoninmethylester)	Methyl[3β-(benzoyloxy)tropan-2β-carboxylat]
	Codeine (3-Methylmorphine) (in doses higher than 100 mg base or for treating addiction)	4,5a-Epoxy-3-methoxy-17-methylmorphin-7-en-6a-ol
Delorazepam		7-Chlor-5-(2-chlorphenyl)-1,3-dihydro-2H-1,4-benzodiazepin-2-on
Dexamfetamine	Dexamphetamin	(S)-1-Phenylpropan-2-ylazan
Dexmethylphenidate		Methyl[(R,R)(phenyl)(2-piperidyl)acetat]
	Diamorphine, only in preparations authorized for substitution therapy	[(5R,6S)-4,5-Epoxy-17-methylmorphin-7-en-3,6-diyl]diacetat
Diazepam	(in doses higher than 10 mg)	7-Chlor-1-methyl-5-phenyl-1,3-dihydro-2H-1,4-benzodiazepin-2-on
Dihydrocodeine	(in doses higher than 100 mg base or for treating addiction)	4,5a-Epoxy-3-methoxy-17-methylmorphinan-6a-ol
Dronabinol		(6aR,10aR)-6,6,9-Trimethyl-3-pentyl-6a,7,8,10a-tetrahydro-6H-benzo[c]chromen-1-ol
Estazolam	(in doses higher than 2 mg)	8-Chlor-6-phenyl-4H-[1,2,4]triazolo[4,3-a]benzodiazepin
Ethylloflazepate		Ethyl[7-chlor-5-(2-fluorphenyl)-2-oxo-2,3-dihydro-1H-1,4-benzodiazepin-3-carboxylat]
Etizolam		4-(2-Chlorphenyl)-2-ethyl-9-methyl-6H-thieno[3,2-f] [1,2,4]triazolo[4,3-a] [1,4]diazepin
Etorphine		(5R,6R,7R,14R)-4,5-Epoxy-7-[(R)-2-hydroxypentan-2-yl]-6-methoxy-17-methyl-6,14-ethenomorphinan-3-ol
Fenetylline		1,3-Dimethyl-7-[2-(1-phenylpropan-2-ylamino)ethyl]-3,7-dihydro-2H-purin-2,6(1H)-dion
Fenproporex	(in doses higher than 11 mg base)	(RS)-3-(1-Phenylpropan-2-ylamino)propannitril
Fentanyl		N-(1-Phenethyl-4-piperidyl)-N-phenylpropanamid
Fludiazepam		7-Chlor-5-(2-fluorphenyl)-1-methyl-1,3-dihydro-2H-1,4-benzodiazepin-2-on
Flunitrazepam		5-(2-Fluorphenyl)-1-methyl-7-nitro-1,3-dihydro-2H-1,4-benzodiazepin-2-on
Flurazepam	(in doses higher than 30 mg)	7-Chlor-1-(2-diethylaminoethyl)-5-(2-fluorphenyl)-1,3-dihydro-2H-1,4-benzodiazepin-2-on
Halazepam	(in doses higher than 120 mg)	7-Chlor-5-phenyl-1-(2,2,2-trifluorethyl)-1,3-dihydro-2H-1,4-benzodiazepin-2-on
Haloxazolam		10-Brom-11b-(2-fluorphenyl)-2,3,7,11b-tetrahydro[1,3]oxazolo[3,2-d] [1,4]benzodiazepin-6(5H)-on
Hydrocodone	Dihydrocodeinone	4,5a-Epoxy-3-methoxy-17-methylmorphinan-6-on
Hydromorphone	Dihydromorphinone	4,5a-Epoxy-3-hydroxy-17-methylmorphinan-6-on
	γ-Hydroxybutyric acid (GHB) (in doses higher than 2 g acid)	4-Hydroxybutansäure
Ketazolam	(in doses higher than 45 mg)	11-Chlor-2,8-dimethyl-12b-phenyl-8,12b-dihydro-4H-[1,3]oxazino[(3,2-d] [1,4]benzodiazepin-4,7(6H)-dion
Levacetylmethadol	Levomethadylacetat (LAAM)	[(3S,6S)-6-Dimethylamino-4,4- diphenylheptan-3-yl]acetat
Levomethadone		(R)-6-Dimethylamino-4,4-diphenylheptan-3-on
Lisdexamfetamine		(2S)-2,6-Diamino-N-[(2S)-1-phenylpropan-2-yl]hexanamid
Loprazolam	(in doses higher than 2.5 mg)	6-(2-Chlorphenyl)-2-[(Z)-4-methylpiperazin-1-ylmethylen]-8-nitro-2,4-dihydro-1H-imidazo[1,2-a] [1,4]benzodiazepin-1-on
Lorazepam	(in doses higher than 2.5 mg)	(RS)-7-Chlor-5-(2-chlorphenyl)-3-hydroxy-1,3-dihydro-2H-1,4-benzodiazepin-2-on
Lormetazepam	(in doses higher than 2 mg)	7-Chlor-5-(2-chlorphenyl)-3-hydroxy-1-methyl-1,3-dihydro-2H-1,4-benzodiazepin-2-on
Medazepam	(in doses higher than 10 mg)	7-Chlor-1-methyl-5-phenyl-2,3-dihydro-1H-1,4-benzodiazepin
Methadone		(RS)-6-Dimethylamino-4,4-diphenylheptan-3-on
Methylphenidate		Methyl[(RS;RS)(phenyl)(2-piperidyl)acetat]
Methylphenobarbital	Mephobarbital (in doses higher than 200 mg acid)	(RS)-5-Ethyl-1-methyl-5-phenyl-barbitursäure
Midazolam	(in doses higher than 15 mg)	8-Chlor-6-(2-fluorphenyl)-1-methyl-4H-imidazo[1,5-a] [1,4]benzodiazepin
Morphine		(5R,6S)-4,5-Epoxy-17-methyl-morphin-7-en-3,6-diol
Nabilone		(6aRS,10aRS)-1-Hydroxy-6,6-dimethyl-3-(2-methyloctan-2-yl)-6,6a,7,8,10,10a-hexahydro-9H-benzo[c]chromen-9-on
Nimetazepam		1-Methyl-7-nitro-5-phenyl-1,3-dihydro-2H-1,4-benzodiazepin-2-on
Nitrazepam	(in doses higher than 10 mg)	7-Nitro-5-phenyl-1,3-dihydro-2H-1,4-benzodiazepin-2-on
Nordazepam	(in doses higher than 15 mg)	7-Chlor-5-phenyl-1,3-dihydro-2H-1,4-benzodiazepin-2-on
Normethadone		6-Dimethylamino-4,4-diphenyl-hexan-3-on
	Opium	
Oxazepam	(in doses higher than 50 mg)	7-Chlor-3-hydroxy-5-phenyl-1,3-dihydro-2H-1,4-benzo-diazepin-2-on
Oxazolam	(in doses higher than 20 mg)	(2RS,11bSR)-10-Chlor-2-methyl-11b-phenyl-2,3,7,11b-tetrahydro[1,3]oxazolo[3,2-d] [1,4]benzodiazepin-6(5H)-on
Oxycodone	14-Hydroxydihydrocodeinone	4,5a-Epoxy-14-hydroxy-3-methoxy-17-methylmorphinan-6-on
	Papaver somniferum	
Pemoline	(in doses higher than 20 mg)	2-Imino-5-phenyl-1,3-oxazolidin-4-on
Pentazocine		(2R,6R,11R)-6,11-Dimethyl-3-(3-methylbut-2-en-1-yl)-1,2,3,4,5,6-hexahydro-2,6-methano-3-benzazocin-8-ol
Pentobarbital		(RS)-5-Ethyl-5-(pentan-2-yl)barbitursäure
Pethidine	Meperidine	Ethyl(1-methyl-4-phenyl-piperidin-4-carboxylat)
	Phenazepam	7-Brom-5-(2-chlorphenyl)-1,3-dihydro-2H-1,4-benzodiazepin-2-on
Phenobarbital	(in doses higher than 300 mg acid)	5-Ethyl-5-phenylbarbitursäure
Phentermine	(in doses higher than 15 mg base)	2-Benzylpropan-2-ylazan
Pinazepam		7-Chlor-5-phenyl-1-(prop-2-in1-yl)-1,3-dihydro-2H-1,4-benzodiazepin-2-on
Pipradrol		Diphenyl(2-piperidyl)methanol
Piritramide		1'-(3-Cyan-3,3-diphenylpropyl)[1,4'-bipiperidin]-4'-carboxamid
Prazepam	(in doses higher than 20 mg)	7-Chlor-1-cyclopropylmethyl-5-phenyl-1,3-dihydro-2H-1,4-benzodiazepin-2-on
Remifentanil		Methyl{3-[4-methoxycarbonyl-4-(N-phenylpropanamido)piperidino]propanoat}
Remimazolam		Methyl{3-[(4S)-8-brom-1-methyl-6-(pyridin-2-yl)-4H-imidazo[1,2-a][1,4]benzodiazepin-4-yl]propanoat}
Secobarbital		5-Allyl-5-(pentan-2-yl)barbitursäure
Sufentanil		N-{4-Methoxymethyl-1-[2-(2-thienyl)ethyl]-4-piperidyl}-N-phenylpropanamid
Tapentadol		3-[(2R,3R)-1-Dimethylamino-2-methylpentan-3-yl]phenol
Temazepam	(in doses higher than 20 mg)	(RS)-7-Chlor-3-hydroxy-1-methyl-5-phenyl-1,3-dihydro-2H-1,4-benzodiazepin-2-on
Tetrazepam	(in doses higher than 100 mg)	7-Chlor-5-(cyclohex-1-enyl)-1-methyl-1,3-dihydro-2H-1,4-benzodiazepin-2-on
Tilidine	trans-Tilidine (in doses higher than 300 mg base or with less than 7.5% Naloxone hydrochloride)	Ethyl[(1RS,2SR)-2-dimethyl-amino-1-phenylcyclohex-3-encarboxylat]
Triazolam	(in doses higher than 0.25 mg)	8-Chlor-6-(2-chlorphenyl)-1-methyl-4H-[1,2,4]triazolo[4,3-a] [1,4]benzodiazepin
Zolpidem	(in doses higher than 8.5 mg base = 10.625 mg tartrate)	N,N-Dimethyl-2-[6-methyl-2-(p-toly)imidazo[1,2-a]pyridin-3-yl]acetamid

As well as salts of the substances listed in Anlage III.

== See also ==
- Drug policy of Germany
- Narcotic Drugs Act
