= PF-03550096 =

Chemical compound

Identifiers
- IUPAC name: N-[(1S)-1-(aminocarbonyl)-2,2-dimethylpropyl]-2,3-dihydro-3-(3-hydroxy-3-methylbutyl)-2-oxo-1H-benzimidazole-1-carboxamide
- CAS Number: 910376-39-5
- PubChem CID: 24857887
- ChemSpider: 21378519
- UNII: E8S33VNW75
- CompTox Dashboard (EPA): DTXSID001010008

Chemical and physical data
- Formula: C_{19}H_{28}N_{4}O_{4}
- Molar mass: 376.457 g·mol^{−1}
- 3D model (JSmol): Interactive image
- SMILES: O=C(N1C(N(CCC(C)(O)C)C2=C1C=CC=C2)=O)N[C@@H](C(C)(C)C)C(N)=O
- InChI: InChI=1S/C19H28N4O4/c1-18(2,3)14(15(20)24)21-16(25)23-13-9-7-6-8-12(13)22(17(23)26)11-10-19(4,5)27/h6-9,14,27H,10-11H2,1-5H3,(H2,20,24)(H,21,25)/t14-/m1/s1; Key:GGNIFXBIJCNXCT-CQSZACIVSA-N

PF-03550096 is a drug that acts as a potent agonist for the CB_{2} cannabinoid receptor, with good selectivity over CB_{1} having K_{i} values of 7nM at CB_{2} and 1500nM at CB_{1}. It was originally developed by Pfizer in 2008 as a medication for irritable bowel syndrome, but has only progressed to animal studies.

== See also ==
- A-PBITMO
- AB-FUBINACA
- AB-PINACA
