= 5F-AMB =

Chemical compound

Legal status
- Legal status: BR: Class F2 (Prohibited psychotropics); CA: Schedule II; DE: Anlage II (Authorized trade only, not prescriptible); UK: Class B; US: Schedule I; UN: Psychotropic Schedule II; Illegal in China, Japan, Sweden, Singapore,

Identifiers
- IUPAC name: Methyl (2S)-2-{[1-(5-fluoropentyl)-1H-indazol-3-yl]formamido}-3-methylbutanoate
- CAS Number: 1801552-03-3 (S-isomer) 1715016-74-2 (racemate)
- PubChem CID: 119025812
- ChemSpider: 30646783
- UNII: DK24ID0BCL
- KEGG: C22802
- CompTox Dashboard (EPA): DTXSID501009985

Chemical and physical data
- Formula: C_{19}H_{26}FN_{3}O_{3}
- Molar mass: 363.433 g·mol^{−1}
- 3D model (JSmol): Interactive image
- SMILES: O=C(N[C@H](C(OC)=O)C(C)C)C1=NN(CCCCCF)C2=C1C=CC=C2
- InChI: InChI=1S/C19H26FN3O3/c1-13(2)16(19(25)26-3)21-18(24)17-14-9-5-6-10-15(14)23(22-17)12-8-4-7-11-20/h5-6,9-10,13,16H,4,7-8,11-12H2,1-3H3,(H,21,24)/t16-/m0/s1; Key:SAFXSUZMRLTBMM-INIZCTEOSA-N

5F-AMB (also known as 5F-MMB-PINACA and 5F-AMB-PINACA) is an indazole-based synthetic cannabinoid from the indazole-3-carboxamide family, which has been used as an active ingredient in synthetic cannabis products. It was first identified in Japan in early 2014. Although only very little pharmacological information about 5F-AMB itself exists, its 4-cyanobutyl analogue (instead of 5-fluoropentyl) has been reported to be a potent agonist for the CB_{1} receptor (K_{I} = 0.7 nM).

== Side effects ==
5F-AMB intoxication caused one fatality on its own, another through ketoacidosis in combination with AB-CHMINACA, AB-FUBINACA, AM-2201, 5F-APINACA, EAM-2201, JWH-018, JWH-122, MAM-2201, STS-135 and THJ-2201 and another fatality in combination with AB-CHMINACA and Diphenidine.

== Legality ==
In the United States, 5F-AMB is a Schedule I controlled substance.

5F-AMB is an Anlage II controlled substance in Germany as of May 2015.

Sweden's public health agency suggested classifying 5F-AMB as hazardous substance on November 10, 2014.

The state of Louisiana banned 5F-AMB through an emergency rule after it was detected in a synthetic cannabinoids product called "Kali Berry 2" on 3 June 2014.

5F-AMB is controlled by the Fifth Schedule of the Misuse of Drugs Act (MDA) in Singapore as of May 2015.

5F-AMB was also scheduled in Japan on July 25, 2014.

As of October 2015 5F-AMB is a controlled substance in China.

In December 2019, the UNODC announced scheduling recommendations placing 5F-MMB-PINACA as a Schedule II controlled research chemical.

== Nomenclature ==
The name 5F-MMB-PINACA comes from the systematic name Methyl 2-(1-(5-FluoroPentyl)-1H-INdAzole-3-CarboxAmide)-3-MethylButanoate using the EUDA naming system.

== See also ==
- 5F-AB-PINACA
- 5F-ADB
- 5F-APINACA
- AB-CHMINACA
- AB-FUBINACA
- AB-CHFUPYCA
- AB-PINACA
- ADB-CHMINACA
- ADB-FUBINACA
- ADB-PINACA
- ADBICA
- AMB-FUBINACA
- APICA
- APINACA
- MDMB-CHMICA
- MDMB-FUBINACA
- MMB-2201
- PX-3
