= ADB-P7AICA =

Synthetic cannabis ingredient

Legal status
- Legal status: DE: NpSG (Industrial and scientific use only); UK: Class B

Identifiers
- IUPAC name: N-[(2S)-1-amino-3,3-dimethyl-1-oxobutan-2-yl]-1-pentylpyrrolo[2,3-b]pyridine-3-carboxamide
- CAS Number: 2366273-07-4
- PubChem CID: 155538637
- ChemSpider: 109117928
- CompTox Dashboard (EPA): DTXSID901342387

Chemical and physical data
- Formula: C_{19}H_{28}N_{4}O_{2}
- Molar mass: 344.459 g·mol^{−1}
- 3D model (JSmol): Interactive image
- SMILES: NC(=O)[C@@H](NC(=O)c1cn(CCCCC)c2ncccc21)C(C)(C)C
- InChI: InChI=1S/C19H28N4O2/c1-5-6-7-11-23-12-14(13-9-8-10-21-17(13)23)18(25)22-15(16(20)24)19(2,3)4/h8-10,12,15H,5-7,11H2,1-4H3,(H2,20,24)(H,22,25)/t15-/m1/s1; Key:QDZHLYBDQFZWCJ-OAHLLOKOSA-N

ADB-P7AICA is a cannabinoid designer drug that has been found as an ingredient in some synthetic cannabis products, first identified by the DEA in early 2021.

== See also ==
- 5F-CUMYL-P7AICA
- ADBICA
- ADB-PINACA
