= CB-13 =

Chemical compound

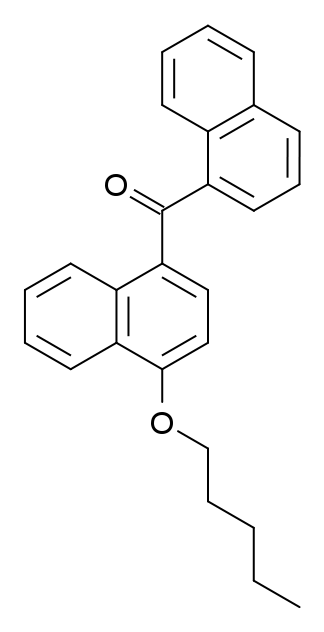

Legal status
- Legal status: CA: Schedule II

Identifiers
- IUPAC name: Naphthalen-1-yl-(4-pentyloxynaphthalen-1-yl)methanone
- CAS Number: 432047-72-8
- PubChem CID: 9799417
- ChemSpider: 7975182
- UNII: 9XRJ6055XT
- ChEMBL: ChEMBL244403
- CompTox Dashboard (EPA): DTXSID60430920

Chemical and physical data
- Formula: C_{26}H_{24}O_{2}
- Molar mass: 368.476 g·mol^{−1}
- 3D model (JSmol): Interactive image
- SMILES: c13ccccc1cccc3C(=O)c4ccc(OCCCCC)c2ccccc24
- InChI: InChI=1S/C26H24O2/c1-2-3-8-18-28-25-17-16-24(21-13-6-7-14-22(21)25)26(27)23-15-9-11-19-10-4-5-12-20(19)23/h4-7,9-17H,2-3,8,18H2,1H3; Key:RSUMDJRTAFBISX-UHFFFAOYSA-N

CB-13 (CRA13, SAB-378) is a cannabinoid drug, which acts as a potent agonist at both the CB_{1} and CB_{2} receptors, but has poor blood–brain barrier penetration, and so produces only peripheral effects at low doses, with symptoms of central effects such as catalepsy only appearing at much higher dose ranges. It has antihyperalgesic properties in animal studies, and has progressed to preliminary human trials.

== Legal Status ==
As of October 2015 CB-13 is a controlled substance in China.

CB-13 is a Schedule I controlled substance in North Dakota.

== See also ==
- A-PONASA
- AM-6545
- AZ-11713908
- Bunamidine
- CB-86
