= ADB-CHMINACA =

Chemical compound

Legal status
- Legal status: BR: Class F2 (Prohibited psychotropics); CA: Schedule II; DE: Anlage II (Authorized trade only, not prescriptible); UK: Class B; US: Schedule I; UN: Psychotropic Schedule II; Illegal in Singapore, Sweden, Switzerland

Identifiers
- IUPAC name: N-[(2S)-1-Amino-3,3-dimethyl-1-oxobutan-2-yl]-1-(cyclohexylmethyl)indazole-3-carboxamide
- CAS Number: 1185887-13-1
- PubChem CID: 68894304
- ChemSpider: 48059556
- UNII: SL4C60689M
- KEGG: C22698
- CompTox Dashboard (EPA): DTXSID301016900

Chemical and physical data
- Formula: C_{21}H_{30}N_{4}O_{2}
- Molar mass: 370.497 g·mol^{−1}
- 3D model (JSmol): Interactive image
- SMILES: CC(C)(C)[C@H](NC(=O)c1nn(CC2CCCCC2)c3ccccc13)C(N)=O
- InChI: InChI=1S/C21H30N4O2/c1-21(2,3)18(19(22)26)23-20(27)17-15-11-7-8-12-16(15)25(24-17)13-14-9-5-4-6-10-14/h7-8,11-12,14,18H,4-6,9-10,13H2,1-3H3,(H2,22,26)(H,23,27)/t18-/m1/s1; Key:ZWCCSIUBHCZKOY-GOSISDBHSA-N

ADB-CHMINACA (also known as ADMB-CHMINACA and MAB-CHMINACA) is an indazole-based synthetic cannabinoid. It is a potent agonist of the CB_{1} receptor with a binding affinity of K_{i} = 0.289 nM and was originally developed by Pfizer in 2009 as an analgesic medication. It was identified in cannabinoid blends in Japan in early 2015.

== Side effects ==
There have been a number of reported cases of deaths and hospitalizations in relation to this synthetic cannabinoid.

== Legal status ==
In the United States, ADB-CHMINACA is a Schedule I controlled substance. Prior to its listing at the federal level in 2018, Louisiana placed ADB-CHMINACA on its Schedule I list by emergency scheduling in 2014.

Sweden's public health agency suggested to classify ADB-CHMINACA as hazardous substance on November 10, 2014.

ADB-CHMINACA is listed in the Fifth Schedule of the Misuse of Drugs Act (MDA) and therefore illegal in Singapore as of May 2015.

ADB-CHMINACA is illegal in Switzerland as of December 2015.

== Metabolism ==
Ten ADB-CHMINACA major metabolites were identified in several incubations with cryopreserved human hepatocytes. Most transformations occurred at the cyclohexylmethyl tail of the compound.

== See also ==
- 5F-AB-PINACA
- 5F-ADB
- 5F-AMB
- 5F-APINACA
- AB-FUBINACA
- AB-CHFUPYCA
- AB-CHMINACA
- AB-PINACA
- ADB-BINACA
- ADB-FUBINACA
- ADB-HEXINACA
- ADB-PINACA
- ADBICA
- APICA
- APINACA
- MDMB-CHMICA
- MDMB-CHMINACA
- MDMB-FUBINACA
- PX-3
