= ADB-PINACA =

Chemical compound

Legal status
- Legal status: CA: Schedule II; DE: NpSG (Industrial and scientific use only); UK: Class B; US: Schedule I

Identifiers
- IUPAC name: N-(1-Amino-3,3-dimethyl-1-oxo-2-butanyl)-1-pentyl-1H-indazole-3-carboxamide
- CAS Number: 1633766-73-0
- PubChem CID: 86280478
- ChemSpider: 29342129
- UNII: U1Q4F41C9U
- CompTox Dashboard (EPA): DTXSID301010007

Chemical and physical data
- Formula: C_{19}H_{28}N_{4}O_{2}
- Molar mass: 344.459 g·mol^{−1}
- 3D model (JSmol): Interactive image
- SMILES: CCCCCN1C2=CC=CC=C2C(=N1)C(=O)NC(C(=O)N)C(C)(C)C
- InChI: InChI=1S/C19H28N4O2/c1-5-6-9-12-23-14-11-8-7-10-13(14)15(22-23)18(25)21-16(17(20)24)19(2,3)4/h7-8,10-11,16H,5-6,9,12H2,1-4H3,(H2,20,24)(H,21,25); Key:FWTARAXQGJRQKN-UHFFFAOYSA-N

ADB-PINACA is a cannabinoid designer drug that is an ingredient in some synthetic cannabis products. It is a potent agonist of the CB_{1} receptor and CB_{2} receptor with EC_{50} values of 0.52 nM and 0.88 nM respectively. Like MDMB-FUBINACA, this compound incorporates the unnatural amino acid tert-leucine.

== Side effects ==
ADB-PINACA has been linked to multiple hospitalizations and deaths due to its use.

== Metabolism ==
Nineteen ADB-PINACA major metabolites were identified in several incubations with cryopreserved human hepatocytes. Major metabolic reactions included pentyl hydroxylation, hydroxylation followed by oxidation (ketone formation), and glucuronidation.

== Legality ==
ADB-PINACA is listed in the Fifth Schedule of the Misuse of Drugs Act (MDA) and therefore illegal in Singapore as of May 2015.

In the United States, it is a Schedule I controlled substance. but its 5'-bromo analog ADB-5'Br-PINACA is not as of October 20th, 2023.

As of October 2015 ADB-PINACA is a controlled substance in China.

== See also ==
- ADB-5'Br-PINACA
- 5F-AB-PINACA
- 5F-ADB
- 5F-ADB-PINACA
- 5F-AMB
- 5F-APINACA
- AB-FUBINACA
- AB-CHFUPYCA
- AB-CHMINACA
- AB-PINACA
- ADB-5'Br-PINACA
- ADB-BUTINACA
- ADB-CHMINACA
- ADB-HEXINACA
- ADB-FUBINACA
- ADB-P7AICA
- ADBICA
- ADMB-3TMS-PRINACA
- APICA
- APINACA
- MDMB-CHMICA
- PX-3
