= ADBICA =

Group of stereoisomers

Clinical data
- ATC code: racemate: none

Legal status
- Legal status: CA: Schedule II; DE: NpSG (Industrial and scientific use only); UK: Class B

Identifiers
- IUPAC name: N-(1-Amino-3,3-dimethyl-1-oxobutan-2-yl)-1-pentyl-1H-indole-3-carboxamide
- CAS Number: racemate: 1445583-48-1
- PubChem CID: racemate: 72710773
- ChemSpider: racemate: 29342130
- UNII: racemate: Q71G788A6H; S isomer: P0248QCZ04
- CompTox Dashboard (EPA): racemate: DTXSID801009996

Chemical and physical data
- Formula: C_{20}H_{29}N_{3}O_{2}
- Molar mass: 343.471 g·mol^{−1}
- 3D model (JSmol): racemate: Interactive image; S isomer: Interactive image
- SMILES: racemate: CCCCCN1C=C(C2=CC=CC=C21)C(=O)NC(C(=O)N)C(C)(C)C; S isomer: CCCCCN1C=C(C2=CC=CC=C21)C(=O)N[C@H](C(=O)N)C(C)(C)C
- InChI: racemate: InChI=1S/C20H29N3O2/c1-5-6-9-12-23-13-15(14-10-7-8-11-16(14)23)19(25)22-17(18(21)24)20(2,3)4/h7-8,10-11,13,17H,5-6,9,12H2,1-4H3,(H2,21,24)(H,22,25); Key:IXUYMXAKKYWKRG-UHFFFAOYSA-N

ADBICA (also known as ADB-PICA) is a designer drug identified in synthetic cannabis blends in Japan in 2013. ADBICA had not previously been reported in the scientific literature prior to its sale as a component of synthetic cannabis blends. ADBICA features a carboxamide group at the 3-indole position, like SDB-001 and STS-135. The stereochemistry of the tert-butyl side-chain in the product is unresolved, though in a large series of indazole derivatives structurally similar to ADBICA that are disclosed in Pfizer patent WO 2009/106980, activity resides exclusively in the (S) enantiomers. ADBICA is a potent agonist of the CB_{1} receptor and CB_{2} receptor with an EC_{50} value of 0.69 nM and 1.8 nM respectively.

== Legal Status ==
As of October 2015 ADBICA is a controlled substance in China.

== See also ==
- 5F-AB-PINACA
- 5F-ADB
- 5F-ADBICA
- 5F-AMB
- 5F-APINACA
- AB-FUBINACA
- AB-CHFUPYCA
- AB-CHMINACA
- AB-PINACA
- ADB-CHMINACA
- ADB-FUBINACA
- ADB-PINACA
- ADB-P7AICA
- APICA
- APINACA
- MDMB-CHMICA
- PF-03550096
- STS-135
- PX-3
