= 5F-APINACA =

Chemical compound

Clinical data
- Other names: 5F-AKB-48, 5F-AKB48

Legal status
- Legal status: BR: Class F2 (Prohibited psychotropics); CA: Schedule II; DE: Anlage II (Authorized trade only, not prescriptible); UK: Class B; US: Schedule I; UN: Psychotropic Schedule II

Identifiers
- IUPAC name: N-(adamantan-1-yl)-1-(5-fluoropentyl)-1H-indazole-3-carboxamide
- CAS Number: 1400742-13-3
- PubChem CID: 71711119
- ChemSpider: 29339965
- UNII: TX64ZY5P0R
- KEGG: C22695
- CompTox Dashboard (EPA): DTXSID80856800

Chemical and physical data
- Formula: C_{23}H_{30}FN_{3}O
- Molar mass: 383.511 g·mol^{−1}
- 3D model (JSmol): Interactive image
- SMILES: O=C(NC1(C[C@@H]2C3)C[C@H](C2)C[C@H]3C1)C4=NN(CCCCCF)C5=CC=CC=C54
- InChI: InChI=1S/C23H30FN3O/c24-8-4-1-5-9-27-20-7-3-2-6-19(20)21(26-27)22(28)25-23-13-16-10-17(14-23)12-18(11-16)15-23/h2-3,6-7,16-18H,1,4-5,8-15H2,(H,25,28)/t16-,17+,18-,23?; Key:UCMFSGVIEPXYIV-XHICYHHKSA-N

5F-APINACA (also known as A-5F-PINACA, 5F-AKB-48 or 5F-AKB48) is an indazole-based synthetic cannabinoid that has been sold online as a designer drug. Structurally it closely resembles cannabinoid compounds from patent WO 2003/035005 but with a 5-fluoropentyl chain on the indazole 1-position, and 5F-APINACA falls within the claims of this patent, as despite not being disclosed as an example, it is very similar to the corresponding pentanenitrile and 4-chlorobutyl compounds which are claimed as examples 3 and 4.

5F-APINACA was first identified in South Korea. It is expected to be a potent agonist of the CB_{1} receptor and CB_{2} receptor. Its metabolism has been described in literature.

== Pharmacology ==
5F-APINACA acts as a full agonist with a binding affinity of 1.94 nM at CB_{1} and 0.266 nM at CB_{2} cannabinoid receptors.

== Legality ==
In the United States, 5F-APINACA is a Schedule I controlled substance.

5F-APINACA is an Anlage II controlled drug in Germany since July 2013.

As of October 2015, 5F-APINACA is a controlled substance in China.

5F-APINACA is banned in the Czech Republic.

== See also ==
- 5F-ADB
- 5F-AMB
- AB-FUBINACA
- AB-CHFUPYCA
- AB-PINACA
- ADB-CHMINACA
- ADB-FUBINACA
- ADB-PINACA
- ADBICA
- APICA
- APINACA
- FUB-APINACA
- MDMB-CHMICA
- PX-3
