= ADB-FUBINACA =

Chemical compound

Legal status
- Legal status: BR: Class F2 (Prohibited psychotropics); CA: Schedule II; DE: Anlage II (Authorized trade only, not prescriptible); UK: Class B; US: Schedule I

Identifiers
- IUPAC name: N-(1-Amino-3,3-dimethyl-1-oxobutan-2-yl)-1-(4-fluorobenzyl)-1H-indazole-3-carboxamide
- CAS Number: 1185282-00-1
- PubChem CID: 70969086
- ChemSpider: 29763706
- UNII: 05235E1S2O
- KEGG: C22699
- CompTox Dashboard (EPA): DTXSID701009981

Chemical and physical data
- Formula: C_{21}H_{23}FN_{4}O_{2}
- Molar mass: 382.439 g·mol^{−1}
- 3D model (JSmol): Interactive image
- SMILES: O=C(NC(C(N)=O)C(C)(C)C)C1=NN(CC2=CC=C(F)C=C2)C3=C1C=CC=C3
- InChI: InChI=InChI=1S/C21H23FN4O2/c1-21(2,3)18(19(23)27)24-20(28)17-15-6-4-5-7-16(15)26(25-17)12-13-8-10-14(22)11-9-13/h4-11,18H,12H2,1-3H3,(H2,23,27)(H,24,28)/t18-/m1/s1; Key:ZSSGCSINPVBLQD-GOSISDBHSA-N

ADB-FUBINACA (ADMB-FUBINACA) is a designer drug identified in synthetic cannabis blends in Japan in 2013. In 2018, it was the third-most common synthetic cannabinoid identified in drugs seized by the Drug Enforcement Administration.

The name is an acronym for N-(1-Amino-3,3-Dimethyl-1-oxoButan-2-yl)-1-(4-FlUoroBenzyl)-1H-INdAzole-3-CarboxAmide.

The (S)-enantiomer of ADB-FUBINACA is described in a 2009 Pfizer patent and has been reported to be a potent agonist of the CB_{1} receptor and the CB_{2} receptor with EC_{50} values of 1.2 nM and 3.5 nM, respectively. ADB-FUBINACA features a carboxamide group at the 3-indazole position, like SDB-001 and STS-135. ADB-FUBINACA appears to be the product of rational drug design, since it differs from AB-FUBINACA only by the replacement of the isopropyl group with a tert-butyl group.

An analogue of ADB-FUBINACA, ADSB-FUB-187, containing a more functionalized carboxamide substituent was recently reported.

== Side effects ==
One death through coronary arterial thrombosis has been linked to ADB-FUBINACA intoxication.

== Metabolism ==
Twenty-three ADB-FUBINACA major metabolites were identified in several incubations with cryopreserved human hepatocytes. Major metabolic pathways were alkyl and indazole hydroxylation, terminal amide hydrolysis, subsequent glucuronide conjugations, and dehydrogenation.

== Legality ==
In the United States, ADB-FUBINACA is a Schedule I controlled substance.

== See also ==
- 5F-AB-PINACA
- 5F-ADB
- 5F-AMB
- 5F-APINACA
- AB-CHFUPYCA
- AB-PINACA
- ADB-BINACA
- ADB-CHMINACA
- ADB-PINACA
- ADBICA
- ADSB-FUB-187
- APINACA
- MDMB-CHMICA
- MDMB-FUBINACA
- PF-03550096
- PX-3
