= APICA (synthetic cannabinoid drug) =

Chemical compound

Legal status
- Legal status: CA: Schedule II; DE: Anlage II (Authorized trade only, not prescriptible); UK: Class B; Illegal in China and Japan

Identifiers
- IUPAC name: N-(1-Adamantyl)-1-pentylindole-3-carboxamide
- CAS Number: 1345973-50-3
- PubChem CID: 71308155
- ChemSpider: 29341717
- UNII: HKU510FH74
- CompTox Dashboard (EPA): DTXSID80745427

Chemical and physical data
- Formula: C_{24}H_{32}N_{2}O
- Molar mass: 364.533 g·mol^{−1}
- 3D model (JSmol): Interactive image
- SMILES: CCCCCn1cc(C(=O)NC23CC4CC(CC(C4)C2)C3)c5ccccc15
- InChI: InChI=1S/C24H32N2O/c1-2-3-6-9-26-16-21(20-7-4-5-8-22(20)26)23(27)25-24-13-17-10-18(14-24)12-19(11-17)15-24/h4-5,7-8,16-19H,2-3,6,9-15H2,1H3,(H,25,27); Key:MDJYHWLDDJBTMX-UHFFFAOYSA-N

APICA (2NE1, SDB-001, N-(1-adamantyl)-1-pentyl-1H-indole-3-carboxamide) is an indole based drug that acts as a potent agonist for the cannabinoid receptors.

It had never previously been reported in the scientific or patent literature, and was first identified by laboratories in Japan in March 2012 as an ingredient in synthetic cannabis smoking blends, along with its indazole derivative APINACA (sold as "AKB48").

Structurally it closely resembles cannabinoid compounds from patent WO 2003/035005 but with an indole core instead of indazole, and a simple pentyl chain on the indole 1-position. Given the known metabolic liberation (and presence as an impurity) of amantadine in the related compound APINACA, it is suspected that metabolic hydrolysis of the amide group of APICA may also release amantadine.

Pharmacological testing determined APICA to have an IC_{50} of 175 nM at CB_{1}, only slightly less potent than JWH-018 which had an IC_{50} of 169 nM, but over four times more tightly binding than APINACA, which had an IC_{50} of 824 nM. The first published synthesis and pharmacological evaluation of APICA revealed that it acts as a full agonist at CB_{1} (EC_{50} = 34 nM) and CB_{2} receptors (EC_{50} = 29 nM). Furthermore, APICA possesses cannabis-like effects in rats, and appears to be less potent than JWH-018 but more potent than THC.

== Legal Status ==
As of October 2015, APICA is a controlled substance in China.

== See also ==
- 5F-AB-PINACA
- 5F-ADB
- 5F-AMB
- 5F-APINACA
- AB-FUBINACA
- AB-CHFUPYCA
- AB-CHMINACA
- AB-PINACA
- ADAMANTYL-THPINACA
- ADB-CHMINACA
- ADB-FUBINACA
- ADB-PINACA
- ADBICA
- MDMB-CHMICA
- SDB-006
- STS-135 (drug)
- PX-3
