= AB-FUBINACA =

Chemical compound

Legal status
- Legal status: BR: Class F2 (Prohibited psychotropics); CA: Schedule II; DE: Anlage II (Authorized trade only, not prescriptible); UK: Class B; US: Schedule I; UN: Psychotropic Schedule II; Illegal in China

Identifiers
- IUPAC name: N-[(2S)-1-Amino-3-methyl-1-oxobutan-2-yl]-1-[(4-fluorophenyl)methyl]indazole-3-carboxamide
- CAS Number: 1185282-01-2
- PubChem CID: 58124325
- ChemSpider: 28537614
- UNII: I7PZF0KTFK
- KEGG: C22703
- CompTox Dashboard (EPA): DTXSID70728845

Chemical and physical data
- Formula: C_{20}H_{21}FN_{4}O_{2}
- Molar mass: 368.412 g·mol^{−1}
- 3D model (JSmol): Interactive image
- SMILES: CC(C)[C@H](NC(=O)c1nn(Cc2ccc(F)cc2)c3ccccc13)C(N)=O
- InChI: InChI=1S/C20H21FN4O2/c1-12(2)17(19(22)26)23-20(27)18-15-5-3-4-6-16(15)25(24-18)11-13-7-9-14(21)10-8-13/h3-10,12,17H,11H2,1-2H3,(H2,22,26)(H,23,27)/t17-/m0/s1; Key:AKOOIMKXADOPDA-KRWDZBQOSA-N

AB-FUBINACA (Correctly named AMB-FUBINACA using EUDA nomenclature, however this name is erroneously associated with MMB-FUBINACA) is a psychoactive drug that acts as a potent agonist for the cannabinoid receptors, with K_{i} values of 0.9 nM at CB_{1} and 23.2 nM at CB_{2} and EC_{50} values of 1.8 nM at CB_{1} and 3.2 nM at CB_{2}. It was originally developed by Pfizer in 2009 as an analgesic medication but was never pursued for human use. In 2012, it was discovered as an ingredient in synthetic cannabinoid blends in Japan, along with a related compound AB-PINACA, which had not previously been reported.

Its use has been linked to hospitalizations and deaths.

== Legality ==
=== United States of America ===
It was designated as a Schedule I controlled substance in the United States in January 2014.

=== Finland ===
In Finland AB-FUBINACA is scheduled in government decree on psychoactive substances banned from the consumer market as of 19 October 2017.

=== Germany ===
It is an Anlage II controlled substance in Germany as of November 2014.

=== China ===
Since October 2015 AB-FUBINACA is a controlled substance in China.

=== Others ===
In December 2019, the UNODC announced scheduling recommendations placing AB-FUBINACA as a controlled research chemical into Schedule II. 101789

== Mass overdoses due to adulterated K2 ==
On August 15, 2018, 70 people within the city of New Haven, Connecticut, started overdosing near Yale University campus.

Most news reports only used the name "K2" which can refer to any synthetic cannabinoid consumed by smoking. One news report did use the name "fubinaca" and this is understood to have meant AB-FUBINACA rather than another analogue.

By the end of the week, the total number of overdosed had risen to over 100 people needing transport to local emergency rooms. Three men were arrested, charged as drug dealers selling synthetic cannabis according to news reports. First responders concluded that the overdoses were caused by opiate adulterants, as victims responded to Narcan. However, later news reports only said that the material had tested positive for the generic "K2" and did not mention charges for distributing or possessing fentanyl in the arrests.

Almost all of the overdoses occurred on the New Haven Green, a large downtown park that is heavily travelled and very popular with the homeless population. There were no deaths reported as a result of the incident after 2 days.

== Nomenclature ==
AMB-FUBINACA is the correct systematic name derived using the EUDA synthetic cannabinoid naming scheme: N-[(2S)-1-Amino-3-methyl-1-oxobutan-2-yl]-1-[(4-fluoro-benzyl]indazole-3-carboxamide.

AB-FUBINACA is specifically named in the naming scheme briefing as the first example of an attempt to derive a systematic short name from the IUPAC name, by Uchiyama et al. in 2012. Due to the naming preceding the scheme, the use of AB-FUBINACA has stuck for this compound and the systematic name is less widely used, despite the fact that AB-FUBINACA describes the 1-amino-1-oxobutane (without a methyl at the 3 position) analogue according to the naming scheme.

== See also ==
- 5F-AB-PINACA
- 5F-ADB
- 5F-AMB
- 5F-APINACA
- AB-CHFUPYCA
- AB-CHMINACA
- AB-PINACA
- ADB-CHMINACA
- ADB-FUBINACA
- ADBICA
- AMB-FUBINACA
- APICA
- APINACA
- Benzydamine
- MDMB-CHMICA
- MDMB-FUBINACA
- NESS-040C5
- PF-03550096
- PX-3
