= 5F-AB-PINACA =

Chemical compound

Legal status
- Legal status: CA: Schedule II; DE: Anlage II (Authorized trade only, not prescriptible); UK: Class B; US: Schedule I; Illegal in China and Singapore

Identifiers
- IUPAC name: N-[(2S)-1-Amino-3-methyl-1-oxobutan-2-yl]-1-(5-fluoropentyl)indazole-3-carboxamide
- CAS Number: 1800101-60-3
- PubChem CID: 91936927
- ChemSpider: 29763723
- UNII: 3L83B2298V
- CompTox Dashboard (EPA): DTXSID401009970

Chemical and physical data
- Formula: C_{18}H_{25}FN_{4}O_{2}
- Molar mass: 348.422 g·mol^{−1}
- 3D model (JSmol): Interactive image
- SMILES: CC(C)[C@H](NC(=O)c1nn(CCCCCF)c2ccccc12)C(N)=O
- InChI: InChI=1S/C18H25FN4O2/c1-12(2)15(17(20)24)21-18(25)16-13-8-4-5-9-14(13)23(22-16)11-7-3-6-10-19/h4-5,8-9,12,15H,3,6-7,10-11H2,1-2H3,(H2,20,24)(H,21,25)/t15-/m0/s1; Key:WCBYXIBEPFZUBG-HNNXBMFYSA-N

5F-AB-PINACA is an indazole-based synthetic cannabinoid that is derived from a series of compounds originally developed by Pfizer in 2009 as an analgesic medication, and has been sold online as a designer drug.

5F-AB-PINACA has been reported to be a potent agonist of the CB_{1} receptor and CB_{2} receptor with EC_{50} values of 0.48 nM and 2.6 nM respectively. Its metabolism has been described in literature.

== Legality ==
=== China ===
As of October 2015 5F-AB-PINACA is a controlled substance in China.

=== Germany ===
5F-AB-PINACA is an Anlage II controlled substance in Germany as of May 2015.

=== Singapore ===
It is also controlled under the Fifth Schedule of the Misuse of Drugs Act (MDA) in Singapore as of May 2015.

== See also ==
- 5F-ADB
- 5F-AMB
- 5F-CUMYL-PINACA
- AB-FUBINACA
- AB-CHFUPYCA
- AB-PINACA
- ADB-CHMINACA
- ADB-FUBINACA
- ADB-PINACA
- ADBICA
- APICA
- APINACA
- MDMB-CHMICA
- PX-3
