= APINACA =

Chemical compound

Legal status
- Legal status: BR: Class F2 (Prohibited psychotropics); CA: Schedule II; DE: Anlage II (Authorized trade only, not prescriptible); NZ: Temporary Class; UK: Class B; US: Schedule I; Also illegal in Czech Republic, Japan, Latvia, and Singapore

Identifiers
- IUPAC name: N-(1-Adamantyl)-1-pentylindazole-3-carboxamide
- CAS Number: 1345973-53-6 (1-adamantyl isomer) 1400742-54-2 (2-adamantyl isomer)
- PubChem CID: 57404063
- ChemSpider: 28189076
- UNII: MHR0400Y84
- CompTox Dashboard (EPA): DTXSID90928683

Chemical and physical data
- Formula: C_{23}H_{31}N_{3}O
- Molar mass: 365.521 g·mol^{−1}
- 3D model (JSmol): Interactive image
- SMILES: C3C4CC2CC3CC(C4)(C2)NC(=O)c(nn1CCCCC)c5c1cccc5
- InChI: InChI=1S/C23H31N3O/c1-2-3-6-9-26-20-8-5-4-7-19(20)21(25-26)22(27)24-23-13-16-10-17(14-23)12-18(11-16)15-23/h4-5,7-8,16-18H,2-3,6,9-15H2,1H3,(H,24,27); Key:UCTCCIPCJZKWEZ-UHFFFAOYSA-N

APINACA (AKB48, N-(1-adamantyl)-1-pentyl-1H-indazole-3-carboxamide) is a drug that acts as a reasonably potent agonist for the cannabinoid receptors. It is a full agonist at CB_{1} with an EC_{50} of 142 nM and K_{i} of 3.24 nM (compared to the K_{i} of Δ^{9}-THC at 28.35 nM and JWH-018 at 9.62 nM), while at CB_{2} it acts as a partial agonist with an EC_{50} of 141 nM and K_{i} of 1.68 nM (compared to the K_{i} of Δ^{9}-THC at 37.82 nM and JWH-018 at 8.55 nM). Its pharmacological characterization has also been reported in a discontinued patent application.

It had never previously been reported in the scientific or patent literature, and was first identified by laboratories in Japan in March 2012 as an ingredient in synthetic cannabis smoking blends, along with a related compound APICA. It was deliberately being sold named after a popular girl band called AKB48.

Structurally, it closely resembles cannabinoid compounds from a 2003 University of Connecticut patent, but with a simple pentyl chain on the indazole 1-position, and APINACA falls within the claims of this patent despite not being disclosed as an example.

== Legality ==
APINACA was made illegal in Japan in 2012, and was banned as a temporary class drug in New Zealand from 13 July 2012.

APINACA has been banned in Latvia since 14 November 2013.

Since 2013, APINACA has been a Schedule I controlled substance in the United States.

It is also banned in Germany as an Anlage II controlled drug.

APINACA is listed in the Fifth Schedule of the Misuse of Drugs Act (MDA) and therefore illegal in Singapore as of May 2015.

As of October 2015 APINACA is a controlled substance in China.

APINACA is banned in the Czech Republic.

== Detection ==
A forensic standard of APINACA is available, and the compound has been posted on the Forendex website of potential drugs of abuse.

== See also ==
- 5F-AB-PINACA
- 5F-ADB
- 5F-AMB
- 5F-APINACA
- 5F-CUMYL-PINACA
- AB-CHFUPYCA
- AB-CHMINACA
- AB-FUBINACA
- AB-PINACA
- ADAMANTYL-THPINACA
- ADB-CHMINACA
- ADB-FUBINACA
- ADB-PINACA
- ADBICA
- APICA
- FUB-APINACA
- MDMB-CHMICA
- PX-3
- SDB-001
- STS-135
- Synthetic cannabinoid
- Synthetic cannabis
