= AB-PINACA =

Chemical compound

Legal status
- Legal status: BR: Class F2 (Prohibited psychotropics); CA: Schedule II; DE: Anlage II (Authorized trade only, not prescriptible); UK: Class B; US: Schedule I

Identifiers
- IUPAC name: N-[(1S)-1-(Aminocarbonyl)-2-methylpropyl]-1-pentyl-1H-indazole-3-carboxamide
- CAS Number: 1445752-09-9
- PubChem CID: 71301472
- ChemSpider: 28537615
- UNII: 6J3KC3S2PA
- KEGG: C22704
- CompTox Dashboard (EPA): DTXSID00904034

Chemical and physical data
- Formula: C_{18}H_{26}N_{4}O_{2}
- Molar mass: 330.432 g·mol^{−1}
- 3D model (JSmol): Interactive image
- SMILES: CCCCCn1c2ccccc2c(n1)C(=O)N[C@@H](C(C)C)C(=O)N
- InChI: InChI=1S/C18H26N4O2/c1-4-5-8-11-22-14-10-7-6-9-13(14)16(21-22)18(24)20-15(12(2)3)17(19)23/h6-7,9-10,12,15H,4-5,8,11H2,1-3H3,(H2,19,23)(H,20,24)/t15-/m0/s1; Key:GIMHPAQOAAZSHS-HNNXBMFYSA-N

AB-PINACA is a compound that was first identified as a component of synthetic cannabis products in Japan in 2012.

It was originally developed by Pfizer in 2009 as an analgesic medication.

AB-PINACA acts as a potent agonist for the CB_{1} receptor (K_{i} = 2.87 nM, EC_{50} = 1.2 nM) and CB_{2} receptor (K_{i} = 0.88 nM, EC_{50} = 2.5 nM) and fully substitutes for Δ^{9}-THC in rat discrimination studies, while being 1.5x more potent.

There have been a number of reported cases of deaths and hospitalizations in relation to this synthetic cannabinoid.

== Legal status ==
=== Germany ===
AB-PINACA is an Anlage II controlled substance in Germany as of November 2014.

=== Singapore ===
It is listed in the Fifth Schedule of the Misuse of Drugs Act and so is illegal in Singapore, as of May 2015.

=== United States ===
It is a Schedule I controlled substance in the United States.

=== China ===
It is a controlled substance in China as of October 2015.

=== France ===
It is a controlled substance in France as of March 2017.

== See also ==
- 5F-AB-PINACA
- 5F-ADB
- 5F-AMB
- 5F-APINACA
- 5F-CUMYL-PINACA
- AB-CHFUPYCA
- AB-FUBINACA
- AB-PICA
- ADB-CHMINACA
- ADB-FUBINACA
- ADB-PINACA
- ADBICA
- APICA
- APINACA
- MDMB-CHMICA
- PX-3
