= Indazole =

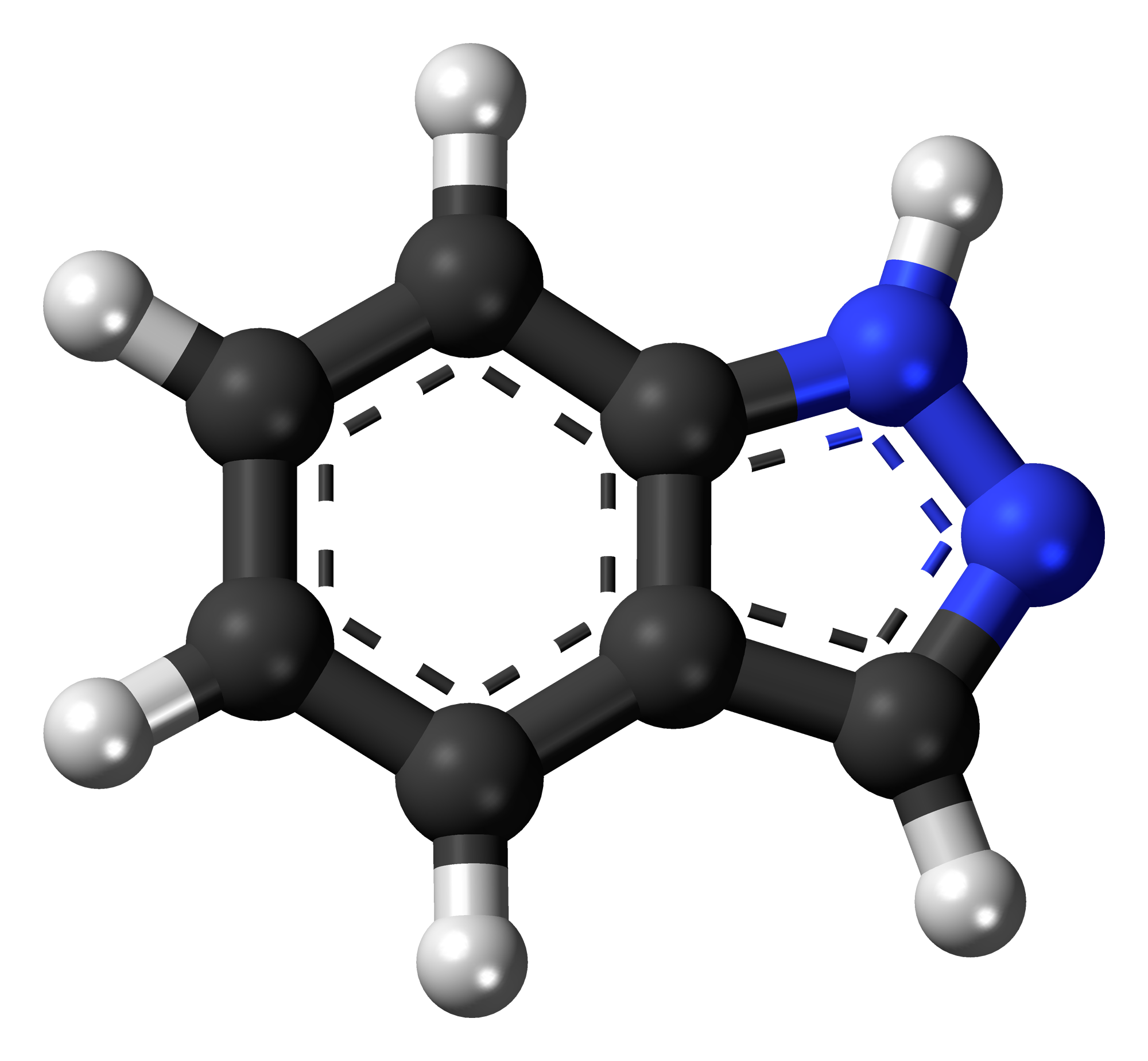

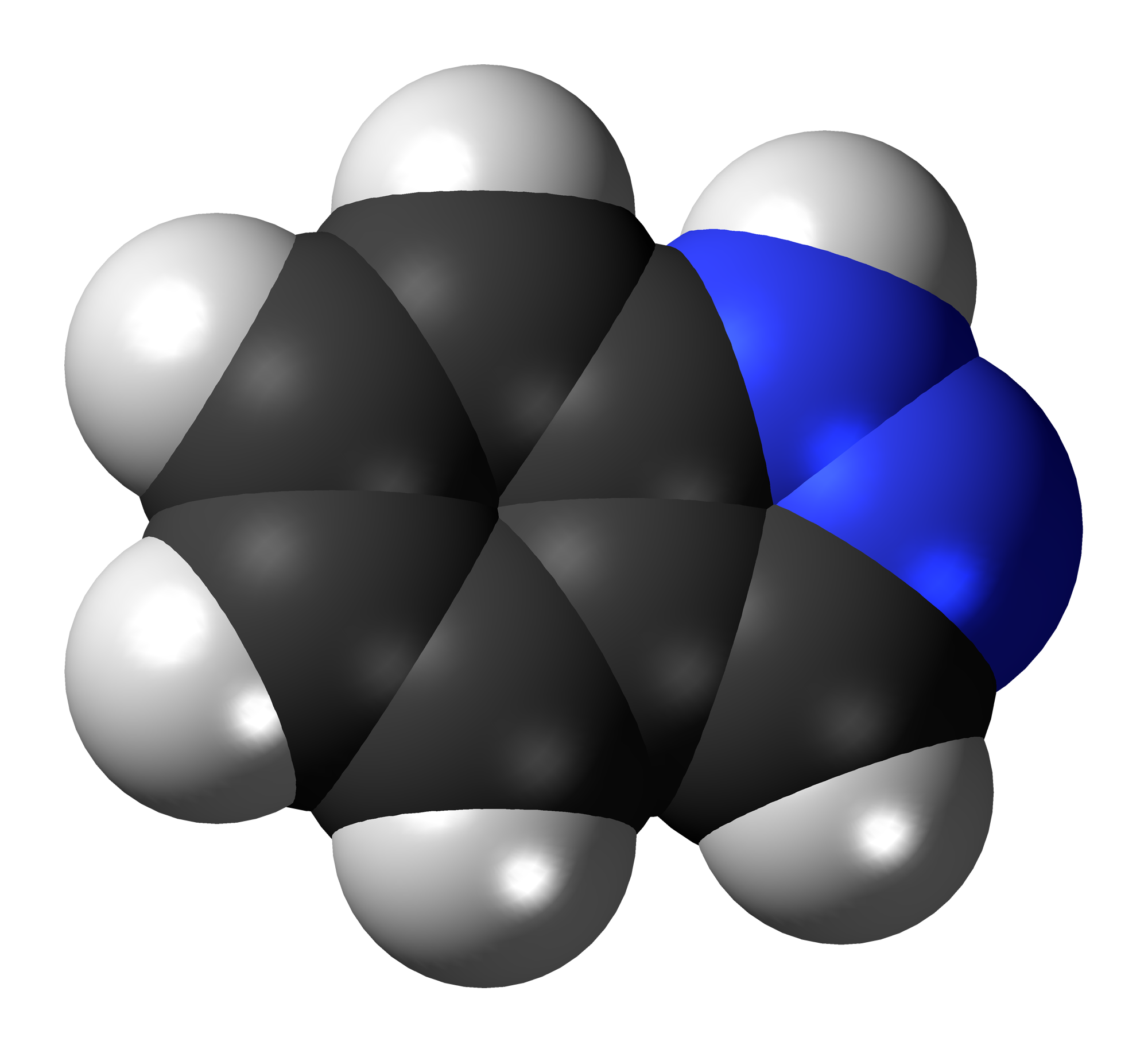

Names
- Preferred IUPAC name 1H-Indazole

Identifiers
CAS Number	271-44-3
3D model (JSmol)	Interactive image
ChEBI	CHEBI:36670
ChEMBL	ChEMBL86795
ChemSpider	8866
ECHA InfoCard	100.005.436
PubChem CID	9221
UNII	7C4VQE5C03
CompTox Dashboard (EPA)	DTXSID4075374
- InChI: InChI=1S/C7H6N2/c1-2-4-7-6(3-1)5-8-9-7/h1-5H,(H,8,9) Key: BAXOFTOLAUCFNW-UHFFFAOYSA-N; InChI=1/C7H6N2/c1-2-4-7-6(3-1)5-8-9-7/h1-5H,(H,8,9) Key: BAXOFTOLAUCFNW-UHFFFAOYAQ
- SMILES: c2ccc1[nH]ncc1c2

Properties
Chemical formula	C_{7}H_{6}N_{2}
Molar mass	118.14 g/mol
Melting point	147 to 149 °C (297 to 300 °F; 420 to 422 K)
Boiling point	270 °C (518 °F; 543 K)
- Except where otherwise noted, data are given for materials in their standard state (at 25 °C [77 °F], 100 kPa). Infobox references

Indazole, also called isoindazole, is a heterocyclic aromatic organic compound. This bicyclic compound consists of the fusion of benzene and pyrazole.

Indazole is an amphoteric molecule which can be protonated to an indazolium cation or deprotonated to an indazolate anion. The corresponding pKa values are 1.04 for the equilibrium between indazolium cation and indazole and 13.86 for the equilibrium between indazole and indazolate anion.

Indazole derivatives display a broad variety of biological activities.

Indazoles are rare in nature. The alkaloids nigellicine, nigeglanine, and nigellidine are indazoles. Nigellicine was isolated from the widely distributed plant Nigella sativa L. (black cumin). Nigeglanine was isolated from extracts of Nigella glandulifera.

The Davis–Beirut reaction can generate 2H-indazoles.

Indazole, C_{7}H_{6}N_{2}, was obtained by E. Fischer (Ann. 1883, 221, p. 280) by heating ortho-hydrazine cinnamic acid,

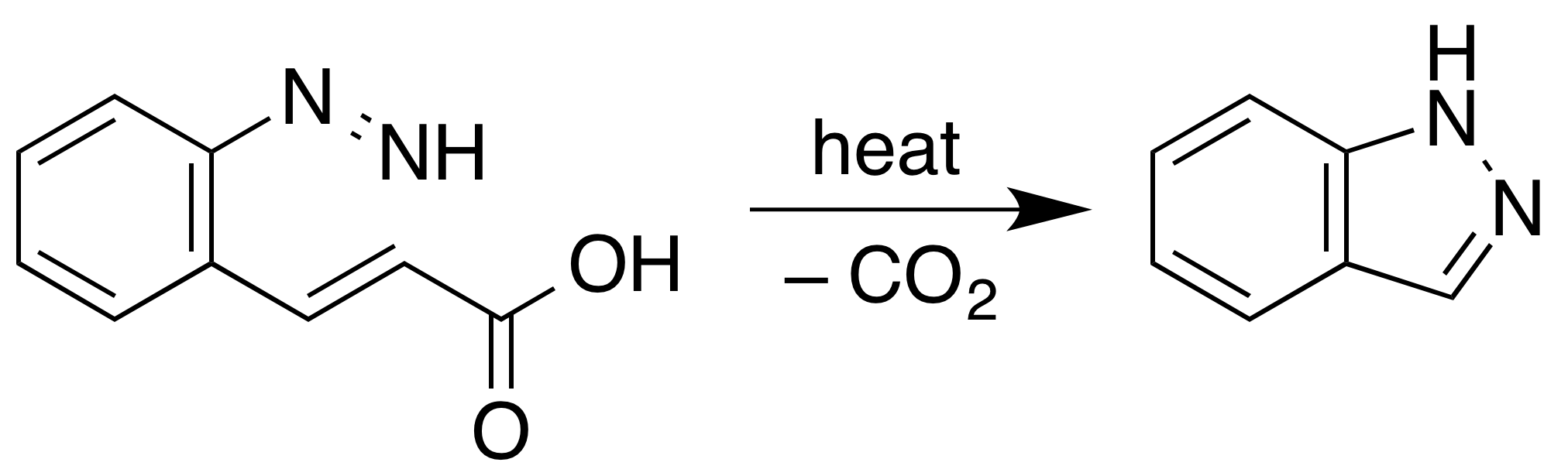

== Drugs made from Indazole ==
Benzydamine, commonly branded as Tantum Verde and Difflam, is the most well known Indazole derivative. It is a nonsteroidal anti-inflammatory, with local anaesthetic and analgesic properties for pain relief and anti-inflammatory treatment of inflammatory conditions of the mouth and throat.

Marsanidine [1034875-38-1]

== See also ==
- Indole, an analog with only one nitrogen atom in position 1.
- Benzimidazole, an analog with the nitrogen atoms in positions 1 and 3.
- Simple aromatic rings
- 7-Nitroindazole, an indazole-based nitric oxide synthase inhibitor
