= MDMB-CHMICA =

Chemical compound

Legal status
- Legal status: CA: Schedule II; DE: Anlage II (Authorized trade only, not prescriptible); UK: Class B; US: Schedule I; UN: Psychotropic Schedule II; Illegal in Austria, China, Brazil, Croatia, Denmark, Estonia, Finland, Greece, Hungary, Latvia, Lithuania, Luxembourg, Norway, Poland, Turkey, Sweden and Switzerland

Identifiers
- IUPAC name: Methyl (2S)-2-{[1-(cyclohexylmethyl)-1H-indol-3-yl]formamido}-3,3-dimethylbutanoate
- CAS Number: 1971007-95-0
- PubChem CID: 125181404
- ChemSpider: 34450863
- UNII: X6JI7EA6EJ
- KEGG: C22787

Chemical and physical data
- Formula: C_{23}H_{32}N_{2}O_{3}
- Molar mass: 384.520 g·mol^{−1}
- 3D model (JSmol): Interactive image
- SMILES: COC(=O)[C@@H](NC(=O)c1cn(CC2CCCCC2)c3ccccc13)C(C)(C)C
- InChI: InChI=1S/C23H32N2O3/c1-23(2,3)20(22(27)28-4)24-21(26)18-15-25(14-16-10-6-5-7-11-16)19-13-9-8-12-17(18)19/h8-9,12-13,15-16,20H,5-7,10-11,14H2,1-4H3,(H,24,26)/t20-/m1/s1; Key:SRJKCVHWIDFUBO-HXUWFJFHSA-N

MDMB-CHMICA is an indole-based synthetic cannabinoid that is a potent agonist of the CB_{1} receptor and has been sold online as a designer drug. While MDMB-CHMICA was initially sold under the name "MMB-CHMINACA", the compound corresponding to this code name (i.e. the isopropyl instead of t-butyl analogue of MDMB-CHMINACA) has been identified on the designer drug market in 2015 as AMB-CHMINACA.

== Chemistry ==
Several commercial samples of MDMB-CHMICA were found to exclusively contain the (S)-enantiomer based on vibrational and electronic circular dichroism spectroscopy and X-ray crystallography. An (S)-configuration for the tert-leucinate group is unsurprising since MDMB-CHMICA is likely synthesized from the abundant and inexpensive "L" form of the appropriate tert-leucinate reactant.

== Pharmacology ==
MDMB-CHMICA acts as a highly potent full agonist of the CB_{1} receptor with an efficacy of 94% and an EC_{50} value of 0.14 nM, which is approximately 8 times lower than the EC_{50} of JWH-018 (1.13 nM) and twofold lower than AB-CHMINACA (0.27 nM).

=== Metabolism ===
MDMB-CHMICA's main metabolic reactions comprise mono-hydroxylations and hydrolysis of the carboxylic ester function. In total, 31 metabolites could be identified in vivo.

== Side effects ==
Seventy-one serious adverse events, including 42 acute intoxications and 29 deaths (Germany (5), Hungary (3), Poland (1), Sweden (9), United Kingdom (10), Norway (1)) that occurred in nine European countries between 2014 and 2016 have been associated with MDMB-CHMICA.

Side effects such as unconsciousness or coma, hyperemesis, nausea, seizures, convulsions, tachycardia, bradycardia, mydriasis, syncope, spontaneous urinating and defecating, shortness of breath, somnolence, respiratory acidosis, metabolic acidosis, collapse, lower limbs paralysis, chest pain, aggression and severe disturbance of behaviour were reported.

== Legal status ==
In the United States, MDMB-CHMICA is a Schedule I controlled substance.

MDMB-CHMICA is illegal in Austria, Canada, China, Croatia, Denmark, Estonia, Finland, Germany, Greece, Hungary, Latvia, Lithuania, Louisiana, Luxembourg, Norway, Portugal, Turkey, the UK, Sweden and Switzerland.

In August 2016 the European Commission proposed a ban on MDMB-CHMICA across the European Union. In 27 February 2017 the Commission adopted an implementing act in banning MDMB-CHMICA, and Member States shall take the necessary measures to subject it to control measures and criminal penalties no later than by 4 March 2018.

=== Seizures ===
Over 3600 MDMB-CHMICA seizures between 2014 and 2016 in 19 member states of the European Union have been reported to the European Monitoring Centre for Drugs and Drug Addiction (EMCDDA), including a 40 kg seizure [sic] in Luxembourg in December 2014.

== See also ==
- AB-CHMINACA
- ADB-CHMINACA
- AMB-CHMINACA
- MDMB-CHMINACA
- MDMB-FUBINACA
- PX-3
