= MN-18 =

Chemical compound

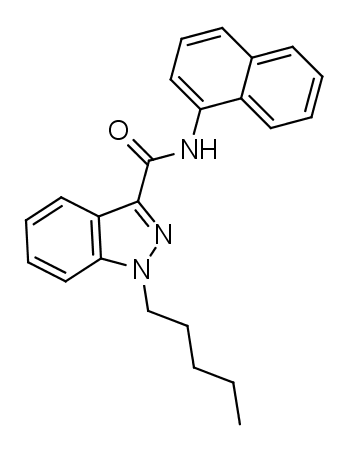

Legal status
- Legal status: CA: Schedule II; DE: NpSG (Industrial and scientific use only); UK: Class B

Identifiers
- IUPAC name: N-(naphthalen-1-yl)-1-pentyl-1H-indazole-3-carboxamide
- CAS Number: 1391484-80-2
- PubChem CID: 119058030
- ChemSpider: 29763729
- UNII: GP2N1PG5X2
- CompTox Dashboard (EPA): DTXSID301010033

Chemical and physical data
- Formula: C_{23}H_{23}N_{3}O
- Molar mass: 357.457 g·mol^{−1}
- 3D model (JSmol): Interactive image
- SMILES: CCCCCn1nc(c2c1cccc2)C(=O)Nc1cccc2c1cccc2
- InChI: InChI=1S/C23H23N3O/c1-2-3-8-16-26-21-15-7-6-13-19(21)22(25-26)23(27)24-20-14-9-11-17-10-4-5-12-18(17)20/h4-7,9-15H,2-3,8,16H2,1H3,(H,24,27); Key:UJKHLVOEXULDRU-UHFFFAOYSA-N

MN 18 is an indazole-based synthetic cannabinoid that is an agonist for the cannabinoid receptors, with K_{i} values of 45.72 nM at CB_{1} and 11.098 nM at CB_{2} and EC_{50} values of 2.028 nM at CB_{1} and 1.233 nM at CB_{2}, and has been sold online as a designer drug. It is the indazole core analogue of NNE1. Given the known metabolic liberation (and presence as an impurity) of amantadine in the related compound APINACA, it is suspected that metabolic hydrolysis of the amide group of MN-18 may release 1-naphthylamine, a known carcinogen. MN-18 metabolism has been described in literature.

== Legal status ==
MN-18 is banned in Sweden. On 15 September 2014 the Turkey government banned the sale of MN-18.

== See also ==
- 5F-NNE1
- 5F-PB-22
- AM-2201
- BB-22
- FUB-JWH-018
- AB-FUBINACA
- ADB-FUBINACA
- AMB-FUBINACA
- FDU-PB-22
- FUB-144
- FUB-APINACA
- FUB-PB-22
- MDMB-FUBICA
- MDMB-FUBINACA
- PB-22
