= QMPSB =

Chemical compound

Legal status
- Legal status: CA: Schedule II; DE: NpSG (Industrial and scientific use only); UK: Under Psychoactive Substances Act

Identifiers
- IUPAC name: 8-quinolinyl 4-methyl-3-(1-piperidinylsulfonyl)benzoate
- CAS Number: 312606-87-4
- PubChem CID: 3929482
- ChemSpider: 3151524
- UNII: 55Q8B94HS5
- ChEMBL: ChEMBL245876
- CompTox Dashboard (EPA): DTXSID901045939

Chemical and physical data
- Formula: C_{22}H_{22}N_{2}O_{4}S
- Molar mass: 410.49 g·mol^{−1}
- 3D model (JSmol): Interactive image
- SMILES: Cc1ccc(cc1[S](=O)(=O)N2CCCCC2)C(=O)Oc3cccc4cccnc34
- InChI: InChI=1S/C22H22N2O4S/c1-16-10-11-18(15-20(16)29(26,27)24-13-3-2-4-14-24)22(25)28-19-9-5-7-17-8-6-12-23-21(17)19/h5-12,15H,2-4,13-14H2,1H3; Key:WORIMYADZQJWOU-UHFFFAOYSA-N

QMPSB is an arylsulfonamide-based synthetic cannabinoid that has been sold as a designer drug.

QMPSB was first discovered by Nathalie Lambeng and colleagues in 2007. It acts as a full agonist of the CB_{1} receptor and CB_{2} receptor with K_{i} values of 3 nM and 4 nM, respectively. Many related derivatives were subsequently produced, with the main focus of this work being to increase selectivity for the non-psychoactive CB_{2} receptor. This work led on from an earlier series of sulfamoyl benzamide derivatives for which a patent was filed in 2004.

The quinolin-8-yl ester motif of QMPSB led to the discovery of other designer cannabinoids such as PB-22 and BB-22.

== See also ==
- 2F-QMPSB
- 5F-PB-22
- AB-MDMSBA
- FDU-PB-22
- FUB-PB-22
- NM-2201
- O-2050
- O-2113
- SDB-005
