= FDU-PB-22 =

Chemical compound

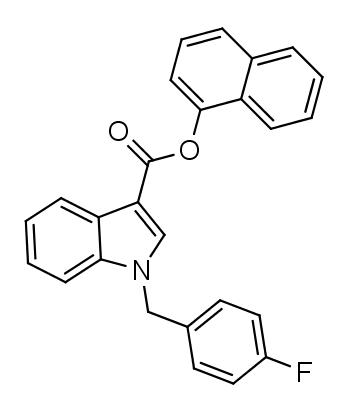

Legal status
- Legal status: CA: Schedule II; DE: Anlage II (Authorized trade only, not prescriptible); UK: Class B

Identifiers
- IUPAC name: naphthalen-1-yl 1-[(4-fluorophenyl)methyl]-1H-indole-3-carboxylate
- CAS Number: 1883284-94-3
- PubChem CID: 119025888
- ChemSpider: 29763739
- UNII: 85E88884ZQ
- CompTox Dashboard (EPA): DTXSID901016910

Chemical and physical data
- Formula: C_{26}H_{18}FNO_{2}
- Molar mass: 395.433 g·mol^{−1}
- 3D model (JSmol): Interactive image
- SMILES: O=C(OC1=C(C=CC=C2)C2=CC=C1)C3=CN(CC4=CC=C(F)C=C4)C5=C3C=CC=C5
- InChI: InChI=1S/C26H18FNO2/c27-20-14-12-18(13-15-20)16-28-17-23(22-9-3-4-10-24(22)28)26(29)30-25-11-5-7-19-6-1-2-8-21(19)25/h1-15,17H,16H2; Key:RCEKSVIFQKKFLS-UHFFFAOYSA-N

FDU-PB-22 (or NA-FUBIC named using EMCDDA naming standards) is a derivative of JWH-018 that is presumed to be a potent agonist of the CB_{1} receptor, and has been sold online as a designer drug.

== Pharmacology ==
FDU-PB-22 acts as a full agonist with a binding affinity of 1.19nM at CB_{1} and 2.43nM at CB_{2} cannabinoid receptors.

== Naming ==
FDU-PB-22 was sold as such, despite differing from the PB-22 backbone by the replacement of the 8-quinolinyl group with a 1-naphthyl group. This name was later used in research papers studying its role in the synthetic cannabinoid market. In 2022 the European Union Drugs Agency published a standardised naming method from which the name NA-FUBIC is derived.

== Legal status ==
FDU-PB-22 is a controlled substance in Germany and is banned in Japan and Sweden.

== See also ==
- 5F-PB-22
- AM-2201
- BB-22
- FUB-JWH-018
- AB-FUBINACA
- ADB-FUBINACA
- AMB-FUBINACA
- FUB-144
- FUB-APINACA
- FUB-PB-22
- MDMB-FUBICA
- MDMB-FUBINACA
- PB-22
