= FUB-PB-22 =

Chemical compound

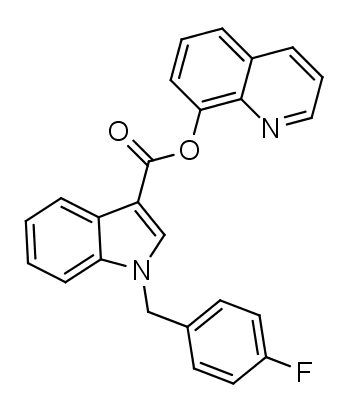

Legal status
- Legal status: CA: Schedule II; DE: Anlage II (Authorized trade only, not prescriptible); UK: Class B

Identifiers
- IUPAC name: quinolin-8-yl 1-[(4-fluorophenyl)methyl]-1H-indole-3-carboxylate
- CAS Number: 1800098-36-5
- PubChem CID: 91936864
- ChemSpider: 29763736
- UNII: DS46154N3F
- CompTox Dashboard (EPA): DTXSID601016909

Chemical and physical data
- Formula: C_{25}H_{17}FN_{2}O_{2}
- Molar mass: 396.421 g·mol^{−1}
- 3D model (JSmol): Interactive image
- SMILES: Fc1ccc(cc1)Cn1cc(c2c1cccc2)C(=O)Oc1cccc2c1nccc2
- InChI: InChI=1S/C25H17FN2O2/c26-19-12-10-17(11-13-19)15-28-16-21(20-7-1-2-8-22(20)28)25(29)30-23-9-3-5-18-6-4-14-27-24(18)23/h1-14,16H,15H2; Key:ROHVURVXAOMRJY-UHFFFAOYSA-N

FUB-PB-22 (QUFUBIC) is an indole-based synthetic cannabinoid that is a potent agonist of the CB_{1} receptor and has been sold online as a designer drug.

== Pharmacology ==
FUB-PB-22 acts as a full agonist with a binding affinity of 0.386nM at CB_{1} and 0.478nM at CB_{2} cannabinoid receptors.

== Legal status ==
FUB-PB-22 is an Anlage II controlled substance in Germany. It was scheduled in Japan in July 2014.

As of October 2015 FUB-PB-22 is a controlled substance in China.

It is also banned in Sweden.

== See also ==
- 2F-QMPSB
- 5F-PB-22
- AM-2201
- BB-22
- FUB-JWH-018
- AB-FUBINACA
- ADB-FUBINACA
- AMB-FUBINACA
- FDU-PB-22
- FUB-144
- FUB-APINACA
- MDMB-FUBICA
- MDMB-FUBINACA
- PB-22
