= FUB-JWH-018 =

Chemical compound

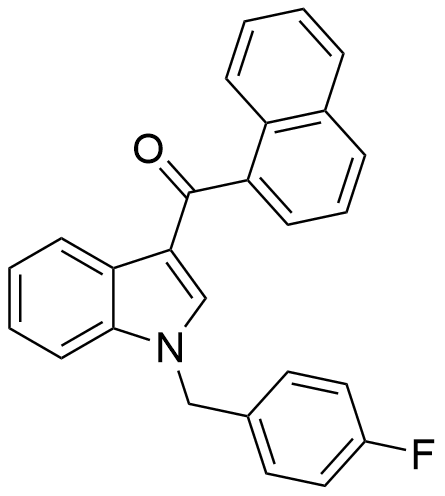

Legal status
- Legal status: CA: Schedule II; DE: NpSG (Industrial and scientific use only); UK: Class B; US: Schedule I

Identifiers
- IUPAC name: (1-(4-Fluorobenzyl)-1H-indol-3-yl)(naphthalen-1-yl)methanone
- CAS Number: 2365471-45-8
- ChemSpider: 34450892
- UNII: U0Z5KO073G
- CompTox Dashboard (EPA): DTXSID401032541

Chemical and physical data
- Formula: C_{26}H_{18}FNO
- Molar mass: 379.434 g·mol^{−1}
- 3D model (JSmol): Interactive image
- SMILES: O=C(C1=CC=CC2=C1C=CC=C2)C3=CN(CC4=CC=C(F)C=C4)C5=CC=CC=C53
- InChI: InChI=1S/C26H18FNO/c27-20-14-12-18(13-15-20)16-28-17-24(22-9-3-4-11-25(22)28)26(29)23-10-5-7-19-6-1-2-8-21(19)23/h1-15,17H,16H2; Key:VREQTLWJHFQLEX-UHFFFAOYSA-N

FUB-JWH-018 (also known as FUB-018) is a naphthoylindole-based synthetic cannabinoid, representing a molecular hybrid of JWH-018 and AB-FUBICA or ADB-FUBICA.

== Legal status ==
In the United States, all CB_{1} receptor agonists of the 3-(1-naphthoyl)indole class such as FUB-JWH-018 are Schedule I Controlled Substances.

As of October 2015 FUB-JWH-018 is a controlled substance in China.

== See also ==
- AB-FUBINACA
- ADB-FUBINACA
- AMB-FUBINACA
- CHM-018
- FUB-144
- FUB-APINACA
- FDU-PB-22
- FUB-PB-22
- MDMB-FUBICA
- MDMB-FUBINACA
