= Matt Bowden =

New Zealand musician, designer drug creator, and activist

- Born: Matt Bowden
- Genres: Progressive rock, Fusion, Metal, Electronic
- Occupations: Musician, activist
- Instruments: Vocals, Guitar, Bass, Synths, Piano, Composition, Arrangement, Programming
- Years active: 1989–present

Matt "Starboy" Bowden is a rock musician and activist from New Zealand. Bowden promoted party pills as safer substitutes for methamphetamine addicts, and lobbied for regulated, legal sale of psychoactive substances. He performs musically as Starboy.

Matt Bowden was involved in the distribution and popularization of party pills. After the death of a family member from ecstasy overdose Bowden worked to develop and promote safer alternatives to methamphetamine.

His musical single Flying, released 29 October 2012, debuted at number five in the NZ Single charts and number 29 in the New Zealand Top 40 Singles charts.

== Biography ==
Bowden was born in Auckland. His father was an internet pioneer and his mother was a piano teacher. He studied guitar under Nigel Gavin and played in Gavin's acoustic avant garde jazz ensemble "Gitbox Rebellion." At 18, after studying music at Auckland University, Bowden joined Auckland metal band "The Highwaymen" on lead guitar. Together the band recorded a first album "Torrent of Darkness. After a break-up Bowden played eclectic guitar solos on drummer Gavin Stokes' album Continuum, and worked as a guitar teacher for 7 years.

== Party Pills Advocacy ==
Following a friend's death, Bowden sought to identify and distribute safer alternatives to illicit substances and identified benzylpiperazine, which was originally developed as a potential antidepressant by Burroughs Wellcome but was rejected after it was found to have similar effects to amphetamines, though less potent. Products were developed for amphetamine addicts and initially targeted toward them as a substitute therapy.

Following increased restrictions on the sale and marketing of party pills, Bowden was involved in the establishment of STANZ (Social Tonic Association of New Zealand) and the development of a "Code of Practice" to help producers of party pills comply with the new regulations.

Bowden worked to develop products that would pass the tests required by the Psychoactive Substances Bill.

== EASE ==
One of the most high-profile party pills products that the operation Bowden worked under developed was EASE. Stargate International began 'clinical trials' to distribute EASE, later identified as methylone, after initially receiving authorization from the New Zealand Ministry of Health to import and sell the product.

The initial documentation provided to the Ministry of Health by Stargate stated:

Methylone is structurally and pharmacologically similar in some respects to the controlled and potentially neurotoxic drug of abuse MDMA, although its structure falls outside the definition of "Amphetamine analogues" as defined in Part 7 of Schedule C of New Zealand’s Misuse of Drugs Act.

Following the screening of a locally produced documentary into EASE entitled The Truth Files, Associate Health Minister Jim Anderton released a statement classifying EASE as an controlled product, and provided the following assessment:

Yesterday, Associate Health Minister Jim Anderton said advice from the chair of the Expert Advisory Committee on Drugs, Dr Ashley Bloomfield, showed Ease contained a substance called methylone, an "analogue" – similar to – cathinone, which is a Class B amphetamine controlled under the Misuse of Drugs Act.

This announcement resulted in the termination of the trial, on the basis that although methylone was not explicitly scheduled and fell outside the strict definitions of an "amphetamine analogue" in the Misuse of Drugs Act, it was considered to be "substantially similar" to methcathinone and thus considered by law enforcement authorities to be a Class C controlled drug.

== PB-22 and 5F-PB-22 ==
The company Stargate International invented the synthetic cannabinoids PB-22 (QUPIC/SGT-21) and 5F-PB-22. PB-22 and 5F-PB-22 are credited with being the first synthetic cannabinoids to feature a quinoline substructure with an ester linker at the indole 3-position. No intellectual property protection was filed during development. Activities with PB-22 and 5F-PB-22 are controlled in both New Zealand and the United States.

Despite Bowden claiming that his cannabinoids were safe PB-22 has been attributed to at least 4 deaths. and adverse medical events including a person and dog who had a seizure after consumption.

== Starboy ==
In 2011, around his 40th birthday, Bowden introduced the musical persona 'Starboy' as a psychedelic rock music act.

According to reports in the Sunday Star-Times, the event included, "women hanging from the ceiling on trapezes, others in bunny suits, loads of booze, and Bowden up on stage with his band amid lasers and costumed dancers, wearing Kiss-style makeup, big boots and long shiny coat, and evidently "enjoying himself much more than anyone else was".

Under the banner of 'Starboy', Bowden has released progressive rock music and a short film entitled Starboy Eternity. In media interviews he has described his persona as, "an interdimensional traveller... in time and space responding to the cries of this troubled earth... It's about raising consciousness and hope and freedom. About love. What the world needs". Bowden stated in an interview with the New Zealand Herald, "my market has to be overseas now, because in New Zealand the public don't like it if you've changed from one thing to something else."

=== Starboy's Eternity ===
Starboy's Eternity is a 10-minute-3-second music video for Eternity the song of the same name released in November 2011 and directed by Zac Blair.

Initially a stand-alone music video, the production expanded into a three-part mini-movie revolving around a young girl and her fight against the "Strangers" who have invaded her village. Production began in November 2009 with shooting commencing June 2011 in various locations around Auckland, New Zealand.

==== Development ====
According to Bowden, "the image of a child moving through a sleeping village came to him while he sung the lyrics in reaction to the funky bass line. The song is about enlightenment and the lyrics borrowed from classical poetry so it suited that era, with the addition of sci-fi content and Zac Blair's direction."

== Discography ==
Date	Title	Group	Notes
1989	Torrent of Darkness	The Highwaymen	(NZ) Debut album
1996	Continuum	Gavin Stokes	(NZ) Matt Bowden on guitar
October 2010	Induction EP	Starboy	(NZ) Debut Starboy release
November 2011	Eternity	Starboy	(NZ) Part 1 of a 3 part steampunk, music video mini movie
October 2012	Flying	Starboy	(NZ) Single released 29 October 2012, Flying debuted at number five in the NZ Single charts and number 29 in the New Zealand Top 40 Singles charts

== See also ==
- PB-22
- 5F-PB-22
- QUCHIC
- QUPIC
- SDB-001
- SDB-005
- Methylone
