= MAM-2201 =

Chemical compound

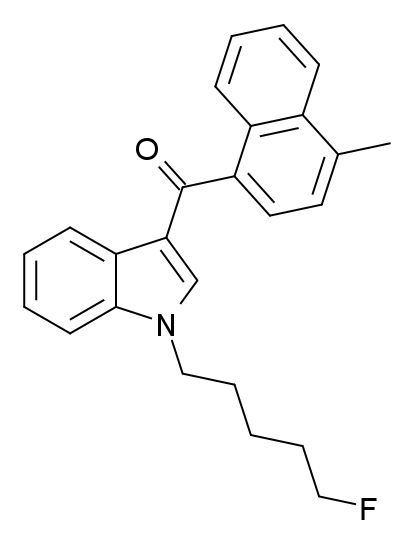

Legal status
- Legal status: BR: Class F2 (Prohibited psychotropics); CA: Schedule II; DE: Anlage II (Authorized trade only, not prescriptible); NZ: Temporary Class; UK: Class B; US: Schedule I

Identifiers
- IUPAC name: (1-(5-Fluoropentyl)-1H-indol-3-yl)(4-methyl-1-naphthalenyl)methanone
- CAS Number: 1354631-24-5
- PubChem CID: 66570720
- ChemSpider: 28289977
- UNII: P4KP9PRG29
- KEGG: C22772
- CompTox Dashboard (EPA): DTXSID20159387
- ECHA InfoCard: 100.257.545

Chemical and physical data
- Formula: C_{25}H_{24}FNO
- Molar mass: 373.471 g·mol^{−1}
- 3D model (JSmol): Interactive image
- SMILES: FCCCCCn(c4)c2ccccc2c4C(=O)c3ccc(C)c1ccccc13
- InChI: InChI=1S/C25H24FNO/c1-18-13-14-22(20-10-4-3-9-19(18)20)25(28)23-17-27(16-8-2-7-15-26)24-12-6-5-11-21(23)24/h3-6,9-14,17H,2,7-8,15-16H2,1H3; Key:IGBHZHCGWLHBAE-UHFFFAOYSA-N

MAM-2201 (4'-methyl-AM-2201, 5"-fluoro-JWH-122) is a drug that presumably acts as a potent agonist for the cannabinoid receptors. It had never previously been reported in the scientific or patent literature, and was first identified by laboratories in the Netherlands and Germany in June 2011 as an ingredient in synthetic cannabis smoking blends. Like RCS-4 and AB-001, MAM-2201 thus appears to be a novel compound invented by "research chemical" suppliers specifically for grey-market recreational use. Structurally, MAM-2201 is a hybrid of two known cannabinoid compounds JWH-122 and AM-2201, both of which had previously been used as active ingredients in synthetic cannabis blends before being banned in many countries.

A study of MAM-2201 in rats showed that it causes neurofunctional disruptions. A later study demonstrated that MAM-2201 bound to and activated human CB1 and CB2 cannabinoid receptors and substituted for THC in THC drug discrimination in mice.

== Legal status ==
In the United States, all CB_{1} receptor agonists of the 3-(1-naphthoyl)indole class such as MAM-2201 are Schedule I Controlled Substances.

MAM-2201 has been banned by being added to the temporary class drug schedule in New Zealand, effective from 13 July 2012.

As of October 2015 MAM-2201 is a controlled substance in China.

== See also ==
- 5F-JWH-398
- EAM-2201
- NM-2201
- THJ-2201
- Structural scheduling of synthetic cannabinoids
