= C23H22N2O2 =

The molecular formula C_{23}H_{22}N_{2}O_{2} may refer to:

- PB-22, a designer drug offered by online vendors as a cannabimimetic agent
- SDB-005, an indazole-based synthetic cannabinoid
