= C25H24N2O2 =

The molecular formula C_{25}H_{24}N_{2}O_{2} may refer to:

- JWH-200, an analgesic chemical from the aminoalkylindole family
- QUCHIC, a designer drug offered by online vendors as a cannabimimetic agent
