= C15H23N3O4S =

Pharmaceutical compounds with molecular formula C15H23N3O4S

The molecular formula C_{15}H_{23}N_{3}O_{4}S (molar mass: 341.42 g/mol, exact mass: 341.1409 u) may refer to:

- AB-MDMSBA
- Ciclacillin
- Sulpiride
- Levosulpiride
