= 2F-QMPSB =

Chemical compound

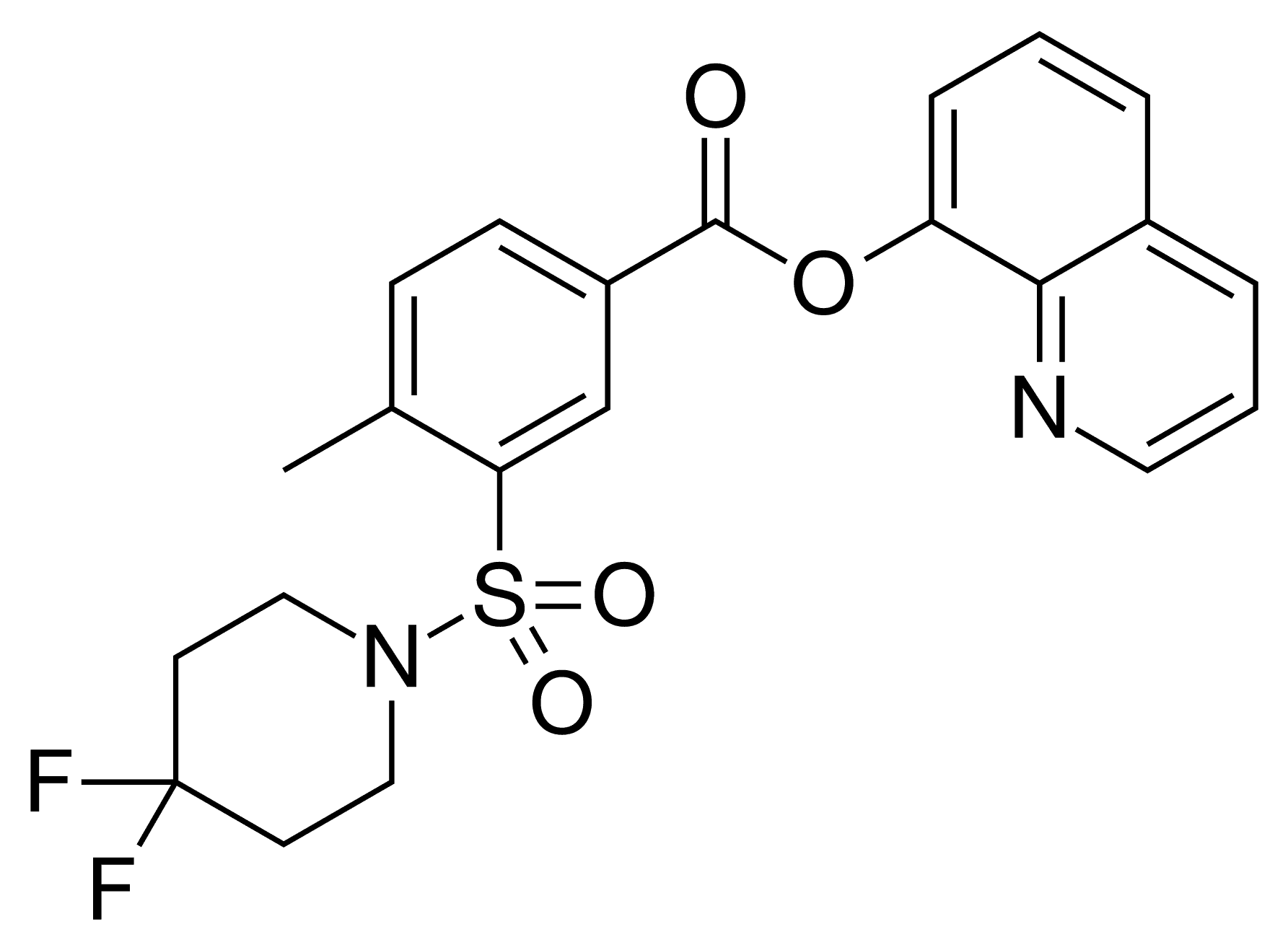

Legal status
- Legal status: CA: Schedule II; DE: NpSG (Industrial and scientific use only); UK: Under Psychoactive Substances Act

Identifiers
- IUPAC name: 8-quinolinyl 4-methyl-3-[(4,4-difluoropiperidin-1-yl)sulfonyl]benzoate
- CAS Number: 2707165-48-6
- PubChem CID: 155884739
- ChemSpider: 76714524
- UNII: F2QP2J5B2Z
- CompTox Dashboard (EPA): DTXSID301337095

Chemical and physical data
- Formula: C_{22}H_{20}F_{2}N_{2}O_{4}S
- Molar mass: 446.47 g·mol^{−1}
- 3D model (JSmol): Interactive image
- SMILES: FC1(F)CCN(CC1)S(=O)(=O)c2cc(ccc2C)C(=O)Oc4cccc3cccnc34
- InChI: InChI=1S/C22H20F2N2O4S/c1-15-7-8-17(14-19(15)31(28,29)26-12-9-22(23,24)10-13-26)21(27)30-18-6-2-4-16-5-3-11-25-20(16)18/h2-8,11,14H,9-10,12-13H2,1H3; Key:JOSWCKYCXJMLNM-UHFFFAOYSA-N

2F-QMPSB (SGT-13) is an arylsulfonamide-based synthetic cannabinoid that is a fluorinated derivative of QMPSB and has been sold as a designer drug. Its identification was first reported by a forensic laboratory in Italy in January 2019, and it was made illegal in Latvia shortly afterwards. Fluorination of the tail group is a common strategy to increase potency at cannabinoid receptors which is seen in many related series of compounds.

== See also ==
- A-PONASA
- AB-MDMSBA
- AZD1940
- FUB-PB-22
