= THJ-018 =

Chemical compound

Legal status
- Legal status: CA: Schedule II; DE: Anlage II (Authorized trade only, not prescriptible); UK: Class B

Identifiers
- IUPAC name: 1-Naphthalenyl(1-pentyl-1H-indazol-3-yl)-methanone
- CAS Number: 1364933-55-0
- PubChem CID: 124518671
- ChemSpider: 29341702
- UNII: B39WNG6743
- CompTox Dashboard (EPA): DTXSID901010031

Chemical and physical data
- Formula: C_{23}H_{22}N_{2}O
- Molar mass: 342.442 g·mol^{−1}
- 3D model (JSmol): Interactive image
- SMILES: O=C(C1=NN(CCCCC)C2=C1C=CC=C2)C3=C4C(C=CC=C4)=CC=C3
- InChI: InChI=1S/C23H22N2O/c1-2-3-8-16-25-21-15-7-6-13-20(21)22(24-25)23(26)19-14-9-11-17-10-4-5-12-18(17)19/h4-7,9-15H,2-3,8,16H2,1H3; Key:VAKGBPSFDNTMDJ-UHFFFAOYSA-N

THJ-018 (SGT-17) is a synthetic cannabinoid that is the indazole analogue of JWH-018 and has been sold online as a designer drug.

== Pharmacology ==
THJ-018 acts as a full agonist with a binding affinity of 5.84 nM at CB_{1} and 4.57 nM at CB_{2} cannabinoid receptors.

== Legality ==
THJ-018 is an Anlage II controlled drug in Germany. It is also banned in Sweden.

== See also ==
- AM-2201
- THJ-2201
- THQ-PINACA
