= AB-MDMSBA =

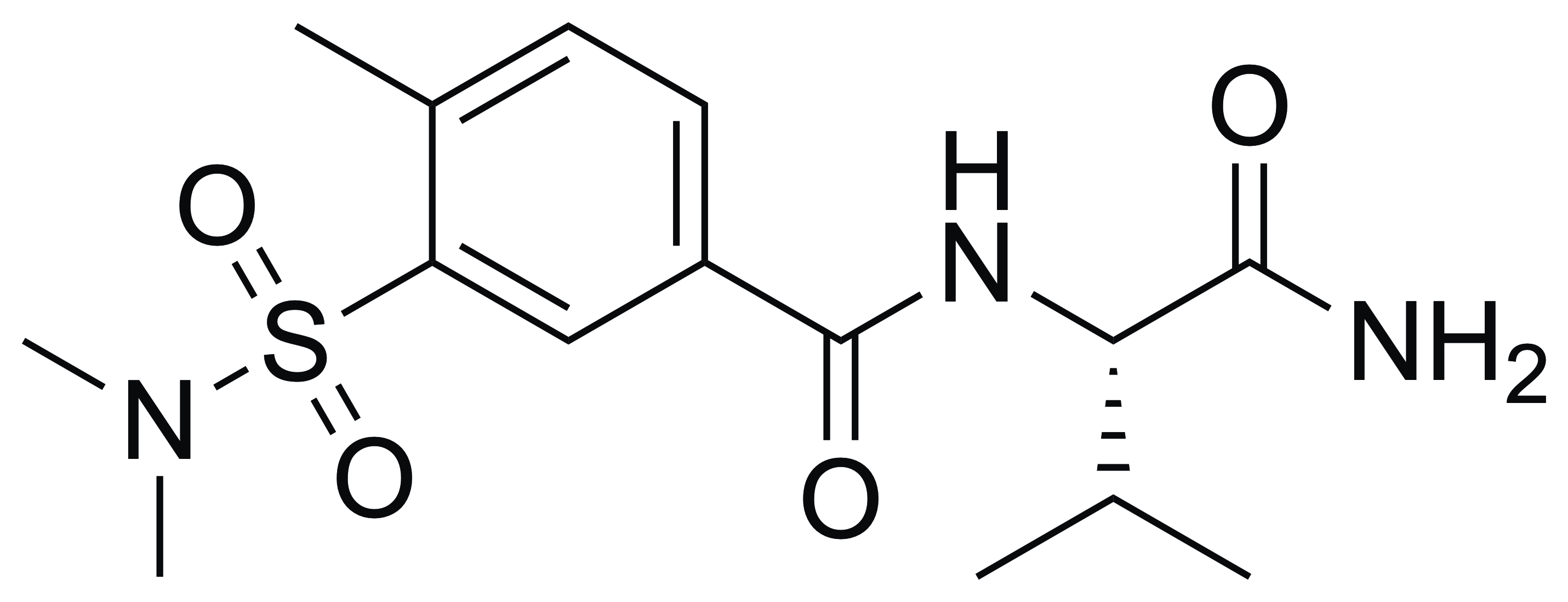

Legal status
- Legal status: AU: Unscheduled (No known pharmacological activity); DE: NpSG (Industrial and scientific use only)

Identifiers
- IUPAC name: N-[(2S)-1-amino-3-methyl-1-oxobutan-2-yl]-3-(dimethylsulfamoyl)-4-methylbenzamide
- PubChem CID: 172872001
- ChemSpider: 129395436

Chemical and physical data
- Formula: C_{15}H_{23}N_{3}O_{4}S
- Molar mass: 341.43 g·mol^{−1}
- 3D model (JSmol): Interactive image
- SMILES: CC1=C(C=C(C=C1)C(=O)N[C@@H](C(C)C)C(=O)N)S(=O)(=O)N(C)C
- InChI: InChI=InChI=1S/C15H23N3O4S/c1-9(2)13(14(16)19)17-15(20)11-7-6-10(3)12(8-11)23(21,22)18(4)5/h6-9,13H,1-5H3,(H2,16,19)(H,17,20)/t13-/m0/s1; Key:KYNAATZHNRULED-ZDUSSCGKSA-N

AB-MDMSBA is a novel synthetic compound that has been sold as a designer drug. It has been detected by drug checking services in Australia and New Zealand being misrepresented as a benzodiazepine.

It is structurally similar to other arylsulfonamide-based synthetic cannabinoids such as QMPSB. This class of synthetic cannabinoid has previously been targeted toward greater selectivity of the cannabinoid receptor CB_{2} over CB_{1}. However, AD-MDMSBA itself binds with very low affinity and is unlikely to cause receptor activation. It may serve as a pre-cursor to synthesize other cannabinoids.

== See also ==
- 2F-QMPSB
