= NM-2201 =

Chemical compound

Legal status
- Legal status: CA: Schedule II; DE: Anlage II (Authorized trade only, not prescriptible); UK: Class B; US: Schedule I; Illegal in Sweden

Identifiers
- IUPAC name: Naphthalen-1-yl 1-(5-fluoropentyl)-1H-indole-3-carboxylate
- CAS Number: 2042201-16-9
- PubChem CID: 91864534
- ChemSpider: 30922478
- UNII: CCQ6IR3CU2
- CompTox Dashboard (EPA): DTXSID201009986

Chemical and physical data
- Formula: C_{24}H_{22}FNO_{2}
- Molar mass: 375.443 g·mol^{−1}
- 3D model (JSmol): Interactive image
- SMILES: FCCCCCN1C=C(C(OC2=C(C=CC=C3)C3=CC=C2)=O)C4=CC=CC=C41
- InChI: InChI=1S/C24H22FNO2/c25-15-6-1-7-16-26-17-21(20-12-4-5-13-22(20)26)24(27)28-23-14-8-10-18-9-2-3-11-19(18)23/h2-5,8-14,17H,1,6-7,15-16H2; Key:PRGFSQYZCKCBQO-UHFFFAOYSA-N

NM-2201 (also known as CBL-2201 and NA-5F-PIC) is an indole-based synthetic cannabinoid that presumably has similar properties to the closely related 5F-PB-22 and NNE1, which are both full agonists and unselectively bind to CB_{1} and CB_{2} receptors with low nanomolar affinity.

== Pharmacology ==
NM-2201 acts as a full agonist with a binding affinity of 0.332 nM at CB_{1} and 0.732 nM at CB_{2} cannabinoid receptors. It has been linked to serious adverse events in users.

== Legal status ==
NM-2201 is specifically banned in Sweden, Germany (Anlage II), and Japan but is also controlled in many other jurisdictions under analogue laws.

On May 30, 2018 the United States Drug Enforcement Administration, Department of Justice published a notice of intent to place NM-2201 and 4 other synthetic cannabinoids in schedule I of the Controlled Substances Act. This notice went into effect on June 29, 2018.

== Use ==
NM-2201 was linked to an incident in December 2015 where 25-30 people in Ocala, FL were taken to hospitals after experiencing seizures.

== See also ==
- EAM-2201
- MAM-2201
- THJ-2201
- SDB-005
