= THJ-2201 =

Synthetic cannabinoid

Legal status
- Legal status: CA: Schedule II; DE: Anlage II (Authorized trade only, not prescriptible); UK: Class B; US: Schedule I

Identifiers
- IUPAC name: [1-(5-Fluoropentyl)-1H-indazol-3-yl](1-naphthyl)methanone
- CAS Number: 1801552-01-1
- PubChem CID: 91864533
- ChemSpider: 30646749
- UNII: D7P051IW0T
- CompTox Dashboard (EPA): DTXSID901010029

Chemical and physical data
- Formula: C_{23}H_{21}FN_{2}O
- Molar mass: 360.432 g·mol^{−1}
- 3D model (JSmol): Interactive image
- SMILES: c1ccc2c(c1)cccc2C(=O)c3c4ccccc4n(n3)CCCCCF
- InChI: InChI=1S/C23H21FN2O/c24-15-6-1-7-16-26-21-14-5-4-12-20(21)22(25-26)23(27)19-13-8-10-17-9-2-3-11-18(17)19/h2-5,8-14H,1,6-7,15-16H2; Key:DULWRYKFTVFPTL-UHFFFAOYSA-N

THJ-2201 is an indazole-based synthetic cannabinoid that presumably acts as a potent agonist of the CB_{1} receptor and has been sold online as a designer drug.

It is a structural analog of AM-2201 in which the central indole ring has been replaced by indazole.

== Pharmacology ==
THJ-2201 acts as a full agonist with a binding affinity of 1.34 nM at CB_{1} and 1.32 nM at CB_{2} cannabinoid receptors.

== Side effects ==
THJ-2201 has been linked to at least one hospitalization and death due to its use.

== Legal status ==
It is classified as a Schedule I controlled substance in the United States.

It is also an Anlage II controlled drug in Germany.

== See also ==
- AM-694
- AM-1235
- AM-2232
- AM-2233
- FUBIMINA
- JWH-018
- List of AM cannabinoids
- List of JWH cannabinoids
- NM-2201
- THJ-018
