= MDMB-FUBICA =

Chemical compound

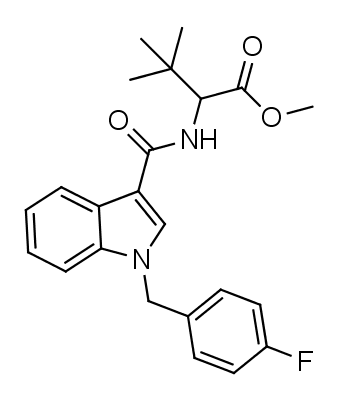

Legal status
- Legal status: CA: Schedule II; DE: NpSG (Industrial and scientific use only); UK: Class B; Illegal in Sweden

Identifiers
- IUPAC name: methyl (2S)-2-({1-[(4-fluorophenyl)methyl]-1H-indol-3-yl}formamido)-3,3-dimethylbutanoate
- CAS Number: 1971007-91-6
- PubChem CID: 129522107
- ChemSpider: 57621561
- UNII: K53ZMB4NR6

Chemical and physical data
- Formula: C_{23}H_{25}FN_{2}O_{3}
- Molar mass: 396.462 g·mol^{−1}
- 3D model (JSmol): Interactive image
- SMILES: COC(=O)[C@@H](NC(=O)c1cn(Cc2ccc(F)cc2)c3ccccc13)C(C)(C)C
- InChI: InChI=1S/C23H25FN2O3/c1-23(2,3)20(22(28)29-4)25-21(27)18-14-26(19-8-6-5-7-17(18)19)13-15-9-11-16(24)12-10-15/h5-12,14,20H,13H2,1-4H3,(H,25,27)/t20-/m1/s1; Key:RVAWIZIGOSKPBP-HXUWFJFHSA-N

MDMB-FUBICA is an indole-based synthetic cannabinoid that is presumed to be a potent agonist of the CB_{1} receptor and has been sold online as a designer drug.

It was first detected by the EMCDDA in Sweden in February 2015. It is often sold in e-liquid form for use in an electronic cigarette.

== Side effects ==
MDMB-FUBICA's indazole analogue MDMB-FUBINACA has been linked to at least 1000 hospitalisations and 40 deaths as a consequence of intoxication as of March 2015.

== Legality ==
MDMB-FUBICA is banned in Sweden.

== See also ==
- 5F-AB-PINACA
- 5F-ADB
- 5F-AMB
- 5F-APINACA
- AB-FUBINACA
- AB-CHFUPYCA
- AB-CHMINACA
- AB-PINACA
- ADB-CHMINACA
- ADB-FUBINACA
- ADB-PINACA
- AMB-FUBINACA
- APINACA
- APP-FUBINACA
- FUB-APINACA
- MDMB-CHMICA
- MDMB-CHMINACA
- PX-3
