= SDB-005 =

Chemical compound

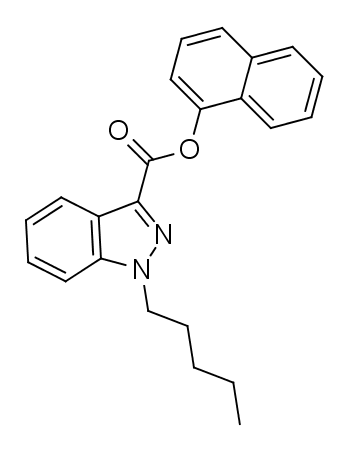

Legal status
- Legal status: CA: Schedule II; DE: NpSG (Industrial and scientific use only); UK: Class B

Identifiers
- IUPAC name: Naphthalen-1-yl 1-pentyl-1H-indazole-3-carboxylate
- CAS Number: 2180934-13-6
- PubChem CID: 125181303
- ChemSpider: 30922481
- UNII: Z6XWV5U765
- CompTox Dashboard (EPA): DTXSID601010032

Chemical and physical data
- Formula: C_{23}H_{22}N_{2}O_{2}
- Molar mass: 358.441 g·mol^{−1}
- 3D model (JSmol): Interactive image
- SMILES: CCCCCN1N=C(C(=O)OC2=CC=CC3=C2C=CC=C3)C2=C1C=CC=C2
- InChI: InChI=1S/C23H22N2O2/c1-2-3-8-16-25-20-14-7-6-13-19(20)22(24-25)23(26)27-21-15-9-11-17-10-4-5-12-18(17)21/h4-7,9-15H,2-3,8,16H2,1H3; Key:JBVNFKZVDLFOAY-UHFFFAOYSA-N

SDB-005 (also known as NA-PINAC using systematic EUDA nomenclature) is an indazole-based synthetic cannabinoid that has been sold online as a designer drug. It is presumed to be an agonist of the CB_{1} and CB_{2} cannabinoid receptors. SDB-005 is the indazole core analog of PB-22 where the 8-hydroxyquinoline has also been replaced with a naphthalene group.

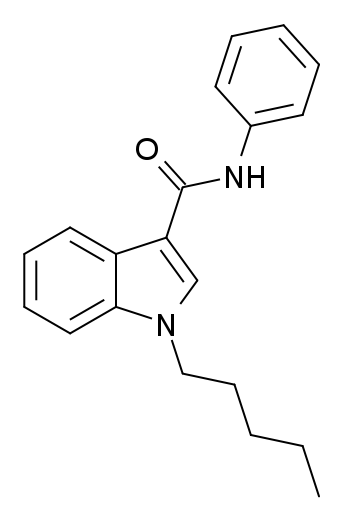
Structure of Phen-1-yl 1-pentyl-1H-indole-3-carboxamide (PH-PICA)

The code number SDB-005 was originally used by Samuel D. Bannister for a different compound, the N-phenyl instead of N-benzyl analogue of SDB-006, pictured. It is systematically named PH-PICA (Phen-1-yl 1-Pentyl-1H-indazole-3-carboxamide. This compound is a potent agonist of the CB_{1} receptor (K_{i} = 21 nM) and CB_{2} receptor (K_{i} = 140 nM) but has significant chemical differences; an indazole ring (instead of indole ring), a carboxamide linker (instead of carboxylate ester) and linked phenyl (instead of naphtyl) group).

However, SDB-005 was subsequently used as the name for the indazole-3-napthyl-carboxylate compound when it was sold in Europe as a designer drug. Because of this, it was entered into the EMCDDA synthetic drug database under this name. The UK Forensic Early Warning System reported a detection of SDB-005 in December 2017 as the first occurrence of naphthalen-1-yl-1-pentyl-1H-indazole-3-carboxylate (NA-PINAC) in the UK. Many online sources now list SDB-005 as naphthalen-1-yl 1-pentyl-1H-indazole-3-carboxylate (NA-PINAC).

Consequently, there are now two distinct, yet fairly closely related cannabinoid compounds, which may both be referred to under the code SDB-005.

== See also ==
- 5F-PB-22
- AM-2201
- BB-22
- JWH-018
- NM-2201
- NNE1
