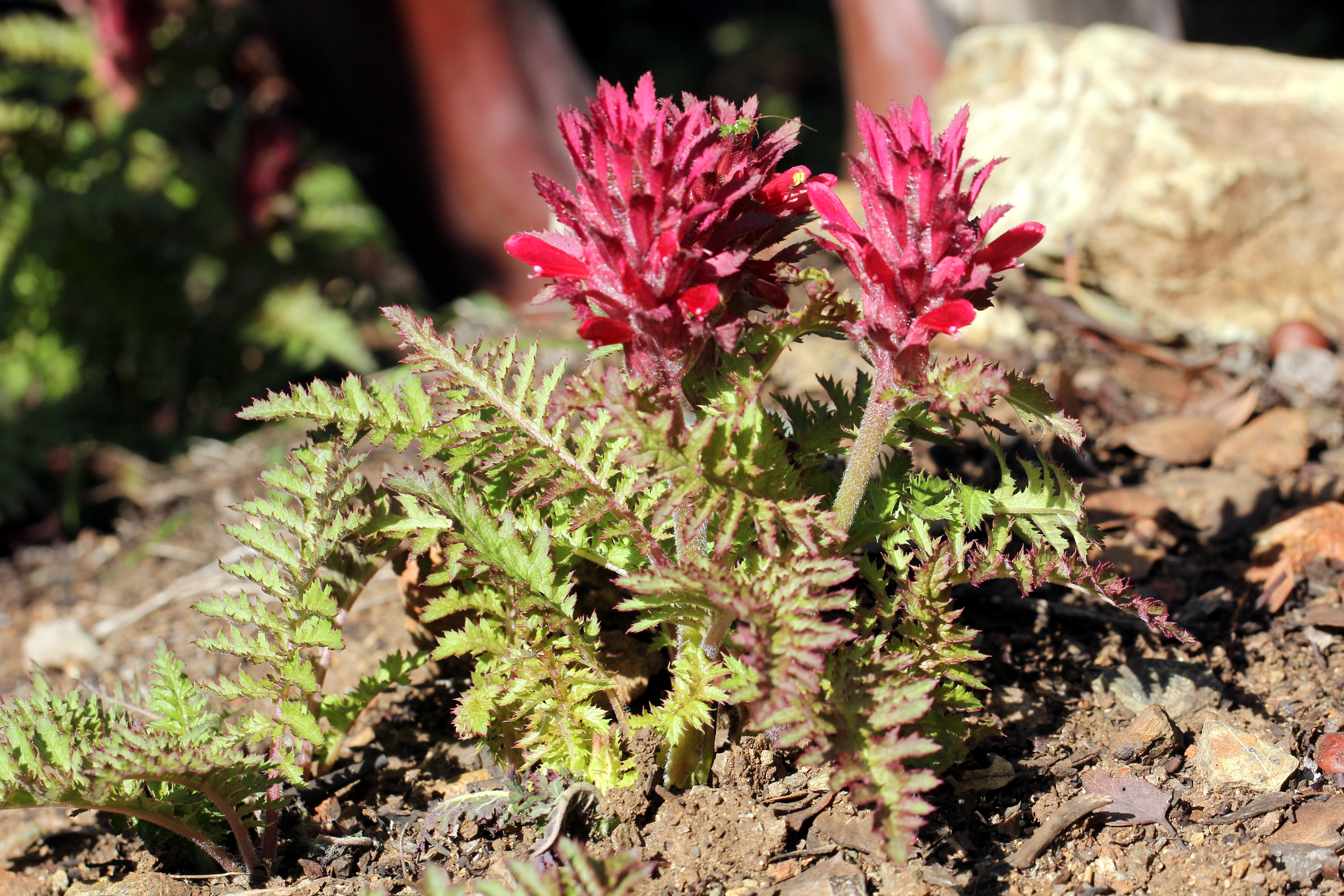

Scientific classification
- Kingdom: Plantae
- Clade: Tracheophytes
- Clade: Angiosperms
- Clade: Eudicots
- Clade: Asterids
- Order: Lamiales
- Family: Orobanchaceae
- Genus: Pedicularis
- Species: P. densiflora

Binomial name
- Pedicularis densiflora Benth. ex Hook.

= Pedicularis densiflora =

Species of flowering plant

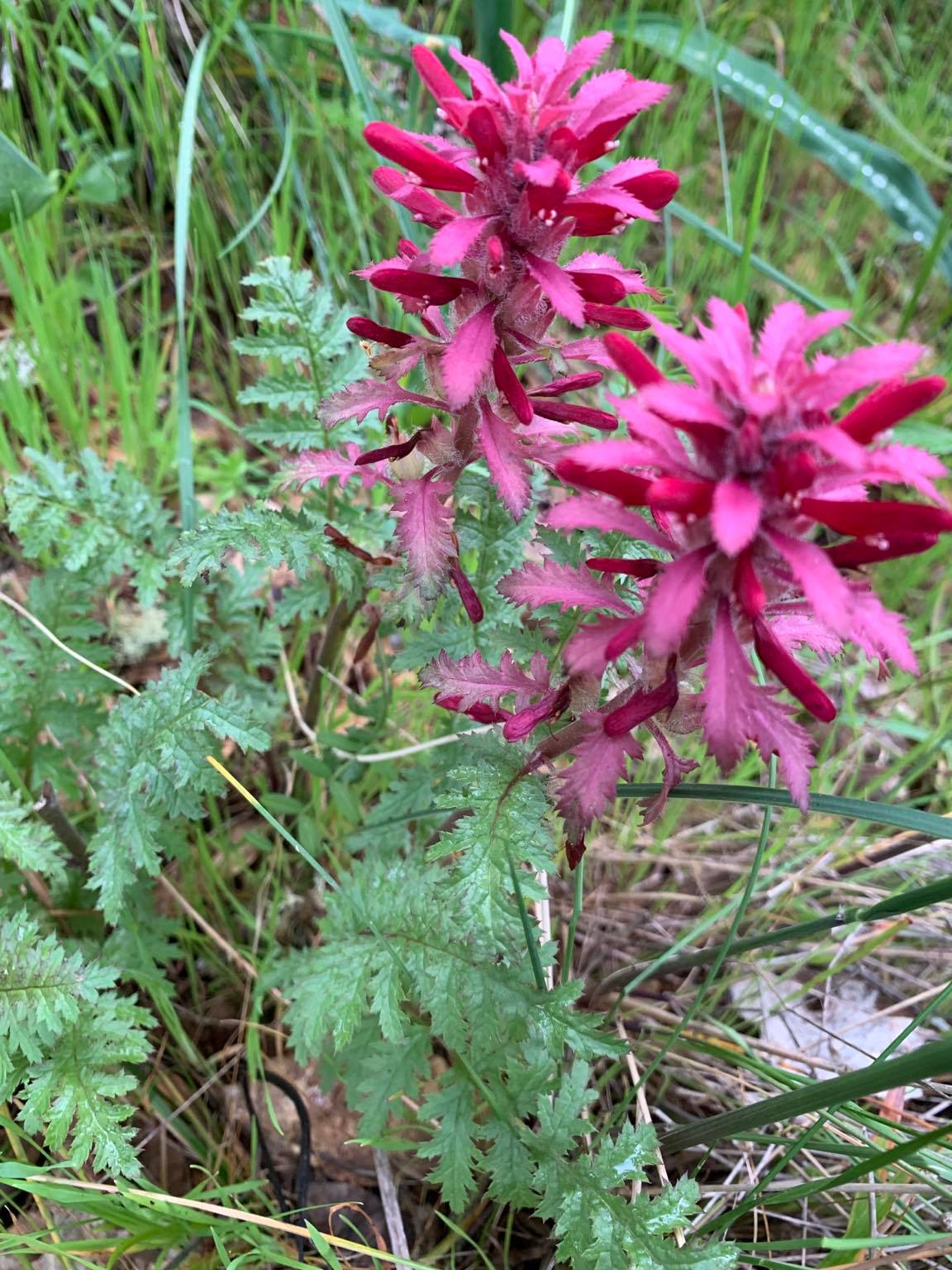
Indian Warrior, Phoenix Lake, Ross, California, spring 2022

Pedicularis densiflora, known commonly as Indian warrior or warrior's-plume lousewort, is a plant in the family Orobanchaceae.

Indian warrior is native to California and Oregon in western North America and is found in chaparral, forests, California oak woodlands at low elevations.

== Description ==
Pedicularis densiflora is a perennial herb with stout, green or sometimes reddish or magenta stems and fern-shaped leaves, and long spikes of deep red to bright pink flowers with toothed petals.

Like other louseworts, it is a root parasitic plant, attaching to the roots of other plants to obtain nutrients and water. This species is a facultative parasite, or hemiparasite, in that it can live without attaching to another plant but will parasitize if presented with the opportunity. It often parasitizes plants of the heath family, such as manzanita.

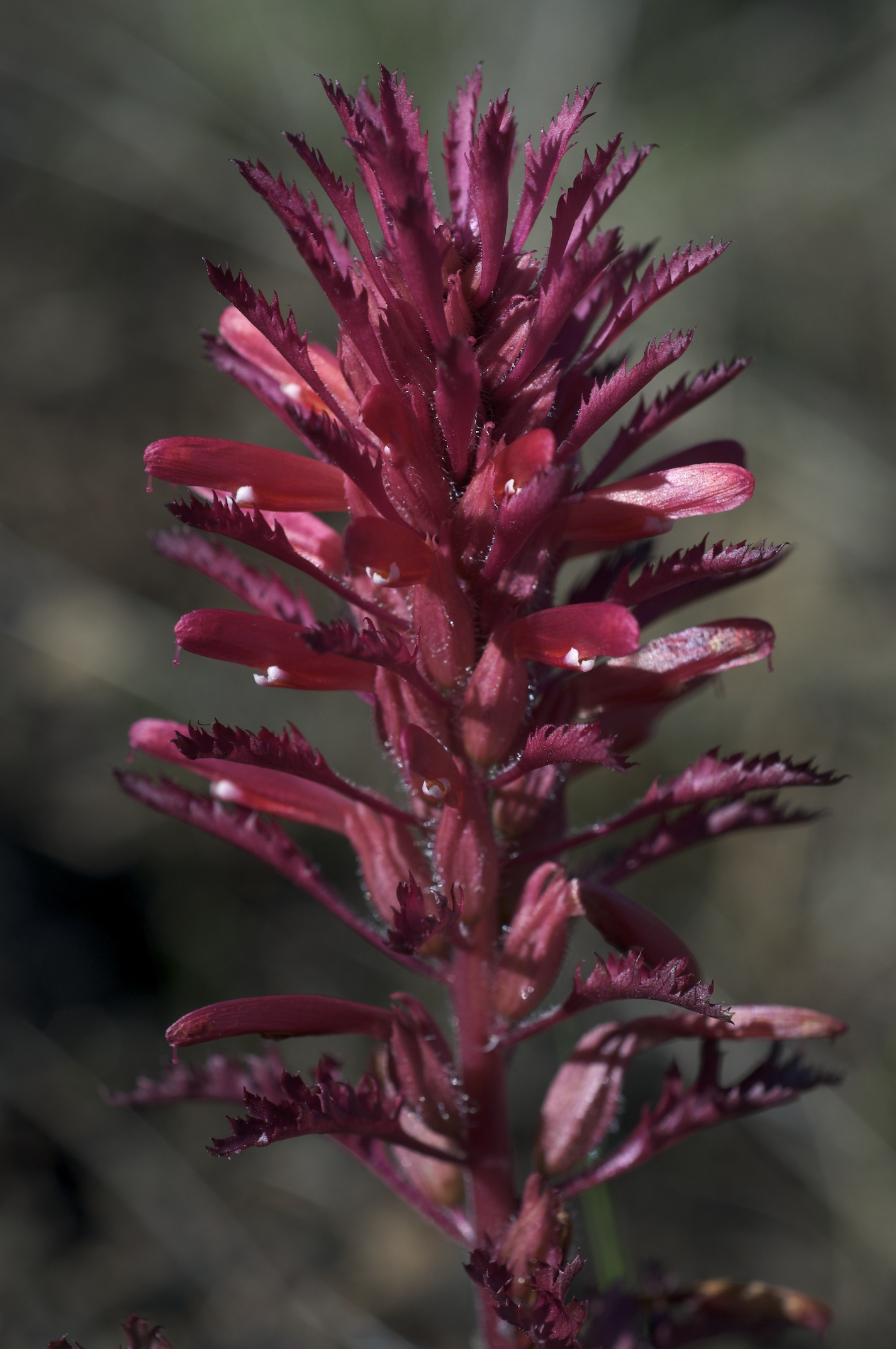
Pedicularis densiflora flower
