= FUB-144 =

Chemical compound

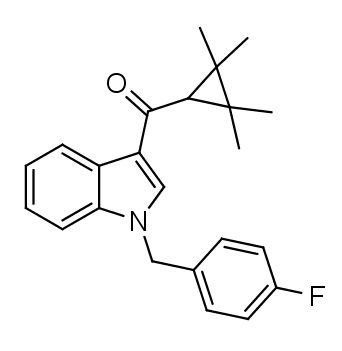

Legal status
- Legal status: CA: Schedule II; DE: NpSG (Industrial and scientific use only); UK: Class B; US: Schedule I

Identifiers
- IUPAC name: [1-(4-Fluorobenzyl)-1H-indol-3-yl](2,2,3,3-tetramethylcyclopropyl)methanone
- CAS Number: 2185863-15-2
- PubChem CID: 118796439
- ChemSpider: 30646792
- UNII: IWY4W66OKW
- CompTox Dashboard (EPA): DTXSID201016907

Chemical and physical data
- Formula: C_{23}H_{24}FNO
- Molar mass: 349.449 g·mol^{−1}
- 3D model (JSmol): Interactive image
- SMILES: Fc1ccc(cc1)Cn1cc(c2c1cccc2)C(=O)C1C(C1(C)C)(C)C
- InChI: InChI=1S/C23H24FNO/c1-22(2)21(23(22,3)4)20(26)18-14-25(19-8-6-5-7-17(18)19)13-15-9-11-16(24)12-10-15/h5-12,14,21H,13H2,1-4H3; Key:UXOFEILQVZFLRH-UHFFFAOYSA-N

FUB-144 (also known as FUB-UR-144) is an indole-based synthetic cannabinoid that is presumed to be a potent agonist of the CB_{1} receptor and has been sold online as a designer drug. It is an analogue of UR-144 and XLR-11 where the pentyl chain has been replaced with fluorobenzyl.

== Legal status ==
In the United States, FUB-144 was temporarily emergency scheduled by the DEA in 2019. and made a permanent Schedule I Controlled Substance on April 7, 2022.

Sweden's public health agency suggested classifying FUB-144 as hazardous substance on March 24, 2015.

== See also ==
- A-834,735
- AB-005
- FAB-144
- JWH-018
- STS-135
