= JWH-302 =

Chemical compound

Legal status
- Legal status: US: Schedule I

Identifiers
- IUPAC name: 2-(3-Methoxyphenyl)-1-(1-pentylindol-3-yl)ethanone
- CAS Number: 864445-45-4
- PubChem CID: 11493740
- ChemSpider: 9668546
- UNII: DQF20NHW2M
- ChEMBL: ChEMBL186674
- CompTox Dashboard (EPA): DTXSID60467554

Chemical and physical data
- Formula: C_{22}H_{25}NO_{2}
- Molar mass: 335.447 g·mol^{−1}
- 3D model (JSmol): Interactive image
- SMILES: c2ccc(OC)cc2CC(=O)c(cn1CCCCC)c3ccccc13
- InChI: InChI=1S/C22H25NO2/c1-3-4-7-13-23-16-20(19-11-5-6-12-21(19)23)22(24)15-17-9-8-10-18(14-17)25-2/h5-6,8-12,14,16H,3-4,7,13,15H2,1-2H3; Key:XZVYWLVYUAQEIM-UHFFFAOYSA-N

JWH-302 (1-pentyl-3-(3-methoxyphenylacetyl)indole) is an analgesic chemical from the phenylacetylindole family, which acts as a cannabinoid agonist with moderate affinity at both the CB_{1} and CB_{2} receptors. It is a positional isomer of the more common drug JWH-250, though it is slightly less potent with a K_{i} of 17 nM at CB_{1}, compared to 11 nM for JWH-250. Because of their identical molecular weight and similar fragmentation patterns, JWH-302 and JWH-250 can be very difficult to distinguish by GC-MS testing.

In the United States, CB_{1} receptor agonists of the 3-phenylacetylindole class such as JWH-302 are Schedule I Controlled Substances.
