= QUCHMIC =

Chemical compound

Clinical data
- Other names: BB-22; SGT-32; quinolin-8-yl 1-cyclohexylmethyl-1H-indole-3-8-carboxylate

Legal status
- Legal status: CA: Schedule II; DE: Anlage II (Authorized trade only, not prescriptible); NZ: Temporary Class; UK: Class B

Identifiers
- IUPAC name: 1-(cyclohexylmethyl)-1H-indole-3-carboxylic acid 8-quinolinyl ester
- CAS Number: 1400742-42-8
- PubChem CID: 71711120
- ChemSpider: 29339967
- UNII: EUD4ZLB25R
- CompTox Dashboard (EPA): DTXSID40856801

Chemical and physical data
- Formula: C_{25}H_{24}N_{2}O_{2}
- Molar mass: 384.479 g·mol^{−1}
- 3D model (JSmol): Interactive image
- SMILES: C1CCC(CC1)CN2C=C(C3=CC=CC=C32)C(=O)OC4=CC=CC5=C4N=CC=C5
- InChI: InChI=1S/C25H24N2O2/c28-25(29-23-14-6-10-19-11-7-15-26-24(19)23)21-17-27(16-18-8-2-1-3-9-18)22-13-5-4-12-20(21)22/h4-7,10-15,17-18H,1-3,8-9,16H2; Key:RHYGTJXOHOGQGI-UHFFFAOYSA-N

QUCHMIC (named using EMCDDA naming standards, but regularly mis-named QUCHIC (Note: The compound QUCHIC (quinolin-8-yl 1-cyclohexyl-1H-indole-3-8-carboxylate) has never been detected)), also known as BB-22, SGT-32, or quinolin-8-yl 1-cyclohexylmethyl-1H-indole-3-8-carboxylate, is a designer drug offered by online vendors as a cannabimimetic agent, and was first detected being sold in synthetic cannabis products in Japan in early 2013, and subsequently also in New Zealand.

The structure of QUCHMIC appears to use an understanding of structure-activity relationships within the indole class of cannabimimetics, although its design origins are unclear. QUCHMIC, along with QUPIC, QUFUBIC, 2F-QMPSB and NA-PINAC, represent a structurally unusual synthetic cannabinoid chemotype since they contain an ester linker at the indole 3-position rather than the precedented ketone of JWH-018 and its analogues, or the amide of SDB-001 and its analogues.

== Pharmacology ==
QUCHMIC acts as a full agonist with a binding affinity of 0.217 nM at CB_{1} and 0.338 nM at CB_{2} cannabinoid receptors.

== See also ==
- 5F-PB-22
- JWH-018
- PB-22
- QUPIC
- QUFUBIC
- SDB-001
- SDB-005
- 2F-QMPSB
