= RCS-4 =

Chemical compound

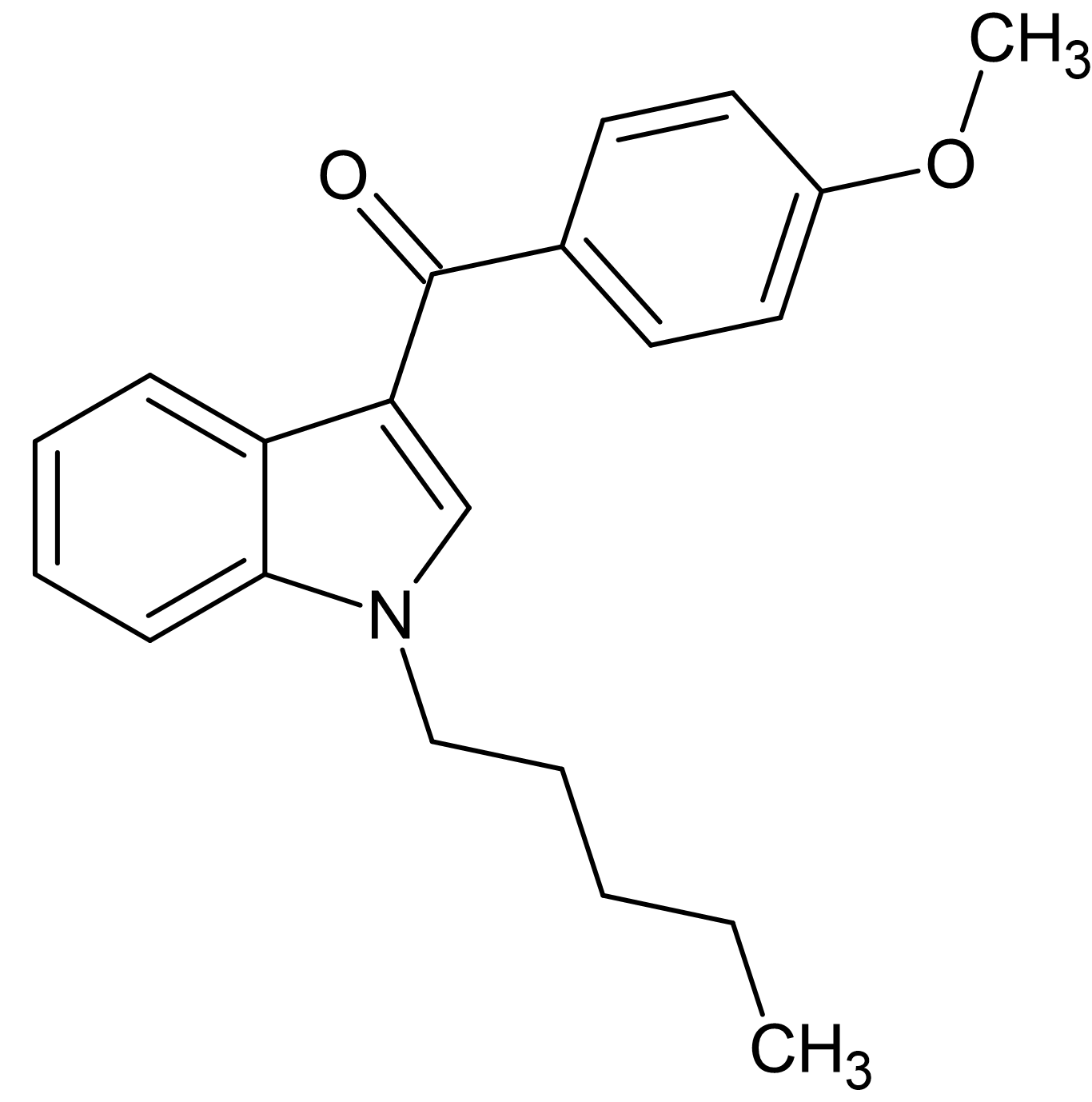

Legal status
- Legal status: CA: Schedule II; DE: Anlage II (Authorized trade only, not prescriptible); UK: Class B; US: Schedule I; Illegal in Sweden, I-N (Poland)

Identifiers
- IUPAC name: 2-(4-methoxyphenyl)-1-(1-pentyl-indol-3-yl)methanone
- CAS Number: 1345966-78-0
- ChemSpider: 24769418
- UNII: Y6911BZ2UL
- CompTox Dashboard (EPA): DTXSID70158820
- ECHA InfoCard: 100.233.383

Chemical and physical data
- Formula: C_{21}H_{23}NO_{2}
- Molar mass: 321.420 g·mol^{−1}
- 3D model (JSmol): Interactive image
- SMILES: CCCCCn1cc(c2c1cccc2)C(=O)c3ccc(cc3)OC
- InChI: InChI=1S/C21H23NO2/c1-3-4-7-14-22-15-19(18-8-5-6-9-20(18)22)21(23)16-10-12-17(24-2)13-11-16/h5-6,8-13,15H,3-4,7,14H2,1-2H3; Key:OZCYJKDWRUIFFE-UHFFFAOYSA-N

RCS-4, or 1-pentyl-3-(4-methoxybenzoyl)indole, is a synthetic cannabinoid drug sold under the names SR-19, BTM-4, or Eric-4 (later shortened to E-4), but originally, OBT-199.

== Pharmacology ==
RCS-4 is a potent cannabinoid receptor agonist, with EC_{50} values of 146 nM for human CB_{1} receptors, and 46 nM for human CB_{2} receptors. All methoxyphenyl regioisomers, and N-butyl homologues of RCS-4 and its regioisomers also display potent agonist activities at CB_{1} and CB_{2} receptors.

== Legality ==
RCS-4 was banned in Sweden on 1 October 2010 as a hazardous good harmful to health, after being identified as an ingredient in "herbal" synthetic cannabis products.

It was outlawed in Denmark on 11 March 2011.

In August 2011, New Zealand added not only RCS-4 but also its 1-butyl homologue, and the 2-methoxybenzoyl isomers of both these compounds, to a temporary class drug schedule (i.e. equivalent to Class C but reviewed after 12 months, and with personal possession and use of small amounts decriminalised), which was newly created under the Misuse of Drugs Amendment Act 2011 passed a week earlier.

As of October 2015 RCS-4 is a controlled substance in China.

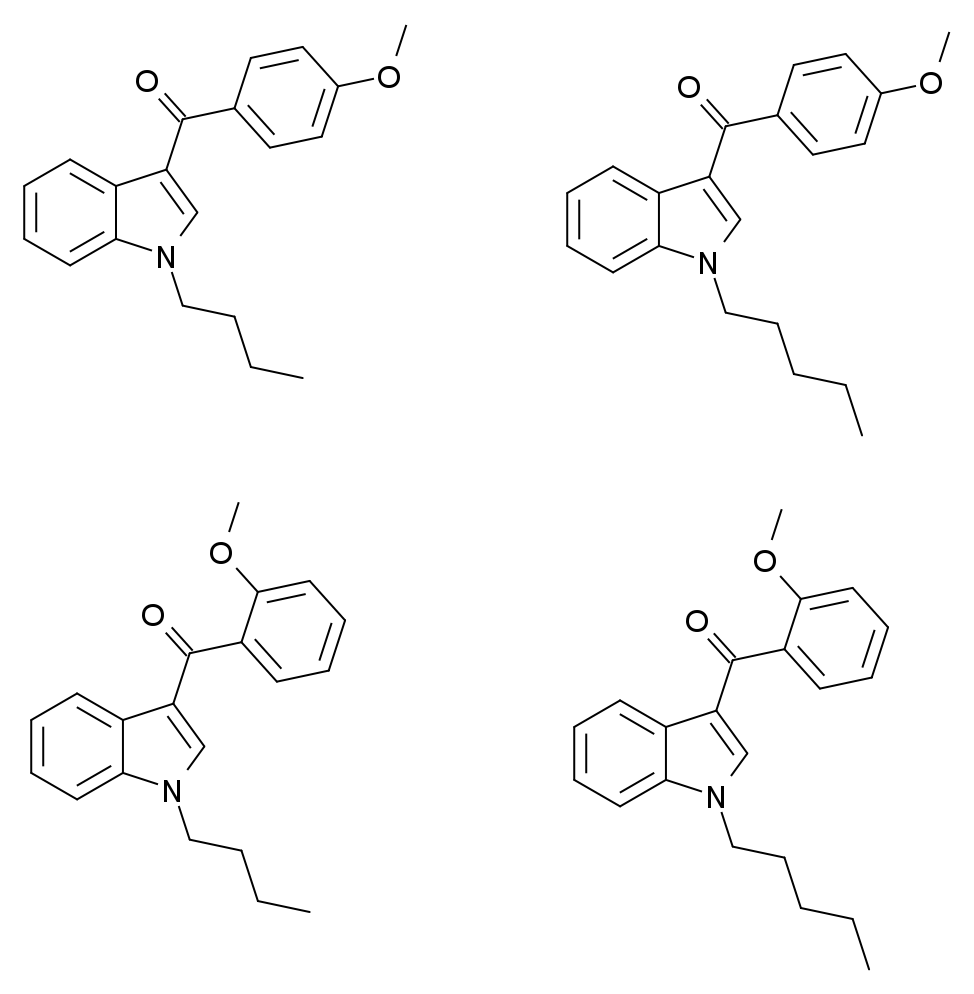
RCS-4 and related analogues detected in synthetic cannabis blends

== See also ==
- AM-630
- AM-679
- RCS-8
- Pravadoline (WIN 48,098)
- Structural scheduling of synthetic cannabinoids
