= JWH-018 =

Chemical compound

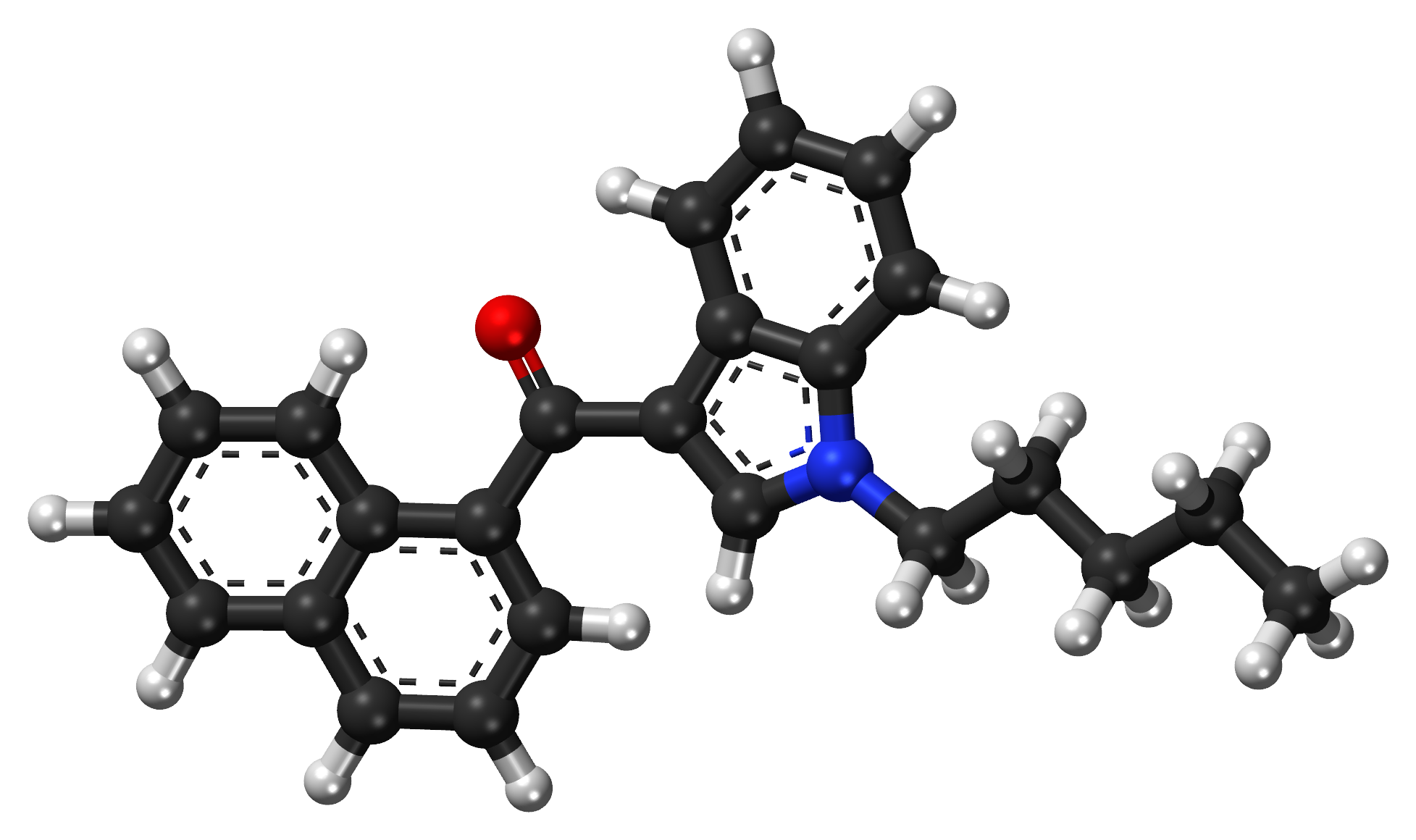

Clinical data
- Other names: 1-Pentyl-3-(1-naphthoyl)indole; NA-PIMO; AM-678; AM678
- Routes of administration: Oral, inhalation
- Drug class: Cannabinoid; Cannabinoid CB_{1} and CB_{2} receptor agonist; Hallucinogen; Analgesic
- ATC code: None

Legal status
- Legal status: AU: S9 (Prohibited substance); BR: Class F2 (Prohibited psychotropics); CA: Schedule II, In general uncontrolled could be illegal to sell for human consumption or the analogue acts in several countries.; DE: Anlage II (Authorized trade only, not prescriptible); UK: Class B; US: Schedule I; UN: Psychotropic Schedule II

Pharmacokinetic data
- Elimination half-life: Inhalation: 1.69 hours

Identifiers
- IUPAC name: (naphthalen-1-yl)(1-pentyl-1H-indol-3-yl)methanone
- CAS Number: 209414-07-3
- PubChem CID: 10382701
- ChemSpider: 8558143
- UNII: G391998J57
- KEGG: C22748
- ChEMBL: ChEMBL561013
- CompTox Dashboard (EPA): DTXSID10175117
- ECHA InfoCard: 100.163.574

Chemical and physical data
- Formula: C_{24}H_{23}NO
- Molar mass: 341.454 g·mol^{−1}
- 3D model (JSmol): Interactive image
- Solubility in water: Hydrophobic, n/a mg/mL (20 °C)
- SMILES: CCCCCN1C=C(C(C2=CC=CC3=CC=CC=C32)=O)C4=CC=CC=C41
- InChI: InChI=1S/C24H23NO/c1-2-3-8-16-25-17-22(20-13-6-7-15-23(20)25)24(26)21-14-9-11-18-10-4-5-12-19(18)21/h4-7,9-15,17H,2-3,8,16H2,1H3; Key:JDNLPKCAXICMBW-UHFFFAOYSA-N

JWH-018, also known as 1-pentyl-3-(1-naphthoyl)indole, NA-PIMO, or AM-678, is a cannabinoid from the naphthoylindole family that acts as a full agonist at both the CB_{1} and CB_{2} cannabinoid receptors, with some selectivity for CB_{2}. It produces effects in animals similar to those of tetrahydrocannabinol (THC), a cannabinoid naturally present in cannabis, leading to its use as synthetic cannabinoid products that, in some countries, are sold legally as "incense blends".

As a full agonist at both the CB_{1} and CB_{2} cannabinoid receptors, this chemical compound is classified as an analgesic medication. The analgesic effects of cannabinoid ligands, mediated by CB_{1} receptors are well established in treatment of neuropathic pain, as well as cancer pain and arthritis.

These compounds work by mimicking the body's naturally-produced endocannabinoid hormones such as 2-AG and anandamide (AEA), which are biologically active and can exacerbate or inhibit nerve signaling. As the cause is poorly understood in chronic pain states, more research and development must be done before the therapeutic potential of this class of biologic compounds can be realized.

== Use and effects ==
JWH-018 has been reported to produce marked impairment and intense hallucinogenic effects even in small to moderate doses in clinical studies.

== Adverse effects ==
Compared to THC, which is a partial agonist at CB_{1} receptors, JWH-018, and many synthetic cannabinoids, are full agonists. JWH-018 may cause intense anxiety, agitation, and in rare cases, has been assumed to have been the cause of seizures and convulsions. JWH-018 and analogs of it may present serious dangers to the user when used to excess.

Various physical and psychological adverse effects have been reported from JWH-018 use. One study reported psychotic relapses and anxiety symptoms in well-treated patients with mental illness following JWH-018 inhalation. Due to concerns about the potential of JWH-018 and other synthetic cannabinoids to cause psychosis in vulnerable individuals, it has been recommended that people with risk factors for psychotic disorders, such as a past or family history of psychosis, not use these substances.

At least one case of JWH-018 dependence has been reported by the media. The user consumed JWH-018 daily for eight months. Withdrawal symptoms were more severe than those experienced as a result of cannabis dependence. JWH-018 has been shown to cause profound changes in CB_{1} receptor density following administration, causing desensitization to its effects more rapidly than related cannabinoids.

On 15 October 2011, Anderson County coroner Greg Shore attributed the death of a South Carolina college basketball player to "drug toxicity and organ failure" caused by JWH-018. A November 2011 email concerning the case was released in December 2011 under the Freedom of Information Act after multiple requests to see the information had been denied.

== Pharmacology ==
=== Pharmacodynamics ===
JWH-018 is a full agonist of both the CB_{1} and CB_{2} cannabinoid receptors, with a reported binding affinity of 9.00 ± 5.00 nM at CB_{1} and 2.94 ± 2.65 nM at CB_{2}. JWH-018 has an EC_{50} of 102 nM for human CB_{1} receptors, and 133 nM for human CB_{2} receptors. JWH-018 produces bradycardia and hypothermia in rats at doses of 0.3–3 mg/kg, suggesting potent cannabinoid-like activity. As it is CB_{1} agonist, it can indirectly release dopamine in cortical areas of the frontal brain. JWH-018 can induce dopaminergic and hypnotic states.

=== Pharmacokinetics ===
Metabolism of JWH-018 was assessed using Wistar rats which had been administered an ethanolic extract containing JWH-018. Urine was collected for 24 hours, followed by extraction of JWH-018 metabolites using both liquid-liquid extraction and solid-phase extraction. GC-MS was utilized to separate and identify the extracted compounds. JWH-018 and its N-dealkylated metabolite were only detected in small amounts, with hydroxylated N-dealkylated metabolites comprising the primary signal. The observed mass shift indicates that it is likely that hydroxylation occurs in both the naphthalene and indole portions of the molecule. Human metabolites were similar although most metabolism took place on the indole ring and pentyl side chain, and the hydroxylated metabolites were extensively conjugated with glucuronide. When inhaled, the median half-life of JWH-018 is 1.69 hours.

== Chemistry ==
=== Detection in biological fluids ===
JWH-018 usage is readily detected in urine using "spice" screening immunoassays from several manufacturers focused on both the parent drug and its omega-hydroxy and carboxyl metabolites. JWH-018 will not be detected by older methods employed for detecting THC and other cannabis terpenoids. Determination of the parent drug in serum or its metabolites in urine has been accomplished by GC-MS or LC-MS. Serum JWH-018 concentrations are generally in the 1–10 μg/L range during the first few hours after recreational usage. The major urinary metabolite is a compound that is monohydroxylated on the omega minus one carbon atom of the alkyl side chain. A lesser metabolite monohydroxylated on the omega (terminal) position was present in the urine of six users of the drug at concentrations of 6–50 μg/L, primarily as a glucuronide conjugate.

== History ==
John W. Huffman, an organic chemist at Clemson University, synthesized a variety of chemical compounds that affect the endocannabinoid system. JWH-018 is one of these compounds, with studies showing an affinity for the cannabinoid CB_{1} receptor five times greater than that of THC.

On 15 December 2008, it was reported by German pharmaceutical companies that JWH-018 was found as one of the active components in at least three versions of the grey market drug Spice, which has been sold as an incense in a number of countries around the world since 2006. An analysis of samples acquired four weeks after the German prohibition of JWH-018 took place found that the manufacturers had shortened the alkyl chain by one carbon to circumvent the ban.

== Society and culture ==
=== Legal status ===
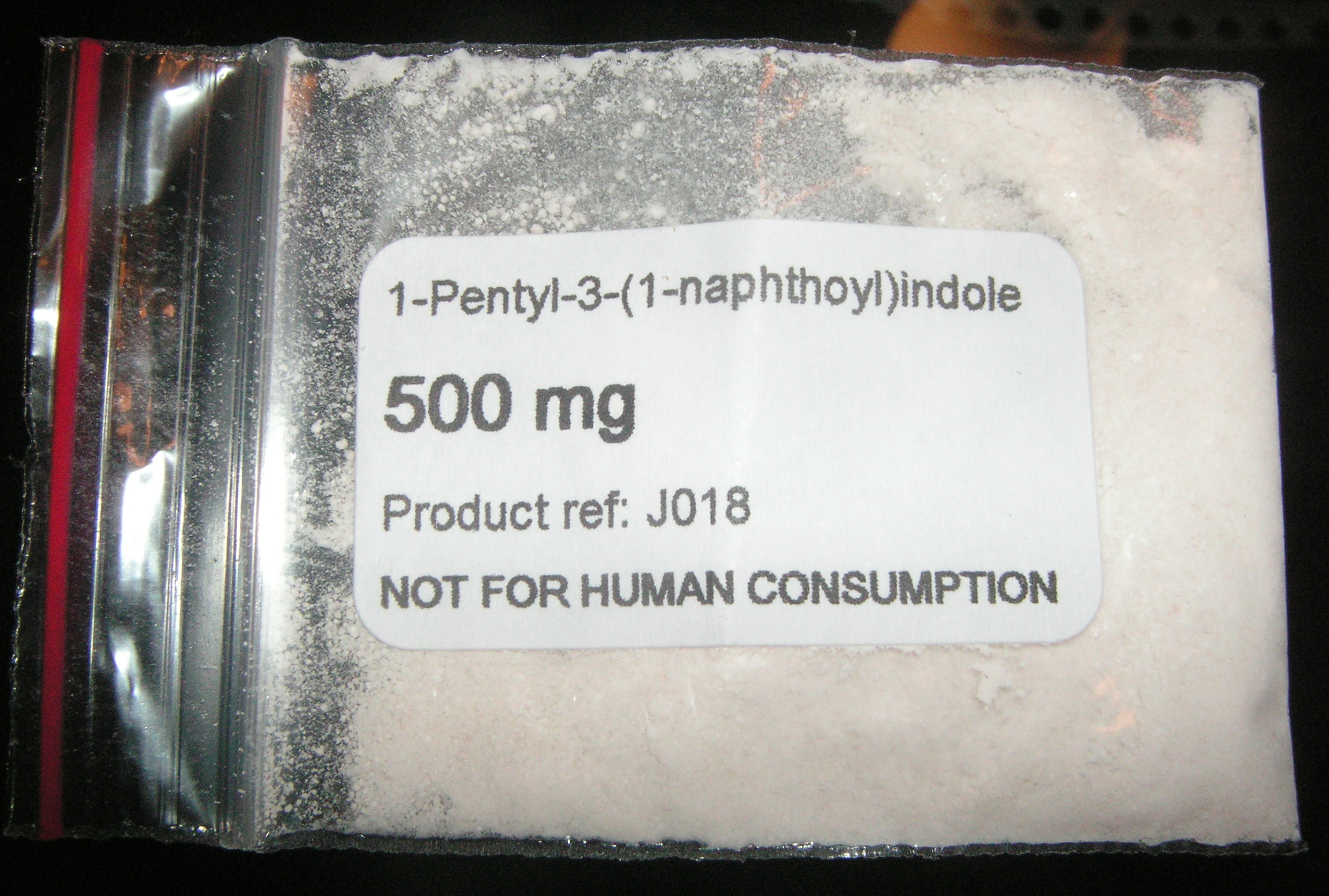
JWH-018 powder as it was commonly sold online

Country	Date of ban	Notes
Austria	18 December 2008	The Austrian Ministry of Health announced on 18 December 2008 that Spice would be controlled under Paragraph 78 of their drug law on the grounds that it contains an active substance that affects the functions of the body, and the legality of JWH-018 is under review.
Australia	9 September 2011	JWH-018 is considered a Schedule 9 prohibited substance in Australia under the Poisons Standard (October 2015). A Schedule 9 substance is a substance which may be abused or misused, the manufacture, possession, sale or use of which should be prohibited by law except when required for medical or scientific research, or for analytical, teaching or training purposes with approval of Commonwealth and/or State or Territory Health Authorities.
Belarus	1 January 2010	
Canada	21 February 2012	Despite the Canadian federal government having officially legalized the recreational use of cannabis on October 17, 2018 (see Cannabis Act), substances such as JWH-018 and JWH-073 are both on the most recently amended Schedule II of the Controlled Drugs and Substances Act.
China	1 January 2012	China has made JWH-018 Illegal for sale. It is illegal to import or export JWH-018.
Estonia	24 July 2009	
Finland	12 March 2012	Illegal
France	24 February 2009	
Germany	22 January 2009	
Ireland	11 May 2010	An immediate ban was announced on 11 May 2010 by Minister for Health Mary Harney.
Italy	2 July 2010	
Japan	3 August 2012	
Jordan	2 September 2014	The Anti-narcotics department declared synthetic cannabinoids and their analogues illegal after an outbreak of JWH-018 containing product referred to as "Joker".
Latvia	28 November 2009	
New Zealand	8 May 2014	
Norway	21 December 2011	
Poland	8 May 2009	
Romania	15 February 2010	
Russia	22 January 2010	
South Korea	1 July 2009	
Sweden	30 July 2009	A bill to ban JWH-018 was accepted on 30 July 2009 and was in effect on 15 September 2009.
Turkey	13 February 2011	Turkish authorities were first informed about JWH-018 through the European Monitoring Centre for Drugs and Drug Addiction (EMCDDA). The seizure of 2C-B in blue pill form on 13 October 2010 and the seizure of 0.6 g JWH-018 on 16 April 2010 in Eskisehir was reported through the Early Warning System (EWS). Upon these reports the EWS committee initiated the regulation process by warning the Ministry of Health. In response to the official letter #86106 issued by the Ministry of Health dated 22 December 2010, the Council of Ministers decided on 7 January 2011 to add 14 cannabinoids; namely JWH-018, CP 47,497, JWH-073, HU-210, JWH-200, JWH-250, JWH-398, JWH-081, JWH-073, JWH-015, JWH-122, JWH-203, JWH-210, JWH-019; phenethylamines 2C-B and 2C-P as well as Catha edulis to the list of substances subject to the Law on Control of Narcotic Drugs. The regulation is in effect since 13 February 2011. Upon letter #12099 issued by the Ministry of Health dated 6 February 2012, 4 more cannabinoids (AM-2201, RCS-4, JWH-201 and JWH-302), Salvia divinorum and several other chemicals (complete list here) were added to the list of controlled substances on 17 February 2012 which is effective since 22 March 2012.
Ukraine	31 May 2010	
United Kingdom	23 December 2009	
United States	1 March 2011	JWH-018 was temporarily scheduled on 1 March 2011 by 76 FR 11075. It was permanently scheduled on 9 July 2012 by Section 1152 of the Food and Drug Administration Safety and Innovation Act (FDASIA)

== Synthesis ==
Synthesis of JWH-018.

== See also ==
- Synthetic cannabinoids
- List of JWH cannabinoids
- AM-2201
- BB-22
- BIM-018
- FUBIMINA
- PB-22
- SDB-001
- SDB-005
- THJ-018
- THJ-2201
