= FUB-APINACA =

Chemical compound

Legal status
- Legal status: CA: Schedule II; DE: NpSG (Industrial and scientific use only); UK: Class B; US: Schedule I

Identifiers
- IUPAC name: N-(Adamantan-1-yl)-1-[(4-fluorophenyl)methyl]-1H-indazole-3-carboxamide
- CAS Number: 2180933-90-6
- PubChem CID: 118796517
- ChemSpider: 30922497
- UNII: OF9Q7PH4UD
- CompTox Dashboard (EPA): DTXSID101336146

Chemical and physical data
- Formula: C_{25}H_{26}FN_{3}O
- Molar mass: 403.501 g·mol^{−1}
- 3D model (JSmol): Interactive image
- SMILES: O=C(NC1(C[C@H]2C3)C[C@H]3C[C@H](C2)C1)C4=NN(CC5=CC=C(F)C=C5)C6=C4C=CC=C6
- InChI: InChI=1S/C25H26FN3O/c26-20-7-5-16(6-8-20)15-29-22-4-2-1-3-21(22)23(28-29)24(30)27-25-12-17-9-18(13-25)11-19(10-17)14-25/h1-8,17-19H,9-15H2,(H,27,30)/t17-,18+,19-,25?; Key:MWBHSNBPUSKVDD-LPSAYFBNSA-N

FUB-APINACA (also known as A-FUBINACA according to the EMCCDA framework for naming synthetic cannabinoids and FUB-AKB48) is an indazole-based synthetic cannabinoid that is presumed to be a potent agonist of the CB_{1} receptor and has been sold online as a designer drug. It is an analog of APINACA and 5F-APINACA where the pentyl chain has been replaced with fluorobenzyl.

== Pharmacology ==
FUB-APINACA acts as a full agonist with a binding affinity of 1.06 nM at CB_{1} and 0.174 nM at CB_{2} cannabinoid receptors.

== Legal status ==
In the United States, FUB-APINACA was temporarily emergency scheduled by the DEA in 2019. and made a permanent Schedule I Controlled Substance nationwide on April 7, 2022. Previously, it was illegal only in Alabama (listed as FUB-AKB48).

Sweden's public health agency suggested classifying FUB-APINACA as a hazardous substance on November 10, 2014.

== See also ==
- 5F-ADB
- 5F-AMB
- AB-FUBINACA
- AB-CHFUPYCA
- AB-PINACA
- ADAMANTYL-THPINACA
- ADB-CHMINACA
- ADB-FUBINACA
- ADB-PINACA
- ADBICA
- APP-FUBINACA
- FAB-144
- MDMB-CHMINACA
- MDMB-FUBINACA
- PX-3
