= 5F-PB-22 =

Chemical compound

Legal status
- Legal status: BR: Class F2 (Prohibited psychotropics); CA: Schedule II; DE: Anlage II (Authorized trade only, not prescriptible); UK: Class B; US: Schedule I

Identifiers
- IUPAC name: 1-fluoropentyl-1H-indole-3-carboxylic acid 8-quinolinyl ester
- CAS Number: 1400742-41-7
- ChemSpider: 29341631
- UNII: QCB63R9792
- KEGG: C22718
- CompTox Dashboard (EPA): DTXSID60857138

Chemical and physical data
- Formula: C_{23}H_{21}FN_{2}O_{2}
- Molar mass: 376.431 g·mol^{−1}
- 3D model (JSmol): Interactive image
- SMILES: C1=CC=C2C(=C1)C(=CN2CCCCCF)C(=O)OC3=CC=CC4=C3N=CC=C4
- InChI: InChI=1S/C23H21FN2O2/c24-13-4-1-5-15-26-16-19(18-10-2-3-11-20(18)26)23(27)28-21-12-6-8-17-9-7-14-25-22(17)21/h2-3,6-12,14,16H,1,4-5,13,15H2; Key:MBOCMBFDYVSGLJ-UHFFFAOYSA-N

5F-PB-22 (5F-QUPIC or Quinolin-8-yl 1-fluoroPentyl-1H-Indole-3-8-Carboxylate) is a designer drug which acts as a cannabinoid agonist. The structure of 5F-PB-22 appears to have been designed with an understanding of structure–activity relationships within the indole class of cannabinoids.

The indazole analogue 5F-NPB-22 (5F-QUPINAC) is known.

== Pharmacology ==
5F-PB-22 acts as a full agonist with a binding affinity of 0.468 nM at CB_{1} and 0.633 nM at CB_{2} cannabinoid receptors.

== Legal status ==
As of October 2015 5F-PB-22 is a controlled substance in China.

In January 2014, 5F-PB-22 was designated as a Schedule I controlled substance in the United States after several deaths were associated with its use.

In the United Kingdom, 5F-PB-22 is now classified and controlled as a Class B drug, following the November 2016 amendment to the Misuse of Drugs Act 1971. Several other synthetic cannabinoids structurally related to JWH-018, like 5F-PB-22, were also classified in this amendment.

== See also ==
- AM-2201
- JWH-018
- QUCHIC
- QUPIC
- SDB-001
- SDB-005
- FDU-PB-22
