= PB-22 =

Chemical compound

Clinical data
- Other names: QUPIC; SGT-21, 1-(pentyl)-1H-indole-3-carboxylic acid 8-quinolinyl ester; quinolin-8-yl 1-pentyl-1H-indole-3-8-carboxylate

Legal status
- Legal status: CA: Schedule II; DE: Anlage II (Authorized trade only, not prescriptible); UK: Class B; US: Schedule I

Identifiers
- IUPAC name: 1-Pentyl-1H-indole-3-carboxylic acid 8-quinolinyl ester
- CAS Number: 1400742-17-7
- PubChem CID: 71604304
- ChemSpider: 29339966
- UNII: QM6J8F29FE
- CompTox Dashboard (EPA): DTXSID70856177
- ECHA InfoCard: 100.233.114

Chemical and physical data
- Formula: C_{23}H_{22}N_{2}O_{2}
- Molar mass: 358.441 g·mol^{−1}
- 3D model (JSmol): Interactive image
- SMILES: CCCCCN1C=C(C2=CC=CC=C21)C(=O)OC3=CC=CC4=C3N=CC=C4
- InChI: InChI=1S/C23H22N2O2/c1-2-3-6-15-25-16-19(18-11-4-5-12-20(18)25)23(26)27-21-13-7-9-17-10-8-14-24-22(17)21/h4-5,7-14,16H,2-3,6,15H2,1H3; Key:ZAVGICCEAOUWFM-UHFFFAOYSA-N

PB-22 (QUPIC, SGT-21 or 1-pentyl-1H-indole-3-carboxylic acid 8-quinolinyl ester) is a designer drug offered by online vendors as a cannabimimetic agent, and detected being sold in synthetic cannabis products in Japan in 2013. PB-22 represents a structurally unique synthetic cannabinoid chemotype, since it contains an ester linker at the indole 3-position, rather than the precedented ketone of JWH-018 and its analogs, or the amide of APICA and its analogs.

PB-22 has an EC_{50} of 5.1 nM for human CB_{1} receptors, and 37 nM for human CB_{2} receptors. PB-22 produces bradycardia and hypothermia in rats at doses of 0.3–3 mg/kg, suggesting potent cannabinoid-like activity. The magnitude and duration of hypothermia induced in rats by PB-22 was notably greater than JWH-018, AM-2201, UR-144, XLR-11, APICA, or STS-135, with a reduction of body temperature still observable six hours after dosing. One clinical toxicology study found PB-22 to be the cause of seizures in a human and his dog.

== History ==
PB-22 was originally developed by New Zealand legal highs company Stargate International in 2012 as SGT-21, intended to be a structural hybrid of QMPSB and JWH-018. However, no intellectual property protection was applied for and the compound quickly became subject to widespread grey-market sales outside the control of the inventors.

== Detection ==
A forensic standard of PB-22 is available, and the compound has been posted on the Forendex website of potential drugs of abuse.

== Legal status ==
As of 9 May 2014, PB-22 is no longer legal in New Zealand.

In January 2014, PB-22 was designated as a Schedule I controlled substance in the United States.

In Ohio, PB-22 is illegal.

Florida also has banned PB-22.

Since 13 December 2014 it is also illegal in Germany because of adding the substance to the BtMG Anlage II.

As of October 2015 PB-22 is a controlled substance in China.

== See also ==
- 5F-PB-22
- QUCHIC
- APICA
