= AMB-FUBINACA =

Chemical compound

Legal status
- Legal status: BR: Class F2 (Prohibited psychotropics); CA: Schedule II; DE: Anlage II (Authorized trade only, not prescriptible); UK: Class B; US: Schedule I; UN: Psychotropic Schedule II; Illegal in Sweden and Louisiana. As of December 2018 Scheduled as a Class A drug in New Zealand.

Identifiers
- IUPAC name: Methyl (2S)-2-{[1-[(4-fluorophenyl)methyl]indazole-3-carbonyl]amino}-3-methylbutanoate
- CAS Number: 1971007-92-7; racemic: 1715016-76-4
- PubChem CID: 119026173
- ChemSpider: 32741679
- UNII: TY9AKI870R; racemic: 2N1280157D
- KEGG: C22800
- CompTox Dashboard (EPA): DTXSID101009971

Chemical and physical data
- Formula: C_{21}H_{22}FN_{3}O_{3}
- Molar mass: 383.423 g·mol^{−1}
- 3D model (JSmol): Interactive image
- SMILES: COC([C@H](C(C)C)NC(C1=NN(C2=C1C=CC=C2)CC3=CC=C(F)C=C3)=O)=O
- InChI: InChI=1S/C21H22FN3O3/c1-13(2)18(21(27)28-3)23-20(26)19-16-6-4-5-7-17(16)25(24-19)12-14-8-10-15(22)11-9-14/h4-11,13,18H,12H2,1-3H3,(H,23,26)/t18-/m0/s1; Key:FRFFLYJQPCIIQB-SFHVURJKSA-N

AMB-FUBINACA (systematically named MMB-FUBINACA) is an indazole-based synthetic cannabinoid that is a potent agonist for the cannabinoid receptors, with K_{i} values of 10.04 nM at CB_{1} and 0.786 nM at CB_{2} and EC_{50} values of 0.5433 nM at CB_{1} and 0.1278 nM at CB_{2}, and has been sold online as a designer drug. It was originally developed by Pfizer which described the compound in a patent in 2009, but was later abandoned and never tested on humans. AMB-FUBINACA was the most common synthetic cannabinoid identified in drug seizures by the Drug Enforcement Administration in 2017 and the first half of 2018.

== Mass casualties ==
On July 12, 2016, the New York City Emergency Medical Services responded to a "mass casualty event" in Brooklyn, New York, where 33 people ranging in age from 25 to 59 years old were adversely affected by the drug. 18 were hospitalized. All of the victims were described by by-standers as “zombielike” and the cause was attributed to use of AMB-FUBINACA as the demethylated metabolite was found in the blood and urine of eight of the hospitalized patients that had been sent for testing by the DEA. Screening for the more usual drugs of abuse was negative in all 8 patients. AMB-FUBINACA itself was found in a sample from the product smoked by another patient. The metabolite was identified after 10 days and the AMB-FUBINACA was only confirmed 17 days after the incident.

Around 60 deaths in New Zealand were attributed to either AMB-FUBINACA or a related compound 5F-ADB during 2017–2018, with tested products containing between 32 mg/g and 400 mg/g of the active ingredient, between 2x to 25x stronger than the product involved in the mass casualty event in New York a year earlier.

== Nomenclature ==
MMB-FUBINACA is the correct systematic name derived using the EUDA synthetic cannabinoid naming scheme: methyl (S)-2-[1-(4-fluorobenzyl)-1H-indazole-3-carboxamido]-3-methylbutanoate.

The MMB comes from the linked methyl-3-methylbutanoate group, the FUB from the 4-fluorobenzyl "tail", the INA from the indazole core and the CA from the carboxamide linker.

AMB-FUBINACA systematically refers a related but different compound, for which the name AB-FUBINACA is used to distinguish it instead.

== Legal status ==
In the United States, AMB-FUBINACA is a Schedule I Controlled Substance. Prior to being scheduled at the federal level, the state of Louisiana banned AMB-FUBINACA through an emergency rule after it was detected in a synthetic cannabis product called "Train Wreck 2" which had been linked to adverse events and seizures on 3 June 2014.

Sweden's public health agency suggested classifying AMB-FUBINACA as a hazardous substance on November 10, 2014.

== See also ==
- 5F-AB-PINACA
- 5F-ADB
- 5F-AMB
- 5F-APINACA
- AB-CHFUPYCA
- AB-FUBINACA
- AB-PINACA
- ADB-CHMINACA
- ADB-FUBINACA
- ADB-PINACA
- ADSB-FUB-187
- APINACA
- MDMB-CHMICA
- MDMB-CHMINACA
- MDMB-FUBINACA
- PX-2
- PX-3
