= AM-2201 =

Chemical compound

Legal status
- Legal status: BR: Class F2 (Prohibited psychotropics); CA: Schedule II; DE: Anlage II (Authorized trade only, not prescriptible); NZ: Temporary Class; UK: Class B; US: Schedule I; UN: Psychotropic Schedule II

Identifiers
- IUPAC name: 1-[(5-Fluoropentyl)-1H-indol-3-yl]-(naphthalen-1-yl)methanone
- CAS Number: 335161-24-5
- PubChem CID: 53393997
- ChemSpider: 24751884
- UNII: TBJ0966F1O
- KEGG: C22771
- CompTox Dashboard (EPA): DTXSID50187158

Chemical and physical data
- Formula: C_{24}H_{22}FNO
- Molar mass: 359.444 g·mol^{−1}
- 3D model (JSmol): Interactive image
- SMILES: O=C(C1=CN(CCCCCF)C2=C1C=CC=C2)C3=CC=CC4=C3C=CC=C4
- InChI: InChI=1S/C24H22FNO/c25-15-6-1-7-16-26-17-22(20-12-4-5-14-23(20)26)24(27)21-13-8-10-18-9-2-3-11-19(18)21/h2-5,8-14,17H,1,6-7,15-16H2; Key:ALQFAGFPQCBPED-UHFFFAOYSA-N

AM-2201 (1-(5-fluoropentyl)-3-(1-naphthoyl)indole) is a recreational designer drug that acts as a potent but nonselective full agonist for the cannabinoid receptor. It is part of the AM series of cannabinoids discovered by Alexandros Makriyannis at Northeastern University.

== Hazards ==
Convulsions have been reported including at doses as low as 10 mg.

== Pharmacology ==
AM-2201 is a full agonist for cannabinoid receptors. Affinities are: with a K_{i} of 1.0 nM at CB_{1} and 2.6 nM at CB_{2}. The 4-methyl functional analog MAM-2201 probably has similar affinities. AM-2201 has an EC_{50} of 38 nM for human CB_{1} receptors, and 58 nM for human CB_{2} receptors. AM-2201 produces bradycardia and hypothermia in rats at doses of 0.3–3 mg/kg, comparable to the potency of JWH-018 in rats, suggesting potent cannabinoid-like activity.

=== Pharmacokinetics ===
AM-2201 metabolism differs only slightly from that of JWH-018. AM-2201 N-dealkylation produces fluoropentane instead of pentane (or plain alkanes in general).

== Detection ==
A forensic standard of AM-2201 is available, and the compound has been posted on the Forendex website of potential drugs of abuse.

== Legal status ==
In the United States, AM-2201 is a Schedule I controlled substance.

== See also ==
- AM-694
- AM-1235
- AM-2232
- AM-2233
- JWH-018
- SDB-005
- THJ-018
- THJ-2201
- MEPIRAPIM
- NM-2201
