= Synthetic cannabinoids =

Designer drugs

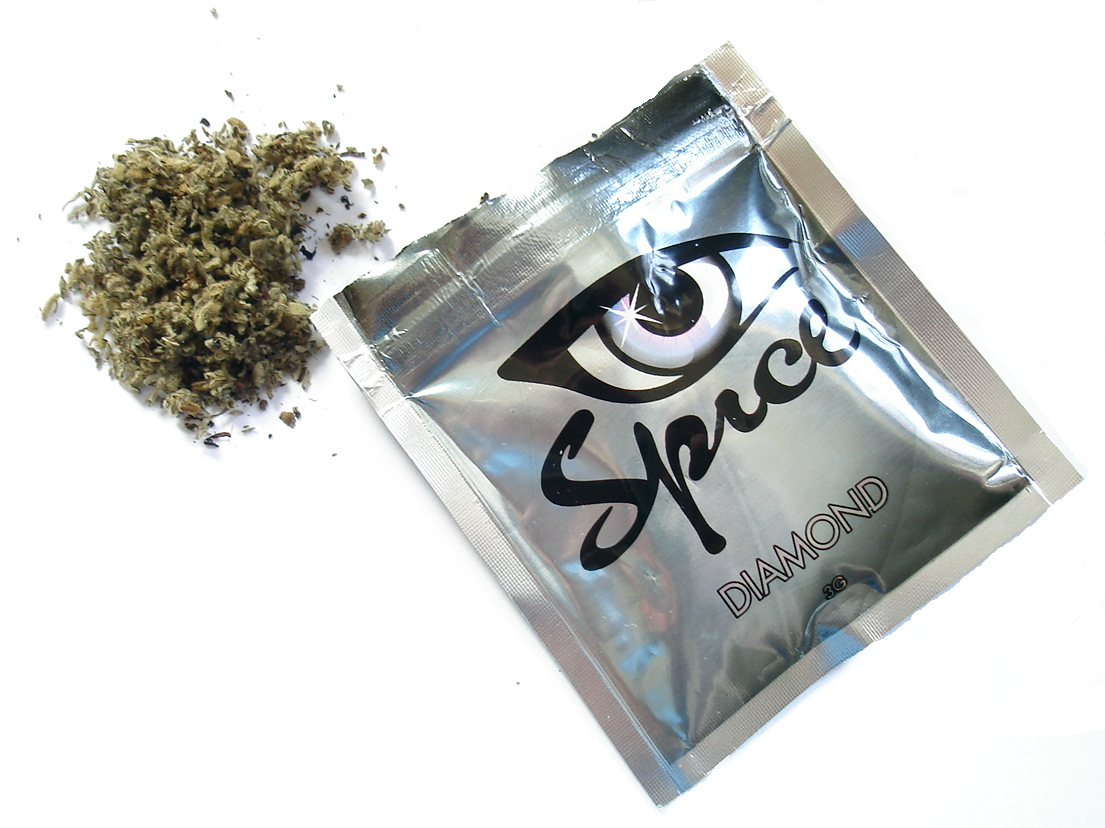
Bag and contents of a well-known early brand of synthetic cannabinoids named Spice that contains herbs covered with synthetic cannabinoids, now illegal throughout much of the world

Synthetic cannabinoids, or neocannabinoids, are a class of designer drug molecules that bind to the same receptors to which cannabinoids (e.g THC, CBD and CBN) in cannabis plants attach. These novel psychoactive substances should not be confused with synthetic phytocannabinoids (obtained by chemical synthesis) or synthetic endocannabinoids from which they are distinct in many aspects.

Typically, synthetic cannabinoids are sprayed onto plant matter and are usually smoked, although they have also been ingested as a concentrated liquid form in the United States and United Kingdom since 2016. They have been marketed as herbal incense, or "herbal smoking blends", and sold under common names such as K2, Five Spice, spice, and synthetic marijuana. They are often labeled "not for human consumption" to support a liability legal defense. A large and complex variety of synthetic cannabinoids are designed in an attempt to avoid legal restrictions on cannabis, making synthetic cannabinoids designer drugs.

Most synthetic cannabinoids are agonists of the cannabinoid receptors. They have been designed to be similar to THC, the natural cannabinoid with the strongest binding affinity to the CB_{1} receptor, which is linked to the psychoactive effects or "high" of marijuana. These synthetic analogs often have greater binding affinity and greater potency to the CB_{1} receptors. There are several synthetic cannabinoid families (e.g., AM-xxx, CP-xx,xxx, HU-xx, JWH-xxx) which are classified by the creator of the substance (e.g., JWH stands for John W. Huffman), which can include several substances with different base structures such as classical cannabinoids and unrelated naphthoylindoles.

Synthetic marijuana compounds began to be manufactured and sold in the early 2000s. From 2008 to 2014, 142 synthetic cannabinoid receptor agonists were reported to the European Monitoring-Center for Drugs and Drug Addiction (EMCDDA).

Reported user negative effects include palpitations, paranoia, intense anxiety, nausea, vomiting, confusion, poor coordination, and seizures. There have also been reports of a strong compulsion to re-dose, withdrawal symptoms, and persistent cravings. There have been several deaths linked to synthetic cannabinoids. The Centers for Disease Control and Prevention (CDC) found that the number of deaths from synthetic cannabinoid use tripled between 2014 and 2015. In 2018, the United States Food and Drug Administration warned of significant health risks from synthetic cannabinoid products that contain the rat poison brodifacoum, which is added because it is thought to reduce first pass metabolism. Severe illnesses and death have resulted from this practice.

== Synthetic cannabinoid products ==
It is often difficult to determine what is in these products without reagent testing because masking agents, such as tocopherol (or vitamin E acetate that causes vaping-associated pulmonary injury), eugenol, and fatty acids, are added to confound identification. Just as the synthetic cannabinoid(s) used differ between each synthetic cannabinoid product sold, so do the other contents of the counterfeit product.

=== Counterfeit black market cannabis products ===
- Counterfeit cannabis-liquid (c-liquid) for e-cigarettes: Synthetic cannabinoids are increasingly offered in e-cigarette form as "c-liquid". Several schoolchildren in Greater Manchester collapsed after vaping synthetic cannabinoids mis-sold as THC e-liquid.
- Counterfeit cannabis buds: Hemp buds (or low-potency cannabis buds) laced with synthetic cannabinoids.
- Counterfeit cannabis edible: The Florida Poison Information Center in Jacksonville warned parents in September 2020 that the number of people poisoned by fake marijuana edibles and candies has tripled.
- Counterfeit hashish: From December 2018, different samples of hashish have been found to contain synthetic cannabinoids.

=== Counterfeit CBD products ===
Synthetic cannabinoids appear in many CBD brands in products such as gummy bears and vape cartridges.

=== "Herb/incense" blends ===
==== Synthetic cannabinoids found in herb blends ====
Synthetic cannabinoid components of 'Spice' (a non-exhaustive list):

Compound	Type
HU-210	Classic cannabinoid
AM-694	Benzoylindole
RCS-4	Benzoylindole
WIN 48,098	Benzoylindole
CP-47,497	Cyclohexylphenol
JWH-018	Naphthoylindole
JWH-019	Naphthoylindole
JWH-073	Naphthoylindole
JWH-081	Naphthoylindole
JWH-122	Naphthoylindole
JWH-210	Naphthoylindole
AM-2201	Naphthoylindole
JWH-203	Phenylacetylindole
JWH-250	Phenylacetylindole
RCS-8	Phenylacetylindole

==== Non-cannabinoid chemicals found in herb blends ====
Most blends consist of synthetic cannabinoids sprayed onto inert vegetable matter, but some contain other psychoactive substances, including psychoactive herbs, e.g., wild dagga and Indian warrior, and psychoactive alkaloids, e.g., betonicine, aporphine, leonurine, nuciferine, and nicotine.

In 2013, AH-7921 was detected in smoking blends in Japan. In 2018, there was an outbreak of synthetic cannabinoids contaminated with anticoagulants, mainly brodifacoum, in at least 11 states in the US that caused coagulopathy (prolonged or excessive bleeding) and resulted in the treatment of over 300 people and at least eight deaths.

One of the most common non-cannabinoid ingredients in these products is oleamide, a fatty acid derivative that acts similarly to a cannabinoid and has hypnotic properties. Analysis of 44 products synthetic cannabinoid revealed oleamide in 7 of the products tested. Other non-cannabinoid ingredients that have been found in synthetic cannabinoid blends include harmine and harmaline, reversible monoamine oxidase inhibitors, which have been found with myristicin and asarone; substituted cathinone derived stimulant drugs such as 4-methylbuphedrone and 4'-methyl-alpha-PPP; and psychedelic tryptamine derivatives such as 4-HO-DET.

==== Herbs labeled on packages marketed as legal high ====
Packages of synthetic cannabinoid products can claim to contain a wide array of plants. However, oftentimes, none of the listed ingredients have been detectable. Herbal components of 'Spice' (a non-exhaustive list):

Common name	Psychoactive alkaloids	Species	Family
Beach bean	Unknown	Canavalia maritima; syn. C. rosea	Fabaceae
Blue/Sacred lotus	Nuciferine and aporphine	Nelumbo nucifera	Nelumbonaceae
Dog rose/Rosehip	Unknown	Rosa canina	Roseceae
Dwarf skullcap	Unknown	Scutellaria nana	Lamiacae
Honeyweed/Siberian motherwort	Leonurine	Leonurus sibiricus	Lamiaceae
Indian warrior	Unknown	Pedicularis densiflora	Orobanchaceae
Lion's ear/tail, Wild dagga	Leonurine	Leonotis leonurus	Lamiacae
'Maconha brava'	Genistein, apigenin	Zornia latifolia or Z. diphylla	Fabaceae
Marshmallow	Unknown	Althaea officinalis	Malvaceae
White and blue water lily	Nupharine, nymphaeine, aporphine and nuciferine	Nymphaea alba and N. caerulea	Nymphaeaceae

== Naming synthetic cannabinoids ==
Many of the early synthetic cannabinoids that were synthesized for use in research were named after either the scientist who first synthesized them or the institution or company where they originated.

Compounds	Inventor
AM	Alexandros Makriyannis
CP	Charles Pfizer
HU	Hebrew University
JWH	John W. Huffman

Some of the names of synthetic cannabinoids synthesized for recreational use were given names to help market the products. For example, AKB-48 (also known as APINACA) is also the name of a popular Japanese girl band; 2NE1 (also known as APICA) is also a South Korean girl band; and XLR-11 was named after the first US-developed liquid fuel rocket for aircraft. Now many synthetic cannabinoids are assigned names derived from their four main structural components, core, tail, linker, and linked group, where the name is formatted as LinkedGroup-TailCoreLinker. For example, in 5F-MDMB-PINACA (also known as 5F-ADB), 5F stands for the terminal fluorine or "fluorine on carbon 5" of the pentyl chain; MDMB stands for "methyl-3,3-dimethyl butanoate", the linked group; and PINACA stands for "pentyl chain (tail) indazole (core) carboxamide (linker)".

=== Common names ===
Use of the term "synthetic marijuana" to describe products containing synthetic cannabinoids is controversial and, according to Lewis Nelson, a medical toxicologist at the NYU School of Medicine, a mistake. Nelson claims that relative to marijuana, products containing synthetic cannabinoids "are really quite different, and the effects are much more unpredictable. It's dangerous". Since the term synthetic does not apply to the plant, but rather to the cannabinoid that the plant contains (THC), the term synthetic cannabinoid is more appropriate.

Nearly 700 "herbal incense" blends exist. They are often called "synthetic marijuana", "natural herbs", "herbal incense", or "herbal smoking blends" and often labeled "not for human consumption". In some Spanish-speaking countries, such as Chile and Argentina, such preparations are often referred to as cripy or crippy, a slang phonetic variant of the English word "creepy".

According to the Psychonaut Web Mapping Research Project, synthetic cannabinoids, sold under the brand name Spice, were first released in 2005 by the now-dormant company the Psyche Deli in London. In 2006, the brand gained popularity. According to the Financial Times, the assets of the Psyche Deli rose from £65,000 in 2006 to £899,000 in 2007. The EMCDDA reported in 2009 that Spice products were identified in 21 of the 30 participating countries.

=== Neocannabinoids ===
Because of these controversies, and in particular the difficulty of distinguishing natural cannabinoids obtained in laboratory (for example, CBD or synthetic THC) from artificial novel synthetic cannabinoid analog compounds not present in nature (like nabilone, Spice, the HU, JWH series, etc.), the term "neocannabinoid" has been proposed to name the latter.

== Uses ==
Synthetic cannabinoids were made for cannabinoid research focusing on tetrahydrocannabinol (THC), cannabinoid receptors, and the endocannabinoids that activate them in the body. Synthetic cannabinoids were needed partly due to legal restrictions on natural cannabinoids, which make them difficult to obtain for research. Many have been useful because they bind selectively to either the CB1 or CB2 receptors, whereas THC has a similar affinity for both. Tritium-labelled cannabinoids such as CP-55,940 were instrumental in discovering the cannabinoid receptors in the early 1990s.

Some early synthetic cannabinoids were also used clinically. Nabilone, a first generation synthetic THC analog, has been used as an antiemetic to combat vomiting and nausea since 1981. Synthetic THC (marinol, dronabinol) has been used as an antiemetic since 1985, and an appetite stimulant since 1991, although synthetic THC is often not listed among the "synthetic cannabinoids" but as a "synthetic phytocannabinoid".

In the early 2000s, synthetic cannabinoids began to be used for recreational drug use in an attempt to get similar effects to cannabis. Because synthetic cannabinoid molecular structures differ from THC and other illegal cannabinoids, synthetic cannabinoids were not technically illegal. Since the discovery of the use of synthetic cannabinoids for recreational use in 2008, some synthetic cannabinoids have been made illegal, but new analogs are continually synthesized to avoid the restrictions. Synthetic cannabinoids have also been used recreationally because they are inexpensive and are typically not revealed by the standard marijuana drug tests. Unlike nabilone, the synthetic cannabinoids found being used for recreational use did not have any documented therapeutic effects.

Critics of drug prohibition point to laws against marijuana as a cause for the popularity of synthetic products, and argue that cannabis legalization reduces demand for substitutes. The drug is most commonly used in populations that cannot easily acquire or consume marijuana, such as teenagers, inmates, people on probation or parole, and members of the armed forces subjected to regular drug testing.

== Toxicity ==
Because they activate the cannabinoid CB_{1} and CB_{2} receptors, many of the effects of synthetic cannabinoids are similar to those of THC. These are achieved at lower doses, because many synthetic cannabinoids are more potent than marijuana, and users are often unaware of exactly what they are getting and how potent it is. For example, Δ^{9}-THC has an EC_{50} of 250 nM at CB_{1} and 1157 nM at CB_{2}, whereas PB-22 has an EC_{50} of 5.1 nM at CB_{1} and 37 nM at CB_{2}. Adverse effects observed due to synthetic cannabinoid use include acute kidney injury, cardiac toxicity, seizure, stroke, tremor, hypokalemia, and rhabdomyolysis.

Some negative effects of 5F-PB-22 reported by users included nausea, vomiting, confusion, poor coordination, anxiety, and seizures. Some of the negative effects of 5F-AKB-48 reported by users included palpitations, paranoia, intense anxiety, and a taste like burned plastic. While there are no fatal overdose cases linked to marijuana, there are deaths linked to synthetic cannabinoids each year. The most common mechanisms leading to death following synthetic cannabinoid use include behavioral risks, such as self-harm and suicide, falling from a height, and wandering into traffic; cardiovascular effects; and central nervous system depression.

Researchers have pointed out a few ways that synthetic cannabinoids differ from marijuana, and therefore may be more dangerous. First, they often have greater intrinsic activity. Many of the synthetic cannabinoids are full agonists of the cannabinoids receptors, CB_{1} and CB_{2}, compared to THC, which is only a partial agonist. Secondly, they may have other actions in the body, in addition to activating cannabinoid receptors. Some may work on NMDA glutamate receptors. Some may also work on serotonin, either indirectly by inhibiting MAO and increasing 5-HT_{1A} expression, or by directly binding to serotonin receptors, including the 5-HT_{1A} and 5-HT_{3} subtypes; some researchers speculate that this activity may be because the indole moiety that some synthetic cannabinoids possess is similar to the structure of serotonin.

Third, synthetic cannabinoids may break down into metabolites, or create other by-products when heated, that may differ from marijuana. Phase 1 metabolism of JWH-018 results in at least nine monohydroxylated metabolites, three of which have been shown to be full agonists of the CB_{1} receptors, compared to the metabolism of THC, which only results in one psychoactive monohydroxylated metabolite. The metabolite N-(3-hydroxypentyl) JWH-018 was found to have toxic effects that its parent compound does not. Some metabolites even appear to be cannabinoid antagonists. Lastly, they may contain unwanted substances, be mislabeled, or contain different doses than advertised (in one analysis, a difference of one log unit was found).

No official studies have been conducted on the effects of synthetic cannabinoids on humans (as is often the case with illegal and potentially toxic compounds); however, user reports and the effects experienced by patients seeking medical care after taking synthetic cannabinoids have been published. Each of the many different synthetic cannabinoids can have different effects at different dosages. The CDC described synthetic cannabinoid overdoses between 2010 and 2015 and of 277 drug overdose patients who reported synthetic cannabinoid as the sole agent, 66.1% reported problems in the central nervous system (e.g., agitation, coma, toxic psychosis), 17% reported cardiovascular problems (e.g., tachycardia, bradycardia), 7.6% reported pulmonary problems (5.4% of which had respiratory depression), and 4% reported acute kidney injury.

Four postmortem cases linked to the synthetic cannabinoids 5F-PB-22 have been reviewed. The postmortem blood specimens contained a range of 1.1–1.5 ng/mL of 5F-PB-22. Three of the four cases were sudden episodes and the symptoms leading to death included acute shortness of breath; vasocongestion in the liver, spleen, and kidneys; bilateral pulmonary edema; dead inflamed tissue (necrotizing granulomatous inflammation); and congestion of most internal organs. The fourth case presented to the hospital with severe problems that deteriorated over the course of a day, ending with circulatory, respiratory, central nervous system, and renal failure.

=== Addiction ===
There have been reports of a strong compulsion to re-dose, withdrawal symptoms, and persistent cravings lasting up to a week after taking synthetic cannabinoids, indicating that synthetic cannabinoids may be more addictive than marijuana.

=== Psychosis ===
Studies have strongly linked particular synthetic cannabinoids with psychosis, including cannabis-induced psychotic disorder (CIPD). The use of synthetic cannabinoids can be associated with psychosis and physicians are beginning to investigate if some patients with inexplicable psychotic symptoms may have at one point used synthetic cannabinoids. In contrast to most other recreational drugs, the dramatic psychotic state induced by use of synthetic cannabinoids has been reported, in multiple cases, to persist for several weeks, and in one case for seven months, after complete cessation of drug use.

Some studies suggest that not only can synthetic cannabinoids induce psychosis, but they can worsen previously stable psychotic disorders and might trigger a chronic (long-term) psychotic disorder among vulnerable individuals such as those with a family history of mental illness. Individuals with risk factors for psychotic disorders are often counseled against using synthetic cannabinoids. Psychiatrists have suggested that the lack of an antipsychotic chemical, like CBD in natural cannabis, may make synthetic cannabinoids more likely to induce psychosis than natural cannabis.

== Structural classifications ==
Structural classifications of synthetic cannabinoids
Classification	Examples
Adamantoylindoles or indazole carboxamide	5F-AKB-48, APICA, STS-135
Benzimidazoles	AZ-11713908, AZD-1940
Phenylacetylindoles	JWH-250, RCS-8
Cyclohexylphenols	CP-47,947, CP-55,940
Dibenzopyrans	JWH-051, JWH-056, HU-210
Eicosanoids	AM-883, AM-1346, O-585, O-689
Naphtylindenes	JWH-171, JWH-176
Indazole carboxamides	AB-PINACA, AB-FUBINACA
Indazole-3-carboxamides	AB-CHMINACA, AB-FUBINACA, PX-2, PX-3
Indole-3-carboxamides	CUMYL-BICA, CUMYL-CBMICA, Org 28312, Org 28611
Indole-3-carboxylates or aryloxycarbonylindole	FDU-PB-22, FUB-PB-22
Naphthoylindazoles	THJ-018, THJ-2201
Naphthoylindoles	AM-1221, AM-2201, JWH-007, JWH-018, JWH-073, JWH-200, JWH-398, WIN-55,212-2
Phenylacetylindoles	JWH-167, JWH-203
Pyrazolecarboxamides	5F-AB-FUPPYCA, AB-CHFUPYCA
Pyrrolobenzoxazines or naphthoylindole	WIN 55,212-2
Quinolinyl esters or aryloxycarbonylindole	PB-22, 5F-PB-22
Tetramethylcyclo-propylcarbonylindazoles	FAB-144
Tetramethylcyclo-propylcarbonylindoles	A-796,260, A-834,735, UR-144, XLR-11, XLR-12

There are five major categories for synthetic cannabinoids: classical cannabinoids, non-classical cannabinoids, hybrid cannabinoids, aminoalkylindoles, and eicosanoids. Classical cannabinoids are analogs of THC that are based on a dibenzopyran ring. They were developed starting in the 1960s, following the isolation of THC, and were originally the only cannabinoids synthesized. Classical cannabinoids include nabilone and dronabinol, and one of the best known synthetic classical cannabinoids is HU-210. HU-210 is a chiral compound first synthesized by Raphael Mechoulam at Hebrew University in the 1980s. It was discovered in herbal incense products by the U.S. Customs and Border Protection in January 2009; however, classical cannabinoids are not often seen in synthetic cannabinoid blends for recreational use, likely because they are difficult to synthesize.

Non-classical cannabinoids include cyclohexylphenols (CP), which were first synthesized in the late 1970s to 1980s by Pfizer as potential analgesics. The C8 homologue of CP-47,497 (CP-47,497-C8) was one of the first synthetic cannabinoids being used recreationally. CP-47,497-C8 is made by extending the dimethylheptyl side chain of CP-47,497 to a dimethyloctyl side chain. It was discovered by forensic scientists in a herbal blend known as "Spice" in 2008, along with JWH-018, an aminoalkylindole.

Hybrid cannabinoids have a combination of classical and non-classical cannabinoid structural features. For example, AM-4030, a derivative of HU-210, is a hybrid cannabinoid because it has the dibenzopyran ring common of classical cannabinoids and an aliphatic hydroxyl group common in the CP family of nonclassical cannabinoids.

Aminoalkylindoles are structurally dissimilar to THC and include naphthoylindoles (JWH-018), phenylacetylindoles (JWH-250), and benzoylindoles (AM-2233). Aminoalkylindoles are considered to be the most common synthetic cannabinoids found in synthetic cannabinoid blends, likely due to the fact that these molecules are easier to synthesize than classical and non-classical cannabinoids. The JWH molecules were first synthesized by John William Huffman at Clemson University in the late 1990s. The FBI concluded in a 2012 memo that as a result of the publication of J.W. Huffman's research, people searching for a "marijuana-like-high" would follow his recipes and methods.

Eicosanoid synthetic cannabinoids are analogs of endocannabinoids, such as anandamide. Endocannabinoids are cannabinoids naturally occurring in the body. One of the best known synthetic analogs of anandamide is methanandamide.

Some synthetic cannabinoids have even greater structural diversity, possibly to subvert legal regulations on earlier generations of synthetic cannabinoids. There are a few different structural classifications of synthetic cannabinoids that include many of the new structures, some of which are shown in table one. The indazole carboxamide group, including APINACA (AKB-48), an adamantyl indazole carboxamide, and AB-PINACA, an aminocarbonyl indazole carboxamide, is an example of a new group of synthetic cannabinoids. Most clandestine manufacturers and producers only make small changes to the structure of a synthetic cannabinoid, such as changing an indole to indazole structure (AM-2201 to THJ-2201) or terminal fluorine replacement; however, one group that was unprecedented when discovered by forensic scientists in 2013, was the quinolinyl ester synthetic cannabinoids.

PB-22 and 5F-PB-22 were the first synthetic cannabinoids to include a quinoline substructure and an ester linkage. These compounds are thought to have been synthesized with the intention of making a synthetic cannabinoid prodrug, which might improve absorption and confound detection. Ester bonds are easily biodegradable through spontaneous or endogenous, nonspecific esterase hydrolysis, which has been commonly used in medicinal chemistry to make ester prodrugs. The reason for the change to the quinolone substructure is unknown, but it may have been found to be a suitable replacement for the naphthoyl moiety that is currently regulated by US scheduling laws.

Although most synthetic cannabinoids are not direct analogs of THC, they share many common features with THC. Most are lipid-soluble, non-polar, small molecules (usually 20–26 carbon atoms) that are fairly volatile, making them "smokable", like THC. Another common feature of most synthetic cannabinoids and THC is a side-chain of five to nine saturated carbon atoms. It has been found that this chain of carbons is required for optimal psychotropic activity from binding CB_{1} receptors. Also, most synthetic cannabinoids are agonists of both cannabinoid receptors, CB_{1} and CB_{2}, like THC; however, they often have greater binding affinity and therefore greater potency than THC, as seen in table two. Due to the greater potency, the standard doses of many synthetic cannabinoids may be less than 1 mg.

Structure, binding affinity, and potency of popular synthetic cannabinoids and THC
Name	Year identified by forensics	Structural classification	Structure	CB_{1} binding affinity (nM)	CB_{2} binding affinity (nM)	CB_{1} EC_{50} (nM)	CB_{2} EC_{50} (nM)
Δ^{9}-THC (control phytocannabinoid)		Classical cannabinoid		41 ± 2	36 ± 10	250	1157
HU-210	2009	Classical cannabinoid		0.061 ± 0.007	0.52 ± 0.04		
(C8) CP 47,497	2008	Non-classical cannabinoid (cyclohexylphenol)		2.20 ± 0.47			
JWH-018	2008	Aminoalkylindole (naphthoylindoles)		9.0 ± 5.0	2.94 ± 2.65	102	133
AM-2201 (Fluorinated JWH-018)	2011	Aminoalkylindole (naphthoylindoles)		1.0	2.6	38	58
UR-144	2010	Tetramethylcyclopropylindoles		29 ± 0.9	4.5 ± 1.7	421	72
XLR-11 (Fluorinated UR-144)	2012	Tetramethylcyclopropylindoles		24 ± 4.6	2.1 ± 0.6	98	83
APICA	2012	Adamantoylindole				128	29
STS-135 (Fluorinated APICA)		Adamantoylindole				51	13
AB-PINACA	2012	Indazole carboxamide				1.2	2.5
PB-22	2013	Quinolinyl ester				5.1	37
5F-PB-22 (Fluorinated PB-22)		Quinolinyl ester		0.468	0.633	2.8	11

=== Stereospecificity ===
Most classical, non-classical, and hybrid synthetic cannabinoids have stereospecificity (one stereoisomer is usually much more potent than the other(s)). For example, HU-210 is the (–) enantiomer of 11-OH-Δ^{8}-THC-DMH and a full agonist of the CB_{1} receptor; the (+) enantiomer of 11-OH-D^{8}-THC-DMH, known as HU-211, is a NMDA receptor antagonist and is largely inactive as a cannabinoid. On the other hand, aminoalkylindoles, eicosanoids, and the other new synthetic cannabinoid groups typically do not have an asymmetric center, so they are usually not stereospecific.

=== Fluorination of terminal carbon ===
Recently there has been an increase in the emergence of terminally fluorinated synthetic cannabinoids, such as 5F-PB-22 (fluorinated version of PB-22) and XLR-11 (fluorinated version of UR-144). South Korea's National Forensic Service reported that 90% of all seized synthetic cannabinoids in 2013 were fluorinated, compared to no fluorinated synthetic cannabinoids reported in 2010. 5F-derivations (terminal fluorination) of the synthetic cannabinoids have been found to be about 2–5 times more potent at CB_{1} receptors than their un-fluorinated counterparts, as shown in table two.

== Detection in bodily fluids ==
Synthetic cannabinoids are typically not identified by the standard marijuana drug tests including the immunoassay test (EMIT), GC-MS screening, and multi-target screening by LC-GC/MS because those tests only detect the presence of THC and its metabolites. Although most synthetic cannabinoids are analogs of THC, they are structurally different enough that, for example, the specific antibodies in the EMIT for marijuana do not bind to them. Due to their high potency, a very small dose of synthetic cannabinoids is used. Synthetic cannabinoids are highly metabolized by the body, so the window to detect the parent drug (the synthetic cannabinoid itself) in blood and oral fluid is very small.

Serum concentrations of synthetic cannabinoids are generally in the 1–10 μg/L range during the first few hours after recreational usage and the metabolites are usually present in urine at similar concentrations. Little to no parent drug is present in urine, so there is a lot of research to try and identify the major urinary metabolites that could be used as markers of synthetic cannabinoid intake. The major urinary metabolites in most cases are formed by oxidation of the alkyl side-chain to an alcohol and carboxylic acid followed by glucuronide conjugation and also by N-dealkylation and aromatic hydroxylation.

For example, the main metabolites of JWH-018, of which there are over 20, include carboxylated, monohydroxylated, dihydroxylated, and trihydroxylated metabolites, but they are mostly excreted in urine as glucuronide conjugates. The presence of synthetic cannabinoids or their metabolites in bodily fluids may be determined using specifically targeted commercially available immunoassay screening methods (EMIT), while liquid chromatography-mass spectrometry is most often used for confirmation and quantitation. There are commercially available EMIT kits for the screening of the synthetic cannabinoids JWH-018, JWH-073, JWH-398, JWH-200, JWH-019, JWH-122, JWH-081, JWH-250, JWH-203, CP-47,497, CP-47,497-C8, HU-210, HU-211, AM-2201, AM-694, RCS-4, and RCS-8 through companies like NMS Labs, Cayman Chemical, and Immunoanalysis Corporation.

== Notable incidents ==
=== New Zealand ===
In September 2018, at least 10 people overdosed on a synthetic cannabinoid, either AMB-FUBINACA or AB, in Christchurch over two days. Some of the people were in critical condition in the Intensive Care Unit.

=== United States ===
In October 2011, the Louisiana State University football program announced that it had suspended three players, including star cornerback Tyrann Mathieu, who tested positive for synthetic cannabinoids.

On July 12, 2016, 33 people were intoxicated by an herbal "incense" product called "AK-47 24 Karat Gold", and dozens overdosed, in Brooklyn. Eighteen people were transported to local hospitals. The herbal "incense" product was determined to be a synthetic cannabinoid called AMB-FUBINACA.

Since March 2018, Illinois, Wisconsin, Maryland, and eight other states in the United States have had an outbreak of severe bleeding caused by a synthetic cannabinoid contaminated with brodifacoum, a rat poison that causes bleeding. Illinois was hit the hardest and on April 5, 2018, the CDC issued a Clinical Action alert to health care providers across the United States advising of 89 confirmed cases of "serious unexplained bleeding" in Illinois. The cases are still being studied; however, 63 of the patients reported synthetic cannabinoid use, and laboratory analysis confirmed brodifacoum was present in at least 18 patients. As of April 24, 2018, 153 cases, including four deaths, linked to this outbreak have been reported to the Illinois Department of Public Health (IDPH) since March 7, 2018. On September 18, 2018, the Wisconsin Department of Health Services confirmed 16 more cases, bringing the total number of people affected by the outbreak in Wisconsin to 80 people since March 2018, including one death in July 2018.

In August 2018, there were almost one hundred overdose cases reported over two days in New Haven, Connecticut, from a bad batch of K2. The synthetic cannabinoid was believed to have been mixed with fentanyl, although no fentanyl was identified in samples of the drug tested by the DEA.

From September 21–22, 2018, almost 50 people overdosed and two people died in the Kensington area of Philadelphia. Officials believed the cause to be a combination of heroin or fentanyl and a synthetic cannabinoid. This same area in Philadelphia had 155 people overdose and 10 people die from a combination of heroin, fentanyl, and a synthetic cannabinoid called 5F-ADB over one weekend in July 2018. The Department of Public Health released that they believe "5F-ADB was the primary cause of the cluster of patients with these adverse drug reactions."

On December 10, 2021, the Hillsborough County, Florida department of health reported cases of "rat poison" contaminated synthetic blends linked to symptoms associated with coagulopathy, a condition where the blood's ability to clot is impaired. Two deaths and over 41 hospitalizations have been directly linked to this specific outbreak as of December 16, 2021.

== Research ==
=== Vaping-associated pulmonary injury ===
Synthetic cannabinoids have been speculated to be involved in vaping-associated pulmonary injury (VAPI).

== Legal restrictions and regional availability ==
=== Europe ===
==== Austria ====
The Austrian Ministry of Health announced in December 2008 that Spice would be controlled under their drug-law on the grounds that it contains an active substance that affects the functions of the body, and the legality of JWH-018 is under review.

==== Germany ====
JWH-018, CP 47,497 and the C6, C8, and C9 homologues of CP 47,497 have been illegal in Germany since January 2009. Since November 2016, about 80–90% of the substances belonging to the group of synthetic cannabinoids are illegal in Germany as the law does not cover all chemical structures.

==== France ====
JWH-018, CP 47,497 (and its homologues), and HU-210 were all made illegal in France in February 2009.

==== Ireland ====
From June 2010, JWH-018, along with a variety of other designer drugs, has been illegal.

==== Latvia ====
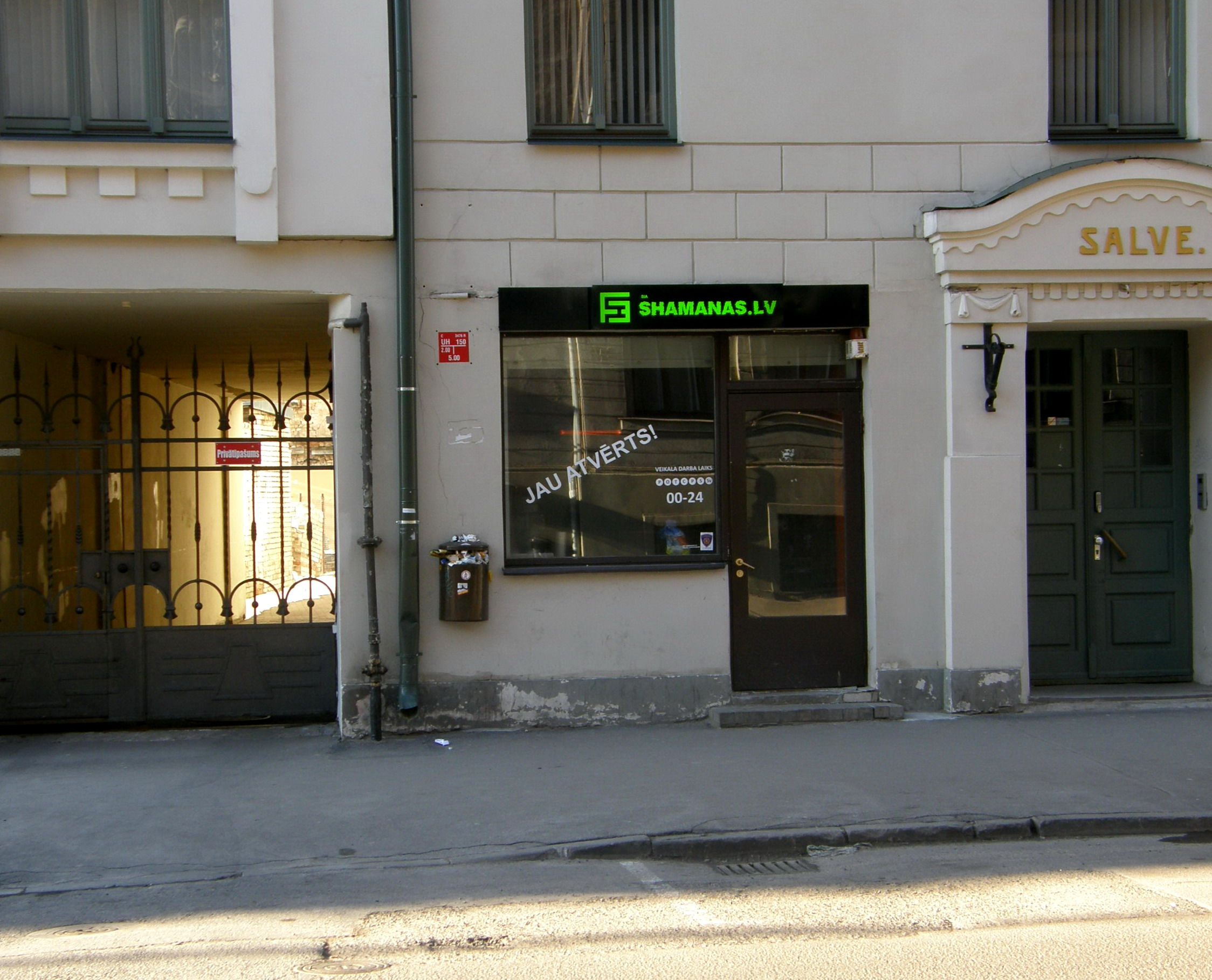
A store selling synthetic cannabinoids in Riga in 2012

JWH-018, JWH-073, CP 47,497 (and its homologues), and HU-210, as well as leonotis leonurus, have been all banned in Latvia since 2005. After the first confirmed lethal case from the use of legal drugs in late 2013, parliament significantly increased the number of temporarily banned substances used in Spice and similar preparations. In April 2014, parliament made selling of the temporarily banned substances a criminal offense.

==== Poland ====
JWH-018 and many of the herbs mentioned on the ingredient lists of Spice and similar preparations were made illegal in May 2009. The bill was passed by Polish Sejm and Polish Senat and was signed by the President.

==== Romania ====
Spice was made illegal in Romania in February 2010. In September 2018, Spice was made legal for personal use. A new law was passed in 2019 to make spice illegal for personal use again.

==== Russia ====
In April 2009, the Chief Medical Officer of the Russian Federation issued a resolution on reinforcing control over the sales of smoking-blends. These blends, marketed under the trade names AM-HI-CO, Dream, Spice (Gold, Diamond), Zoom, Ex-ses, Yucatán Fire and others, have been declared to contain Salvia divinorum, Hawaiian wood rose, and blue lotus, and are prohibited to be sold. These substances have been found to have "psychotropic, narcotic effects, contain poisonous components and represent potential threat for humans". The resolution does not mention JWH-018 or other synthetic cannabinoids. In January 2010, the Russian government issued a statement including 23 synthetic cannabinoids found in smoking blends Hawaiian Rose and Blue Lotus on the list of prohibited narcotic and psychotropic substances.

About 780 new psychoactive substances were added to the list from 2011 to 2014. The drug-makers avoided all the bans by making slight changes to the drugs. In the autumn of 2014, more than 2000 Spice consumers in Russia sought medical attention, 1000 were admitted to hospitals, and 40 people died. In October 2014, President Vladimir Putin brought in a bill that increased the penalty for selling or consuming smoking blends from a fine to up to eight years in prison.

==== Slovakia ====
Spice is legal in Slovakia. The National Anti-Drug Unit is considering adding it to the list of controlled substances. The latest anti-drug law version (468/2009) valid since January 2010 does not mention active compounds of Spice.

==== Spain ====
Spice is unregulated in Spain. For this reason, Spice is available in grow shop stores or cannabis related stores, and it can be bought and shipped online without any legal impediment from those kind of stores.

==== Sweden ====
CP 47,497-C6, CP 47,497-C7, CP 47,497-C8, CP 47,497-C9, JWH-018, JWH-073, and HU-210 were all made illegal in Sweden in September 2009.

==== Switzerland ====
Spice has been banned in Switzerland.

==== Turkey ====
Spice, which is colloquially called bonzai in Turkey, was added to the list of drugs and psychotropic substances in July 2011.

==== United Kingdom ====
The UK controls synthetic cannabinoids by analog under the Misuse of Drugs Act 1971 as Class B drugs. Until 2016, synthetic cannabinoids were legally sold in head shops, although the exact compounds available changed over time based on the legislation. The UK saw three generations of synthetic cannabinoids within five years where the second and third generations emerged in response to amendments to the Misuse of Drugs Act 1971 (Amendment) Orders 2009 and 2013, which classified many first and second generation synthetic cannabinoids as Class B drugs. There were two additional amendments in 2016 and 2019, which included in the analog controls many of the most popular synthetic cannabinoids circulating at the time. In May 2016, the Psychoactive Substances Act 2016 was enacted, which made illegal the production, distribution, sale, supply, and possession in correctional institutions of any substance for human consumption with psychoactive effects. This stopped the open sale of synthetic cannabinoids in head shops, although they are still found in use.

=== North America ===
==== Canada ====
Spice is not specifically prohibited in Canada, but synthetic cannabis mimics are listed as a schedule II drug. Schedule II to the Controlled Drugs and Substances Act makes reference to specific synthetic compounds JWH-XXX and AM-XXXX, although is not limiting to those identified. Health Canada is debating the subject. Schedule II has consisted entirely of synthetic cannabinoids since October 2018. These remain illegal following the removal from the schedule of cannabis and its constituents derived from nature.

==== United States ====
The case of David Mitchell Rozga, an American teenager from Indianola, Iowa, brought international attention to K2. Rozga shot himself in the head with a family-owned hunting rifle in an apparent suicide on June 6, 2010. After news of Rozga's death, it was reported by friends that they had smoked K2 with Rozga approximately one hour before his death. The nature of his death and reports from numerous family members, led investigators to suspect that Rozga was under the influence of a mind-altering substance when he died. The death of Rozga influenced political lobbying against K2, and other legal synthetic drugs such as bath salts. Following the incident, the "David Mitchell Rozga Act" to ban the use and distribution of K2 was introduced by Iowa Senator Chuck Grassley. It was passed by the United States Congress in June 2011. On July 10, 2012, President Barack Obama signed the Synthetic Drug Abuse Prevention Act of 2012 into law. It banned synthetic compounds commonly found in synthetic marijuana, placing them under Schedule I of the Controlled Substances Act.

Prior to that, some synthetic cannabis compounds (HU-210) were scheduled in the US under federal law, while others (JWH-073) were temporarily scheduled until final determination of their status could be made. The Drug Enforcement Administration (DEA) considered K2 to be a "drug of concern", citing "a surge in emergency-room visits and calls to poison-control centers. Adverse health effects associated with its use include seizures, hallucinations, paranoid behavior, agitation, anxiety, nausea, vomiting, racing heartbeat, and elevated blood pressure."

Several states independently passed acts making it illegal under state law, including Kansas in March 2010, Georgia and Alabama in May 2010, Tennessee and Missouri in July 2010, Louisiana in August 2010, Mississippi in September 2010, and Iowa. An emergency order was passed in Arkansas in July 2010 banning the sale of synthetic cannabis mimics. In October 2010, the Oregon Board of Pharmacy listed synthetic cannabinoid chemicals on its Schedule 1 of controlled substance, which means that the sale and possession of these substances is illegal under the Oregon Uniform Controlled Substances Act.

According to the National Conference of State Legislatures, several other states also considered legislation, including New Jersey, New York, Florida, and Ohio. Illinois banned all synthetic cannabinoids in January 2011. Michigan banned synthetic cannabinoids in October 2010. South Dakota banned these products in February 2012. Indiana banned synthetic cannabinoids in March 2012. North Carolina banned synthetic cannabis mimics by a unanimous vote of the state senate, due to concerns that its contents and effects are reasonably similar to cannabis, and may cause equal effects in terms of psychological dependency.

Following cases in Japan involving the use of synthetic cannabinoids by navy, army and marine corps personnel, they were officially banned. A punitive general order issued in January 2010, by the Commander Marine Corps Forces, Pacific prohibits the actual or attempted possession, use, sale, distribution and manufacture of synthetic cannabis mimics as well as any derivative, analogue or variant of it. In June 2010, the US Air Force issued a memorandum that banned the possession and use of Spice, or any other mood-altering substance except alcohol or tobacco, among its service members.

Usage among 8th, 10th, and 12th graders has been decreasing since 2011, while use of botanical marijuana has remained stable. There are important regional differences, with large declines in the Western and Southern US, and increases in the Northeast and Midwest.

Dronabinol
Exceptional are synthetic ∆^{9}-THC (dronabinol) -containing FDA-approved drug products with a currently accepted medical use in treatment in the United States, such as Syndros and Marinol, which are, respectively, under Schedule II and Schedule III of the CSA.

=== South America ===
==== Chile ====
The Chilean Ministry of Health in April 2009, declared the sale of synthetic cannabis mimics to be illegal.

=== Asia ===
==== South Korea ====
South Korea added JWH-018, CP 47,497 and HU-210 to the controlled substance list in July 2009, effectively making these chemicals illegal.

==== Indonesia ====
Tembakau Gorilla (Gorilla Tobacco), a catch-all term for synthetic cannabinoids blended in tobacco products, were listed as Class I Narcotics with no therapeutic use in 2017.

==== Japan ====
Japan has banned JWH-018, CP 47, 497, and homologues, and HU-210 since October 2009.

==== United Arab Emirates ====
The United Arab Emirates had stated that Spice is an illegal substance and possession or intent to sell is a jailable offense.

=== Oceania ===
==== Australia ====
In June 2011, the Western Australian government banned all of the synthetic cannabinoids found in already existing products, including brands such as Kronic, Kalma, Voodoo, Kaos, and Mango Kush. Western Australia was the first state in Australia to prohibit the sale of certain synthetic cannabinoids. In June 2013, an interim ban made a large list of product brands and synthetic substances illegal to sell anywhere in Australia. This ban lapsed on October 13, 2013, and a permanent ban has not been imposed. Synthetic cannabinoids and related products remain illegal in NSW, where a bill was passed in September 2013, that bans entire families of synthetic drugs instead of only banning existing compounds that have been identified. The introduction of this law makes NSW the first state in Australia to completely ban substances with psychoactive properties.

==== New Zealand ====
Synthetic Cannabinoids are illegal in New Zealand, it is classified as a Class A controlled drug. The New Zealand Parliament passed a law in July 2013 banning the sale of legal highs in dairies and supermarkets, but allowing some "low risk" drugs to continue to be sold through speciality licensed shops. Synthetic cannabinoids, as well as all other legal highs were outlawed in May 2014.

An analysis of 41 different synthetic cannabis mimic blends sold commercially in New Zealand, conducted by the Institute of Environmental Science and Research and released in July 2011, found 11 different synthetic cannabinoid ingredients used, including JWH-018, JWH-073, AM-694, AM-2201, RCS-4, RCS-4 butyl homologue, JWH-210, JWH-081, JWH-250 (or possibly JWH-302, isomer not determined), JWH-203, and JWH-122—with between one and five different active ingredients, though JWH-018 was present in 37 of the 41 blends tested. In two brands, the benzodiazepine anxiolytic drug phenazepam was also found, which is classified as a prescription medicine in New Zealand, and these brands were ordered to be removed from the market by emergency recall.

Since this time, a further 15 cannabinoid compounds have been detected as ingredients of synthetic cannabis mimicking blends in New Zealand and banned as temporary class drugs. In 2013, another hypnotic medication, zaleplon, was found to have been used as an active ingredient in a blend that had been sold in New Zealand during 2011 and 2012.

== See also ==
- List of cannabinoids § Synthetic cannabinoids
- List of designer drugs § Synthetic cannabinoids
- Endocannabinoid enhancer
- Endocannabinoid system
- Structural scheduling of synthetic cannabinoids
- Synthetic Cannabinoid Use Disorder
