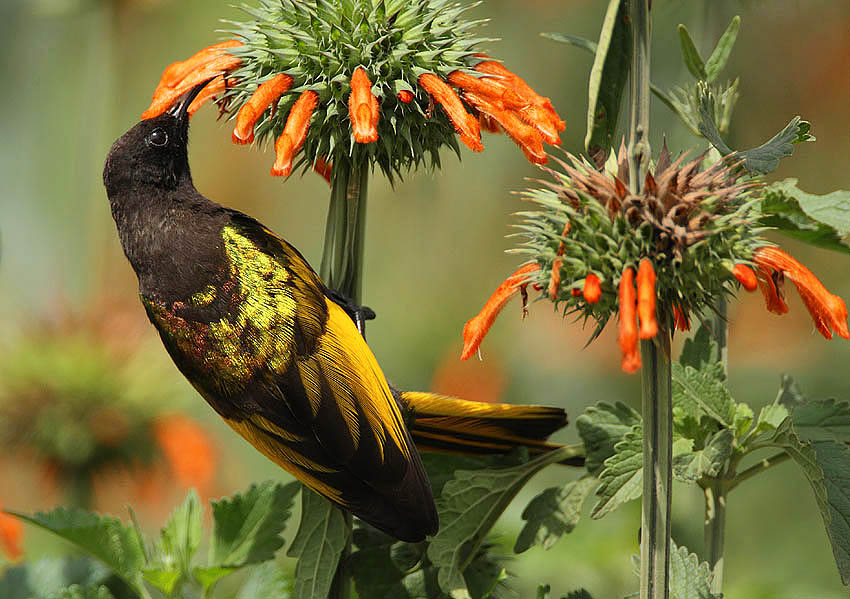
- A male in breeding plumage in Kenya feeding on Leonotis nectar

Conservation status
- Least Concern (IUCN 3.1)

Scientific classification
- Kingdom: Animalia
- Phylum: Chordata
- Class: Aves
- Order: Passeriformes
- Family: Nectariniidae
- Genus: Drepanorhynchus; Fischer & Reichenow, 1884
- Species: D. reichenowi

Binomial name
- Drepanorhynchus reichenowi Fischer, GA, 1884

Subspecies
- D. r. reichenowi; D. r. lathburyi; D. r. shellyae

Synonyms
- Nectarinia reichenowi

= Golden-winged sunbird =

Species of bird

The golden-winged sunbird (Drepanorhynchus reichenowi) is a species of bird in the family Nectariniidae. Three subspecies are recognised. It is native to the Albertine Rift montane forests and East African montane forests.

== Description ==
The male golden-winged sunbird is about 9 in (23 cm) long and the female is about 6 in (15 cm) long, the male having long central tail feathers. Yellow-edged feathers in the wings and tail are key identification pointers in all plumages of both the male and female. Body feathers of the male in breeding condition are a conspicuous metallic reddish-copper colour, which are mostly replaced by dull-black feathers in the non-breeding condition. The underparts of the male are brownish-black. The female is olive above and yellowish below. Immature are similar to females, except their underparts are darker.

== Taxonomy ==
yellow : sp. reichenowi green : sp.shellyae yellow cross-hatched red : sp.reichenowi + sp. lathburyi

German naturalist Gustav Fischer described the golden-winged sunbird in 1884, its species name honouring Anton Reichenow. It is classified as the only species in the genus Drepanorhynchus or sometimes in the genus Nectarinia.

Three subspecies are recognised. The nominate subspecies is found in southern and western Uganda into Kenya (including Mt Kilimanjaro) and Tanzania, subspecies lathburyi is smaller and its plumage has a more red-metallic sheen and is found in more montane regions of Kenya from 1700 to 2300 m, and subspecies shellyae is found in the Democratic Republic of the Congo above 2100 m. Females of this subspecies have a grey rather than green crown.

== Distribution and habitat ==
The golden-winged sunbird is native to the Albertine Rift montane forests and East African montane forests, between altitudes of 1170 and 2300 m. It is found in forest verges and clearings, in cultivated areas, bamboo forest and tall grassland. The species is locally nomadic, following food supply.

== Behaviour ==
=== Feeding ===
Golden-winged sunbirds consume the nectar from flowers of the mint Leonotis nepetifolia flowers as their main food source, but they also feed infrequently on other flower species: Aloe graminicola and Leonotis mollissima during the breeding season, and also Crotalaria species including C. agatiflora, Erythrina abyssinica, Fuchsia species, Ipomoea batatas, Jacaranda mimosifolia, Phragmanthera dschallensis and other pea species. The golden-winged sunbird also eats insects such as beetles, flies, ants, bees and wasps and various larvae.

Territorial birds, golden-winged sunbirds defend patches of Leonotis nepetifolia flowers outside the breeding season in Kenya. This species flowers in July when little else is in flower. The concept of economic defendability, in which the defence of a resource has costs (such as energy expenditure and risk of injury) and benefits (priority access to the resource), explains the territorial behavior that golden-winged sunbirds exhibit.

Field studies in Kenya show that the sunbirds live in the highland areas in a geographical distribution similar to that of Leonotis. They are active during the daytime and spend their time sitting on perches, fighting for territorial defence, or foraging for nectar. The energetic costs of each activity the sunbirds exhibit during the day has been calculated. When the daily costs are compared to the extra nectar gained by defending a territory, territorial birds make a net energetic profit. Field studies show that territorial birds need to spend less time per day foraging to meet their daily energy requirements when the flowers contain more nectar. By defending a territory a bird excludes other nectar consumers and, therefore, increases the amount of nectar available in each flower. Sunbirds satisfy their energy demands more rapidly, saving foraging time and allowing them to spend the spare time sitting on perches, which is less energetically expensive than foraging. This saving has to be weighed against the cost of defence, so if there is more than enough nectar in the flowers then it is easier just to share the nectar with other birds. When there is a minimal amount of nectar, possibly due to a bad season, the birds increase their territoriality, except when the nectar levels are too low to support cost of defence.

Usually territories involve only a single resident individual. Occasionally, a female can coexist with a male on a large territory and participate in its defence. Such sharing may relate to a complex prolonged pattern of pair formation. Feeding territories may be defended by all age and sex classes of the golden-winged sunbirds, including juveniles. The birds defend their territories both intra-specifically and inter-specifically against all sunbird species in the area. The success of the defence depends in part on the dominance relationships of the intruding individual, where persistent individuals of larger bird species such as the bronzy sunbird may feed successfully. Territory sizes vary greatly, ranging from 6.7 to 2300 m^{2}, but each territory contains about the same number of flowers.

Sometimes, when a female golden-winged sunbird intrudes on a bronzy sunbird's territory, it performs a begging display by quivering its wings and spreading its tail. This causes the bronzy sunbird to tolerate the foraging of the golden-winged sunbird in its territory. Female sunbirds spread their feet apart on the stalk of a Leonotis plant and turn their bodies 90° to the stalk and fan their tail feathers to varying degrees.

== Status ==
The golden-winged sunbird has a large range and its total population has not been estimated; however, it is not thought to be endangered and it is evaluated as Least Concern on the IUCN Red List.

== Gallery ==
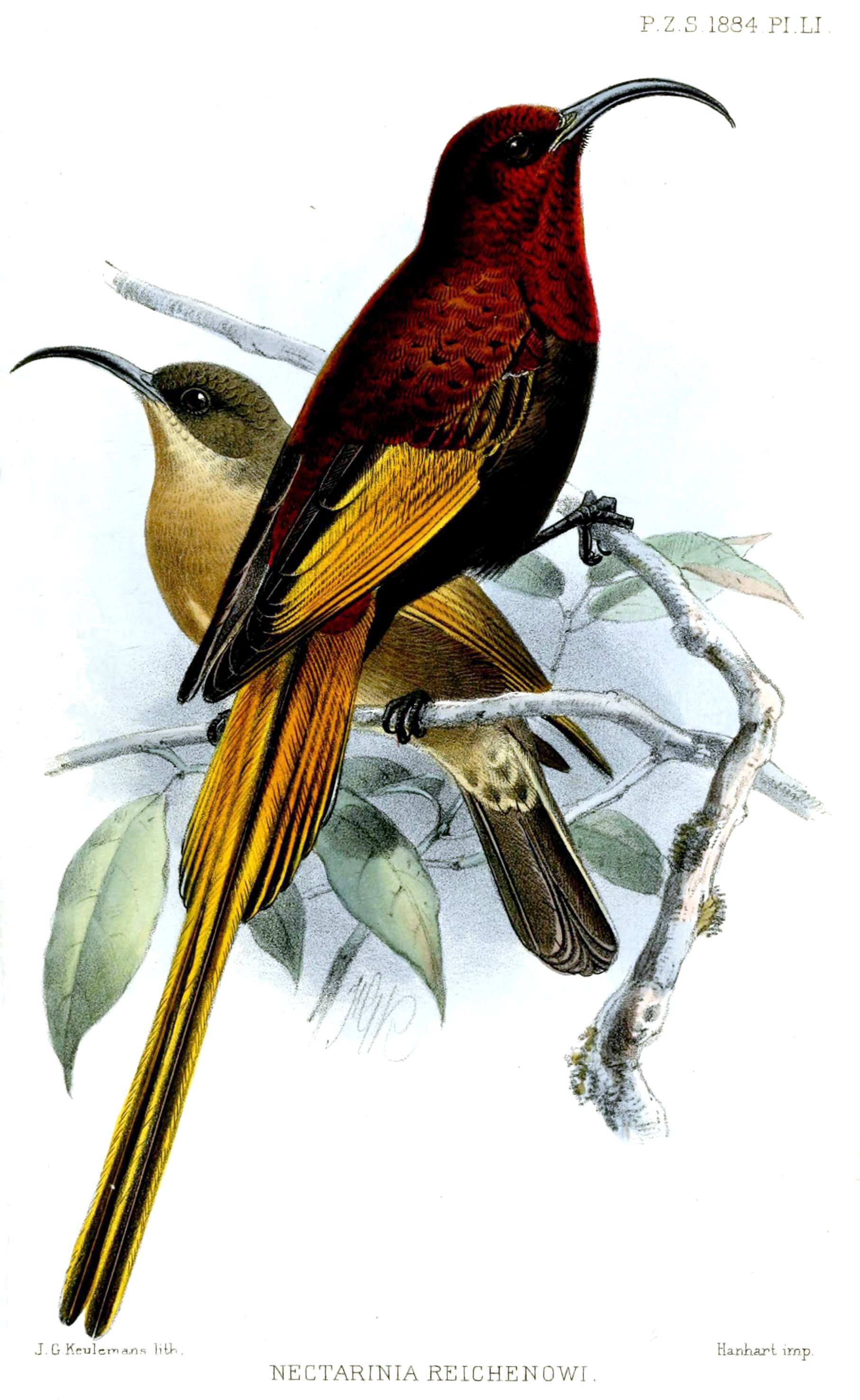
Painting showing male and female by Keulemans, 1884
