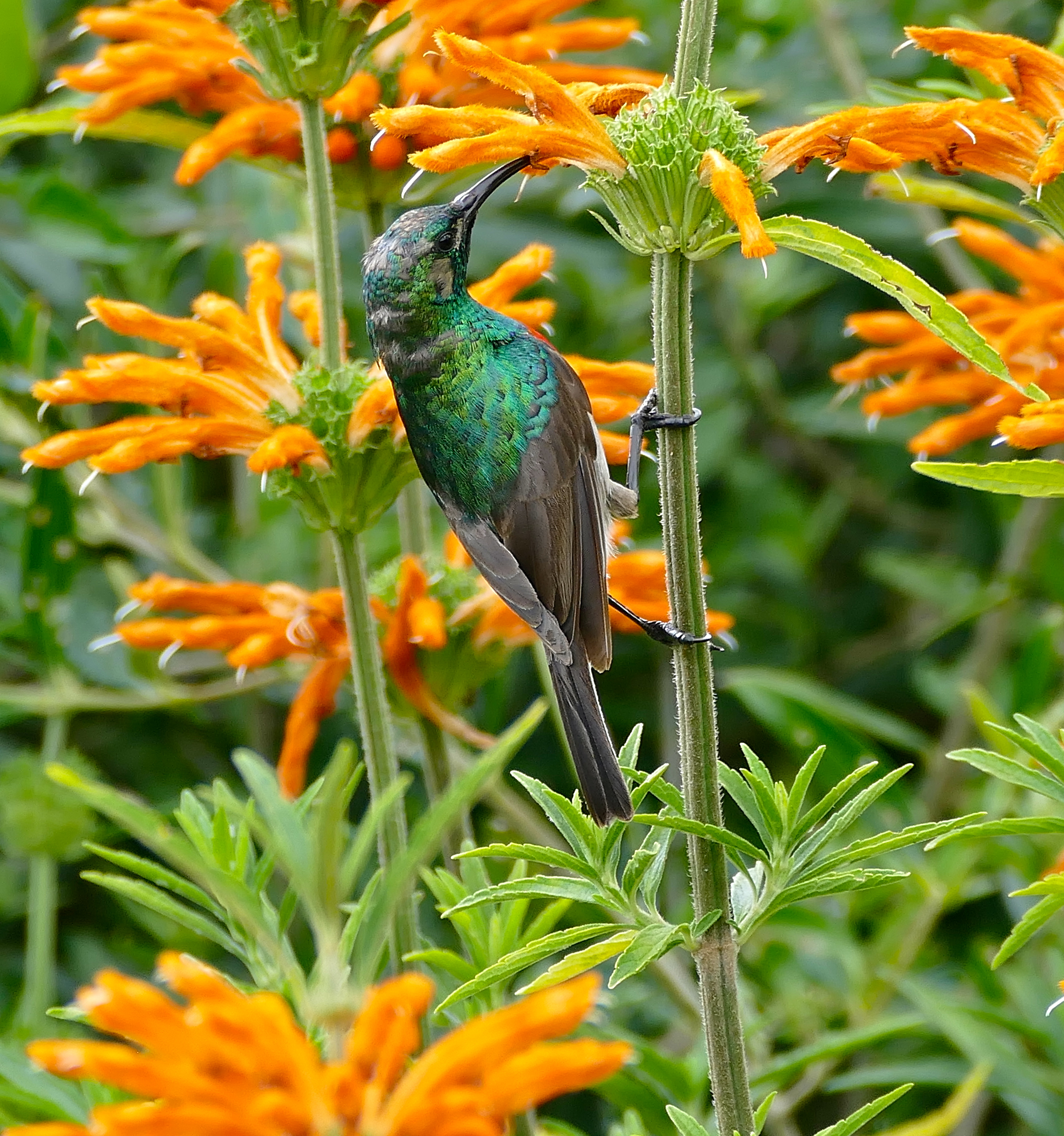
- At Boulders Beach, with a southern double-collared sunbird collecting nectar

Scientific classification
- Kingdom: Plantae
- Clade: Embryophytes
- Clade: Tracheophytes
- Clade: Angiosperms
- Clade: Eudicots
- Clade: Asterids
- Order: Lamiales
- Family: Lamiaceae
- Genus: Leonotis
- Species: L. leonurus

Binomial name
- Leonotis leonurus (L.) R.Br.

= Leonotis leonurus =

Species of plant

Leonotis leonurus, also known as wild dagga and lion's ear, is a plant species in the mint family Lamiaceae. It is a broadleaf evergreen shrub, native to South Africa, where it is very common, with a wide altitudinal range from 5 m up to 1980 m. It is known to have medicinal and sedating properties. The main psychoactive component of Leonotis leonurus is hypothesized to be either leonurine or a mixture of labdane-type compounds; Leonotis leonurus has been confirmed to contain leonurine according to peer reviewed journal published phytochemical analysis. Like other plants in the mint family, it also contains marrubiin. The word "dagga" comes from Afrikaans, and derives in turn from the Khoikhoi "dachab". The word "dagga" has been extended to include the genus Cannabis in Afrikaans and South African English, so the use of "wild" serves to distinguish Leonotis from Cannabis.

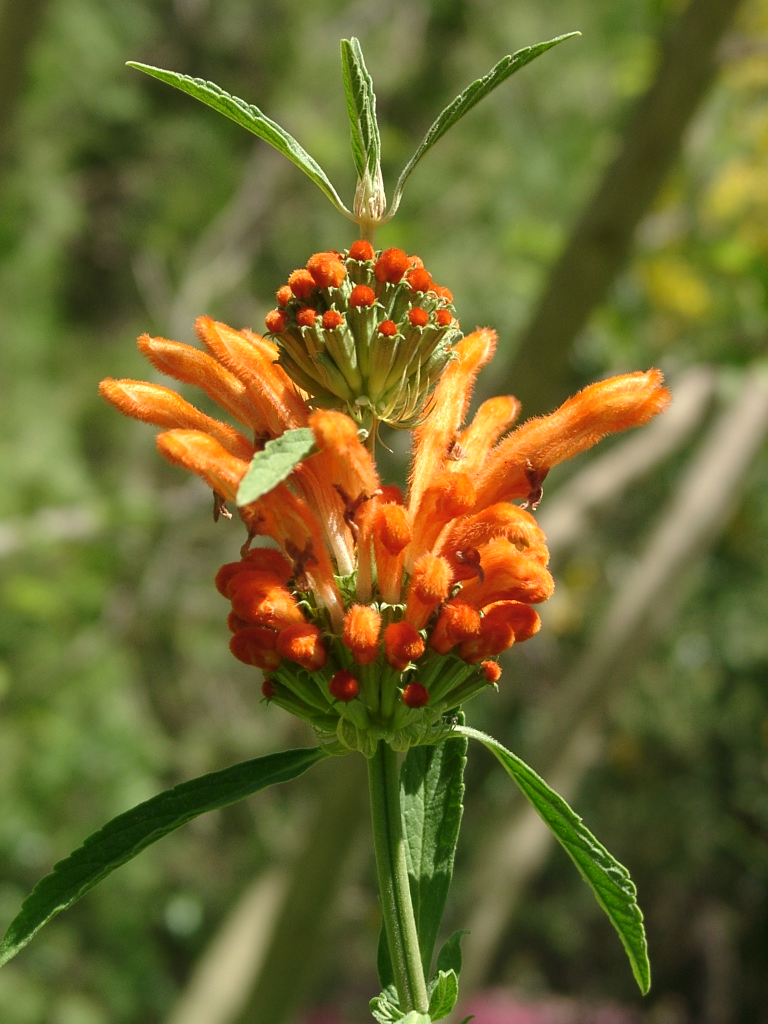

== Description ==
The shrub grows 2 to 3 metres (7 to 10 ft) tall (rarely to 4 m (13 ft)), and 1.5 m (5 ft) wide, with softly woody stems. The leaves are medium-dark green, 5–10 centimetres (2–4 in) long, and aromatic when crushed. The plant has hairy tubular 4–5 cm orange flowers, 3–11 together in tiered whorls (verticillasters) typical of the mint family, that encircle the square stems. They rise up to 0.9 m (2 ft 11 in) above the foliage, with flowering in summer (November to January) in some areas, but autumn to winter (April to June) in other areas.

=== Variation in flower colour ===
A white-flowered variety Leonotis leonurus var. albiflora was described by George Bentham, but is not now accepted as distinct at varietal rank; yellow cultivars also exist.

=== Ecology ===
The native habitat of Leonotis leonurus is among rocks and in grasslands of southern Africa, particularly in wetter eastern and southern areas. It attracts nectivorous birds (mainly sunbirds), as well as various insects such as bees and butterflies. The flowers' mainly orange to orange-red colour and tubular shape are indicative of its co-evolution with African sunbirds, which have curved bills suited to feeding from tubular flowers. The butterfly Cacyreus lingeus (Lycenidae) uses the foliage as a larval food plant.

== Cultivation ==
Leonotis leonurus is cultivated as an ornamental plant for its copious orange blossom spikes, and is used as specimen shrub or a screen in gardens and parks. It is moderately drought tolerant, and a nectar source for birds and butterflies in landscape settings. It was introduced to Europe in the 1600s.

Lion's ear can be found introduced as an ornamental plant in other subtropical and Mediterranean climate regions beyond South Africa, such as California, Hawaii, and Australia where it has naturalised in some areas. In cooler climates it is used as an annual and winter conservatory plant.

== Pharmacology and toxicology ==
Marrubiin has both antioxidant and cardioprotective properties and has shown to significantly improve myocardial function.

Docosatetraenoylethanolamide (DEA) is a cannabinoid that acts on the cannabinoid (CB_{1}) receptor which has been found in the whole flower extract of the putative variety Leonotis leonurus var. albiflora.

Leonotis leonurus contains several labdane diterpene–based compounds such as Hispanolone, Leonurun, Leonurine and Leoleorins. C-N

Leonurine (also known as SCM-198 in research) is a pseudoalkaloid that has been isolated from Leonotis leonurus, Leonotis nepetifolia, Leonurus japonicus, Leonurus cardiaca (motherwort), Leonurus sibiricus, as well as other plants of family Lamiaceae. Leonurine is easily extracted into water. One experimental animal study suggests that the aqueous leaf extract of Leonotis leonurus possesses antinociceptive, antiinflammatory, and hypoglycemic properties.

An animal study in rats indicated that in high doses, lion's ear has significant toxicological adverse effects on organs, red blood cells, white blood cells, and other important bodily functions. Acute toxicity tests in animals caused death for those receiving a 3200 mg/kg dose. A 1600 mg/kg dose of whole plant extract led to changes in red blood cells, haemoglobin concentration, mean corpuscular volume, platelets, and white blood cells.

== Traditional uses ==
Infusions made from flowers, seeds, leaves, or stems are widely used to treat tuberculosis, jaundice, muscle cramps, high blood pressure, diabetes, viral hepatitis, dysentery, and diarrhoea. The leaves, roots, and bark are used as an emetic for snakebites, and bee and scorpion stings. The fresh stem juice is used as an infusion drink for "blood impurity" in some parts of South Africa.

== Legal status ==
=== Latvia ===
Leonotis leonurus has been illegal in Latvia since November 2009, and is classified as a Schedule 1 drug. Possession of quantities up to 1 gram are fined up to 280 euros. Possession and distribution of larger quantities can be punished with up to 15 years in prison.

=== Poland ===
Leonotis leonurus was banned in Poland in March 2009. Possession and distribution lead to criminal charges.

== See also ==
- Leonurine
- Leonurus cardiaca
- Leonurus japonicus
- Leonotis nepetifolia
- Leonurus sibiricus

== See also ==
- List of Lamiaceae of South Africa
