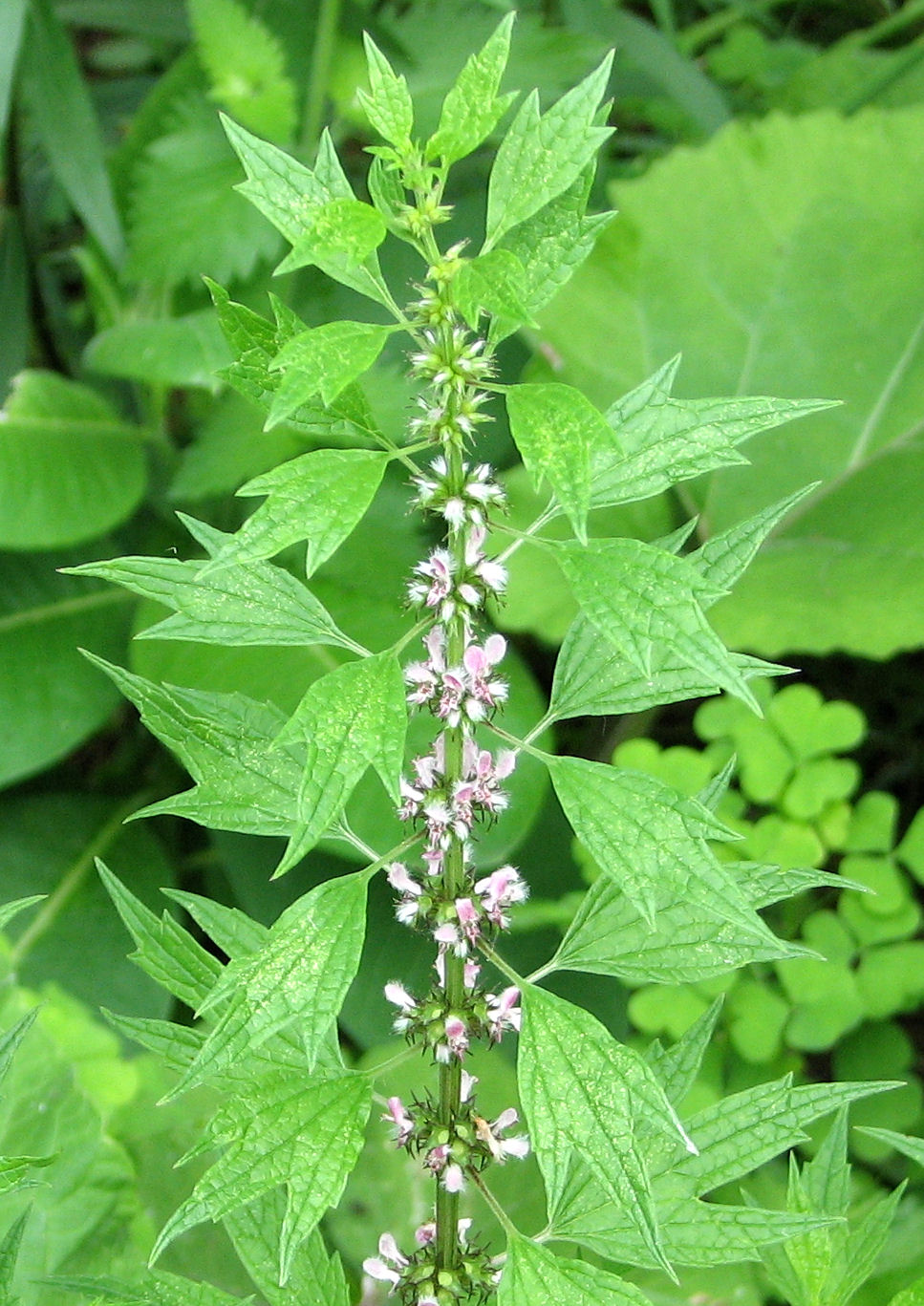

Scientific classification
- Kingdom: Plantae
- Clade: Tracheophytes
- Clade: Angiosperms
- Clade: Eudicots
- Clade: Asterids
- Order: Lamiales
- Family: Lamiaceae
- Genus: Leonurus
- Species: L. cardiaca

Binomial name
- Leonurus cardiaca L.

= Leonurus cardiaca =

Species of plant

Leonurus cardiaca, known as motherwort, is an herbaceous perennial plant in the mint family, Lamiaceae. Other common names include throw-wort, lion's ear, and lion's tail. Lion's tail is also a common name for Leonotis leonurus, and lion's ear, a common name for Leonotis nepetifolia. Originally from Central Asia and southeastern Europe, it is now found worldwide, spread largely due to its use as an herbal remedy.

== Description ==
Leonurus cardiaca has a squarish stem which is clad in short hairs and is often purplish, especially near the nodes. The opposite leaves have serrated margins and are palmately lobed with long petioles; basal leaves are wedge shaped with three points while the upper leaves have three to five. They are slightly hairy above and greyish beneath. Flowers appear in leaf axils on the upper part of the plant and have three-lobed bracts. The calyx of each flower is bell-shaped and has five lobes. The corolla is irregular, 8 to 12 mm (0.3 to 0.5 in) long, fused, long-tubed with two lips. The upper lip is convex and covered with white hairs and the lower lip is three-lobed and downward-curving and spotted with red. The flowers are pink to lilac in colour often with furry lower lips. There are four protruding stamens, two short and two longer, and the fruit is a four-chambered schizocarp. The plant grows to about 60 to 100 cm (24 to 39 in) in height and blooms in mid to late summer.

== Distribution and habitat ==
Motherwort is probably native to the southeastern part of Europe and central Asia where it has been cultivated since ancient times. Its natural habitat is beside roadsides, in vacant fields, waste ground, rubbish dumps and other disturbed areas. This plant prefers well drained soil and a partly shady location. Introduced to North America as a bee foraging plant and to attract bumble bees, this perennial herb is now considered invasive. It is hardy in USDA climate zones 4–8.

== Folklore ==
Nicholas Culpeper considered motherwort useful for removing melancholy vapors from the heart, improving cheerfulness, and settling the wombs of mothers. In 15th century Europe, motherwort was considered by some herbalists to protect against evil spirits.

== Chemistry ==
Chemical structure of stachydrine

The herb contains the alkaloid leonurine. Among other chemical constituents, it also contains stachydrine, bitter iridoid glycosides (leonuride), diterpenoids, flavonoids (including rutin and quercetin), tannins, volatile oils, and vitamin A. Stachydrine is extracted from the leaves of motherwort and has demonstrated various bioactivities for the treatment of fibrosis, cardiovascular diseases, cancers, uterine diseases, brain injuries, and inflammation.
