= Leonurine =

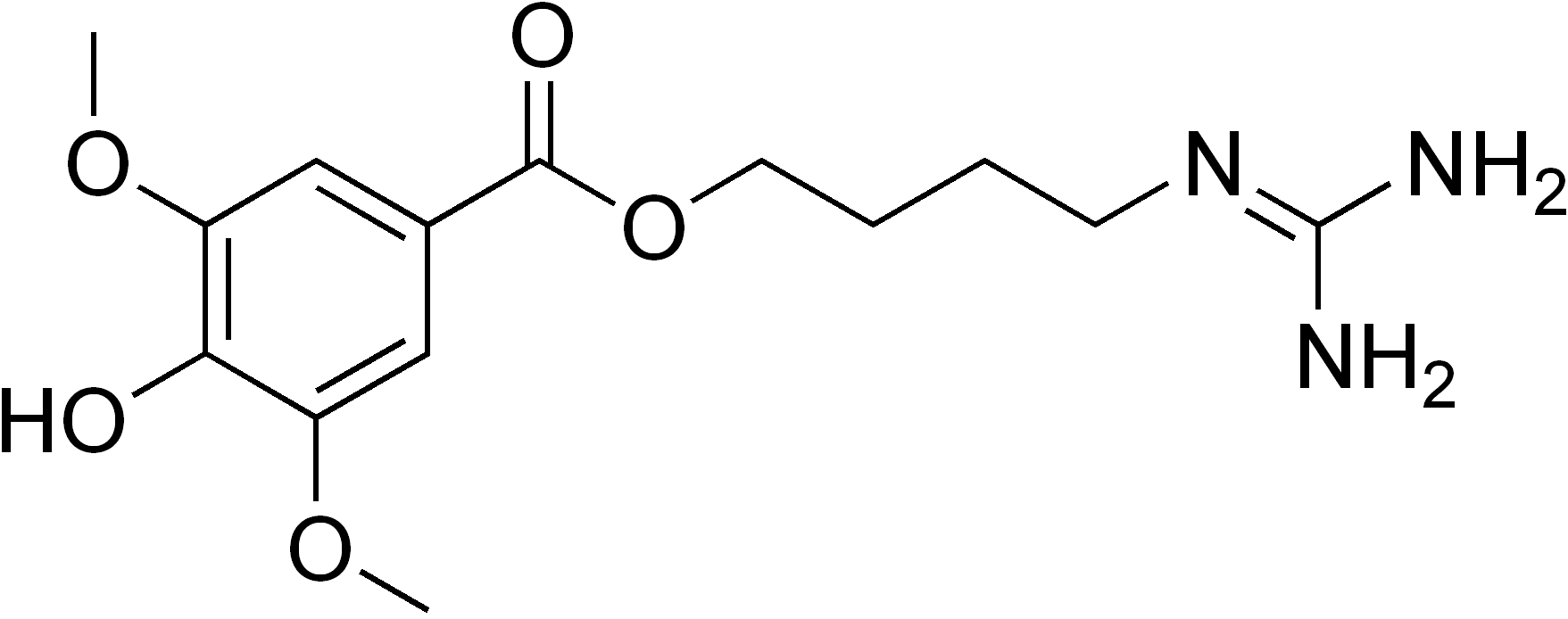

Names
- IUPAC name 4-(Diaminomethylideneamino)butyl 4-hydroxy-3,5-dimethoxybenzoate

Identifiers
CAS Number	24697-74-3
3D model (JSmol)	Interactive image
ChemSpider	141828
ECHA InfoCard	100.208.686
KEGG	C16985
PubChem CID	161464
UNII	09Q5W34QDA
CompTox Dashboard (EPA)	DTXSID70179434
- InChI: InChI=1S/C14H21N3O5/c1-20-10-7-9(8-11(21-2)12(10)18)13(19)22-6-4-3-5-17-14(15)16/h7-8,18H,3-6H2,1-2H3,(H4,15,16,17) Key: WNGSUWLDMZFYNZ-UHFFFAOYSA-N; InChI=1/C14H21N3O5/c1-20-10-7-9(8-11(21-2)12(10)18)13(19)22-6-4-3-5-17-14(15)16/h7-8,18H,3-6H2,1-2H3,(H4,15,16,17) Key: WNGSUWLDMZFYNZ-UHFFFAOYAI
- SMILES: O=C(OCCCC/N=C(\N)N)c1cc(OC)c(O)c(OC)c1

Properties
Chemical formula	C_{14}H_{21}N_{3}O_{5}
Molar mass	311.338 g·mol^{−1}
- Except where otherwise noted, data are given for materials in their standard state (at 25 °C [77 °F], 100 kPa). verify (what is ?) Infobox references

Leonurine (also known as SCM-198 in research) is a substituted guanidine that has been isolated from Leonotis leonurus, Leonotis nepetifolia, Leonurus japonicus, Leonurus cardiaca (motherwort), Leonurus sibiricus, as well as other plants of family Lamiaceae. Leonurine is easily extracted into water.

== Research ==
Leonurine weakly binds to multiple GABA receptor sites including the GABA_{A} receptor. However, it shows much higher affinity as a 5-HT3A receptor antagonist. 5-HT3A antagonists have been shown to help prevent nausea and vomiting as well as the negative effects of serotonin in the gastrointestinal tract.

Leonurine can regulate a variety of functions including oxidative stress, inflammation, fibrosis, apoptosis, and metabolic disorder.

Leonurine has demonstrated antidepressant-like action and has been shown to increase levels of serotonin, noradrenaline, and dopamine in chronic mild stress studies on mice and inhibits the production of pro-inflammatory cytokines.

Leonurine has been investigated as a potential treatment for cardiovascular disorders. It protects against oxidative damage from ischemic stroke and demonstrates neuroprotective activity against focal cerebral ischemia brain injury induced on rats.

Leonurine protects mice from pneumonia induced by influenza A.

Leonurine has demonstrated anti-cancer activity in vitro and in animal studies.

== Metabolites ==
Metabolites of leonurine in rats dosed orally include leonurine-10-O-sulfate (the sulfate conjugate of leonurine), leonurine-10-O-β-D-glucuronide (the glucuronide metabolite of leonurine) and an O-demethylated leonurine analog that has not yet had its structure definitively confirmed.

== Chemical synthesis ==
Leonurine can be synthesized starting from eudesmic acid. Reaction with sulfuric acid produces syringic acid. Protection with ethyl chloroformate followed by reaction with thionyl chloride (SOCl_{2}) and then tetrahydrofuran yields 4-carboethoxysyringic acid 4-chloro-1-butyl ester. The chloride is then converted to an amino group via a Gabriel synthesis (with potassium phthalimide) followed by hydrazinolysis (Ing–Manske procedure). The final step is reaction of the amine with S-methylisothiourea hemisulfate salt.

Leonurine synthesis
