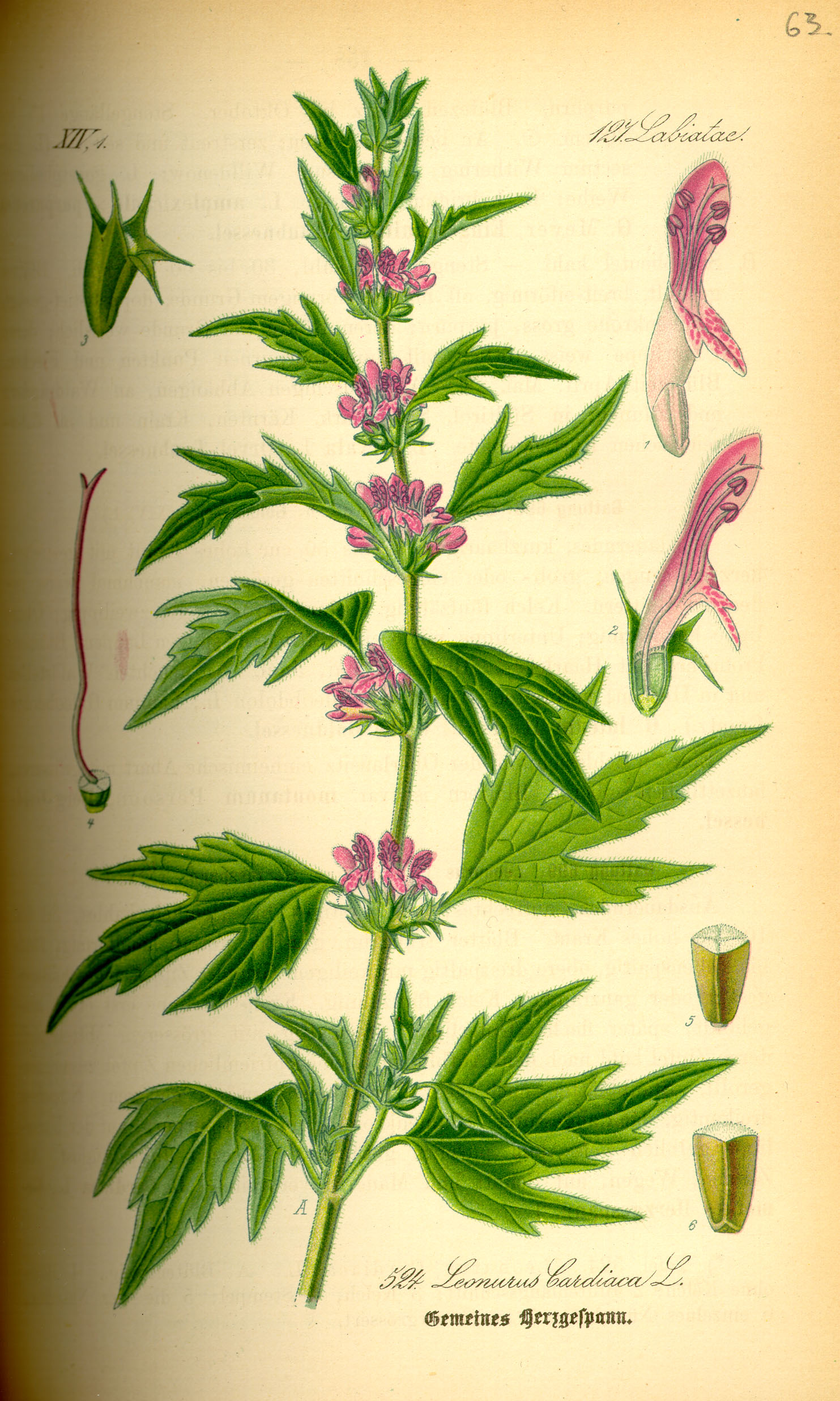
- Leonurus cardiaca

Scientific classification
- Kingdom: Plantae
- Clade: Embryophytes
- Clade: Tracheophytes
- Clade: Angiosperms
- Clade: Eudicots
- Clade: Asterids
- Order: Lamiales
- Family: Lamiaceae
- Subfamily: Lamioideae
- Genus: Leonurus; L.

Synonyms
- Cardiaca Mill.; Marrubiastrum Ség.

= Leonurus =

Genus of flowering plants

Leonurus (motherwort) is a genus of flowering plants in the family Lamiaceae. It is native to Europe and Asia, naturalized in New Zealand, Hawaii, New Caledonia, and much of North and South America.

Leonurus japonicus is one of the 50 fundamental herbs used in traditional Chinese medicine.

Species are sometimes confused with the related genus Leonotis.

Species

- Leonurus cardiaca L. – much of northern + central Europe east to Western Siberia + Iran
- Leonurus chaituroides C.Y.Wu & H.W.Li – southeastern China (Anhui, Hubei, Hunan)
- Leonurus deminutus V.I.Krecz. – Siberia, Mongolia, Inner Mongolia
- Leonurus glaucescens Bunge – Turkey, Caucasus, Ukraine, European Russia, western Siberia (Altai and Western Siberia), Mongolia, Kazakhstan, Uzbekistan, Inner Mongolia
- Leonurus incanus V.I.Krecz. & Kuprian. – Kazakhstan
- Leonurus japonicus Houtt. – Japan, Korea, Amur, Primorye, much of China (incl Taiwan, Tibet, Xinjiang), Himalayas, Southeast Asia, Queensland; naturalized in North + South America, West Indies, Hawaii, Cape Verde, etc.
- Leonurus kuprijanoviae Krestovsk. – Pakistan
- Leonurus macranthus Maxim. – Japan, Primorye, Manchuria
- Leonurus mongolicus V.I.Krecz. & Kuprian. – Mongolia, parts of Siberia (Tuva + Chita)
- Leonurus nuristanicus Murata – Afghanistan
- Leonurus oblongifolius Popov – Uzbekistan, Tajikistan, Kyrgyzstan
- Leonurus persicus Boiss. – Turkey, Iran, Caucasus
- Leonurus pseudomacranthus Kitag. – Japan, Amur, Primorye, eastern China
- Leonurus pseudopanzerioides Krestovsk. – Mongolia, Xinjiang
- Leonurus pubescens Benth. – Afghanistan, Pakistan, Nepal, western Himalayas
- Leonurus quinquelobatus Gilib. – Turkey, Iran, Caucasus, Crimea; naturalized in Germany, Belgium, Irkutsk
- Leonurus royleanus Benth. – western Himalayas
- Leonurus sibiricus L. – Mongolia, Siberia (Altai, Chita), China (Hebei, Nei Mongol, Shaanxi, Shanxi)
- Leonurus tataricus L. – Siberia (Altai, Tuva, Western Siberia, Irkutsk)
- Leonurus tibeticus Krestovsk. – Tibet
- Leonurus turkestanicus V.I.Krecz. & Kuprian. – western Himalayas, Tibet, Kyrgyzstan, Kazakhstan, Tajikistan, Turkmenistan, Uzbekistan, Iran
- Leonurus urticifolius C.Y.Wu & H.W.Li – Tibet
- Leonurus villosissimus C.Y.Wu & H.W.Li – China (Hebei)
- Leonurus wutaishanicus C.Y.Wu & H.W.Li – China (Shanxi)
