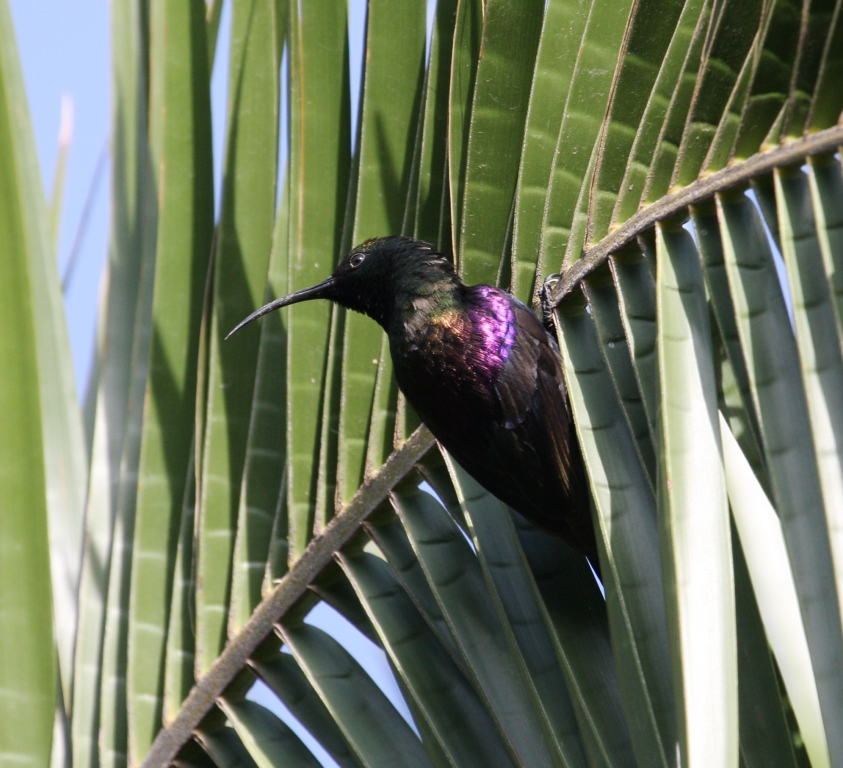
- Tacazze sunbird (Nectarinia tacazze)

Scientific classification
- Kingdom: Animalia
- Phylum: Chordata
- Class: Aves
- Order: Passeriformes
- Family: Nectariniidae
- Genus: Nectarinia; Illiger, 1811

Type species
- Certhia famosa Linnaeus, 1766

Species
- See text

= Nectarinia =

Genus of birds

Nectarinia is a genus of birds in the sunbird family, Nectariniidae. What species belong to it has been highly contentious for many decades. Towards the late 20th century, the dominant trend was to use it to group all "typical" sunbirds. More recently taxonomists have divided the Nectarinia into eight genera which are now considered distinct from Nectarinia: Leptocoma, Anabathmis, Chalcomitra, Cinnyris, Cyanomitra, Dreptes, Anthobaphes, and Drepanorhynchus.

== Taxonomy ==
The genus Nectarinia was introduced in 1811 by the German zoologist Johann Karl Wilhelm Illiger. The type species was designated as Certhia famosa Linnaeus, 1766 by George Gray in 1840.

== Species ==
The genus now contains six species:

Image	Common name	Scientific name	Distribution
	Bocage's sunbird	Nectarinia bocagii	Angola and the Democratic Republic of the Congo
	Purple-breasted sunbird	Nectarinia purpureiventris	Albertine Rift montane forests
	Tacazze sunbird	Nectarinia tacazze	Eritrea, Ethiopia, Kenya, South Sudan, Tanzania, and Uganda.
	Bronze sunbird	Nectarinia kilimensis	Angola, Burundi, Democratic Republic of the Congo, Ethiopia, Kenya, Malawi, Rwanda, Tanzania, Uganda, and Zambia
	Malachite sunbird	Nectarinia famosa	Ethiopia southwards to South Africa
	Scarlet-tufted sunbird	Nectarinia johnstoni	Democratic Republic of the Congo, Kenya, Malawi, Rwanda, Tanzania, Uganda, and Zambia.
