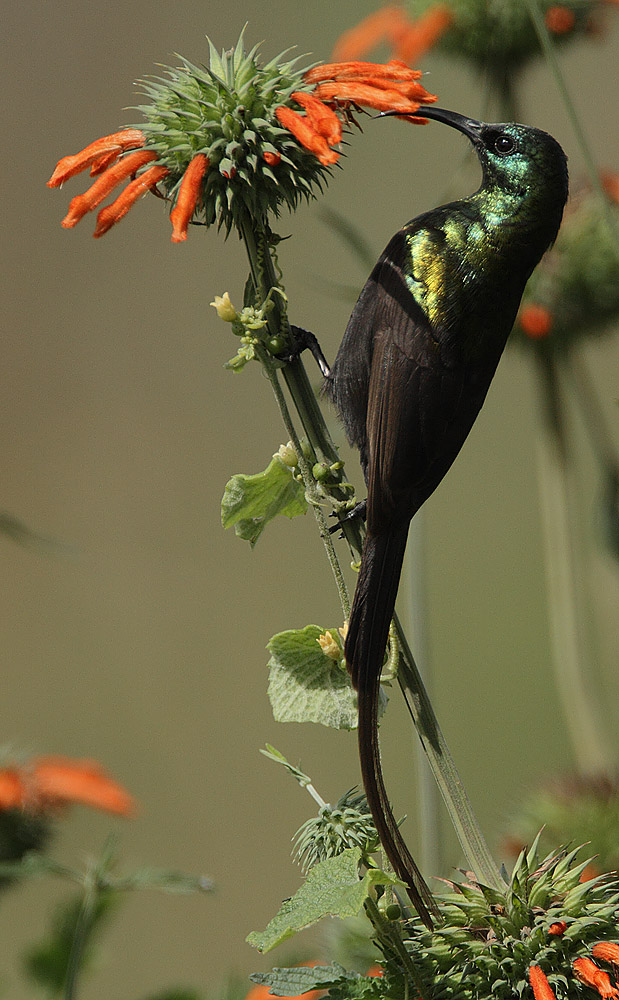
- Male feeding on Leonotis blossoms

Conservation status
- Least Concern (IUCN 3.1)

Scientific classification
- Kingdom: Animalia
- Phylum: Chordata
- Class: Aves
- Order: Passeriformes
- Family: Nectariniidae
- Genus: Nectarinia
- Species: N. kilimensis

Binomial name
- Nectarinia kilimensis Shelley, 1885

= Bronze sunbird =

Species of bird

The bronze sunbird (Nectarinia kilimensis) is a species of bird in the family Nectariniidae. It is native to the Bié Plateau (Angola) and eastern Afromontane forests.

== Description ==
Bronze sunbirds have a long, thin, well-curved bill. Males have bronze-and-green undertones but most often look black in light. While the male has the undertones, the female however has a pale eyebrow and an added yellowish park below the belly with fine streaking. On some subspecies specifically located in Angola there is a splash of odd green, but it does not overlap in range with malachite or scarlet-tufted sunbirds in similar areas which do not have this green streaking. Male sunbirds lack any purple tones to the plumage which is found on female species.

=== Vocalizations ===
Bronze sunbirds use a jumble of twittering notes followed by cleaner whistle sounds. These sounds are most often heard during the early morning and mid day.

== Distribution and habitat ==
The bronze sunbird can be found in Africa. While not very common they can be best found near the edges of the Afromontane forest, mountain sides and Zimbabwe's eastern highlands and adjacent next to Mozambique. Other countries they can be found include Angola, Burundi, Democratic Republic of the Congo, Ethiopia, Kenya, Malawi, Rwanda, Tanzania, Uganda, and Zambia. They stay far away from populated areas in these countries and have adapted to most remote environments. These environments include Savannas, dried shrub-land, grass, seasonally flooded areas, and rural gardens. They are most abundant in subtropical forests and brush-land.

== Behavior ==
=== Diet ===
The diet of the bronze sunbird is very specific limited to Nectar, Spiders and Insects. The insects that they consume include Ants, Coleoptera (beetles), Hemiptera (bugs), Hymenoptera (wasps, bees and ants), Diptera (flies), and termites.

=== Breeding ===
During the breeding process the male role is very limited. After conception the male often leaves. The female assumes most of the responsibility and lays its eggs anytime from September to May but the peak of egg laying is between the months of October to December. They often lay 1 to 2 eggs and after the eggs have hatched the new chicks are fed and brooded mainly by the female for a period of 16 to 21 days. After that period they continue to return to the nest for about a week longer, becoming fully independent about 2–3 weeks later. The nests that these chicks live in over this period of time are built by the female only and it takes her anywhere between 5 and 15 days before the chicks are born. The basket is made as an oval structure. They use pieces of ferns, bits of dry grass, shreds of bark, bracken, leaves, lichen and inflorescences, often secured down with spider web. The entrance to this nest is covered down by a small flap, and the interior is made of fine grass and plants. It is attached at the roof to a branch within a small patch of bushes or of a type of sap.

== Threats ==
The bronze sunbird is not threatened. It has benefited from the introduction of Protea farming, which is a poisonous flower grown and abundant in gardens in Zimbabwe. While odd, this flower, which is poisonous to humans, they do not affect the bronze sunbird and provides an immense amount of nectar which makes it a place that the sunbirds frequent often.
