= C7H13NO2 =

The molecular formula C_{7}H_{13}NO_{2} (molar mass: 143.19 g/mol) may refer to:

- Dimethylaminoethyl_acrylate
- N-(2-Hydroxypropyl)_methacrylamide
- Stachydrine
