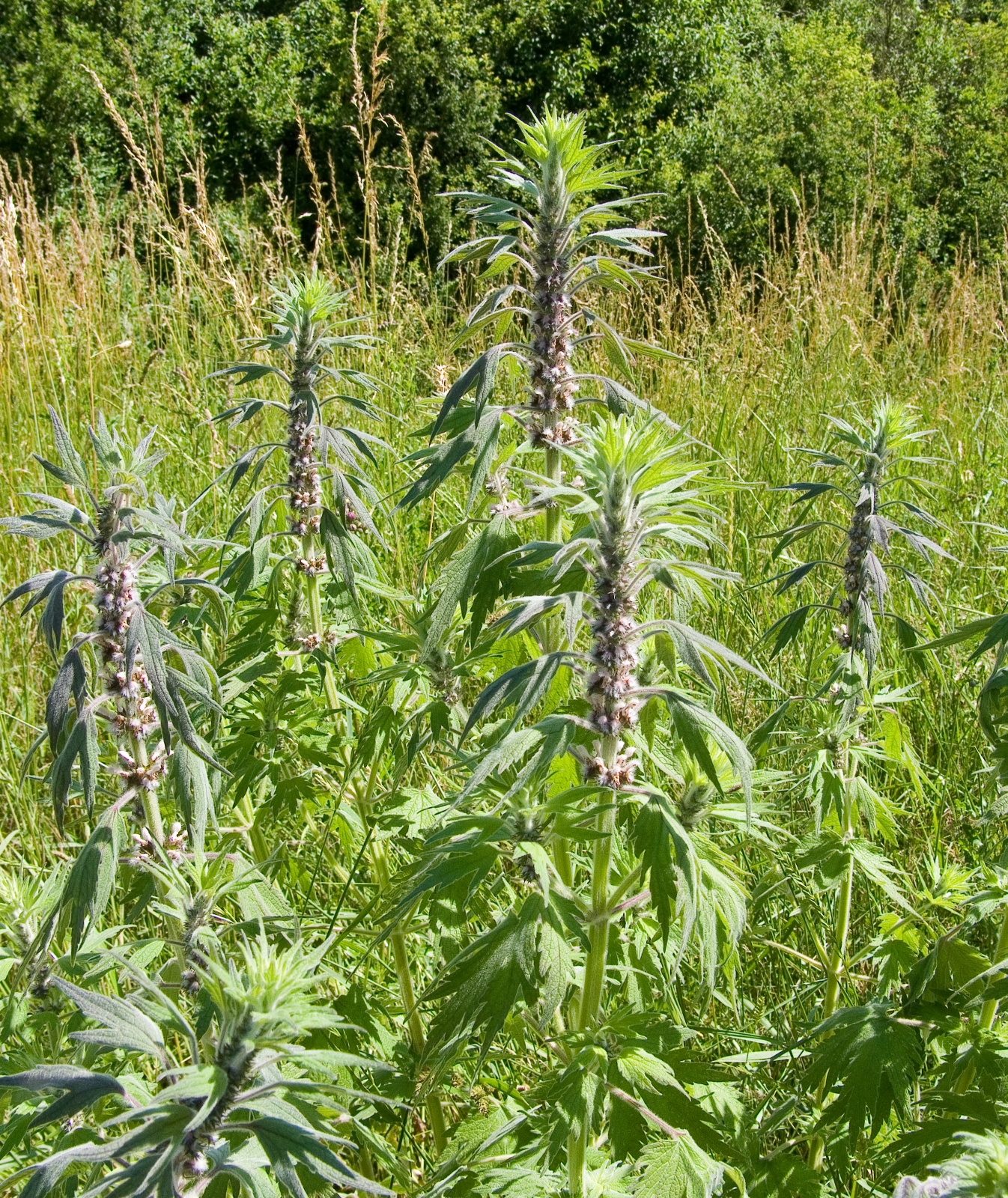

Scientific classification
- Kingdom: Plantae
- Clade: Tracheophytes
- Clade: Angiosperms
- Clade: Eudicots
- Clade: Asterids
- Order: Lamiales
- Family: Lamiaceae
- Genus: Leonurus
- Species: L. quinquelobatus

Binomial name
- Leonurus quinquelobatus Gilib. ex Usteri

Synonyms
- Cardiaca quinquelobata Gilib; Leonurus cardiaca subsp. villosus (Desf. ex d'Urv.) Hyl.; Leonurus villosus Desf. ex d'Urv.; Leonurus cardiaca var. canescens (Dumort.) T.Durand; Leonurus canescens Dumort., Fl. Belg.

= Leonurus quinquelobatus =

Species of flowering plant

Leonurus quinquelobatus is a herbaceous flowering plant native to Eurasia, where it is found from Sakhalin, Russia west to Italy and central Europe.
