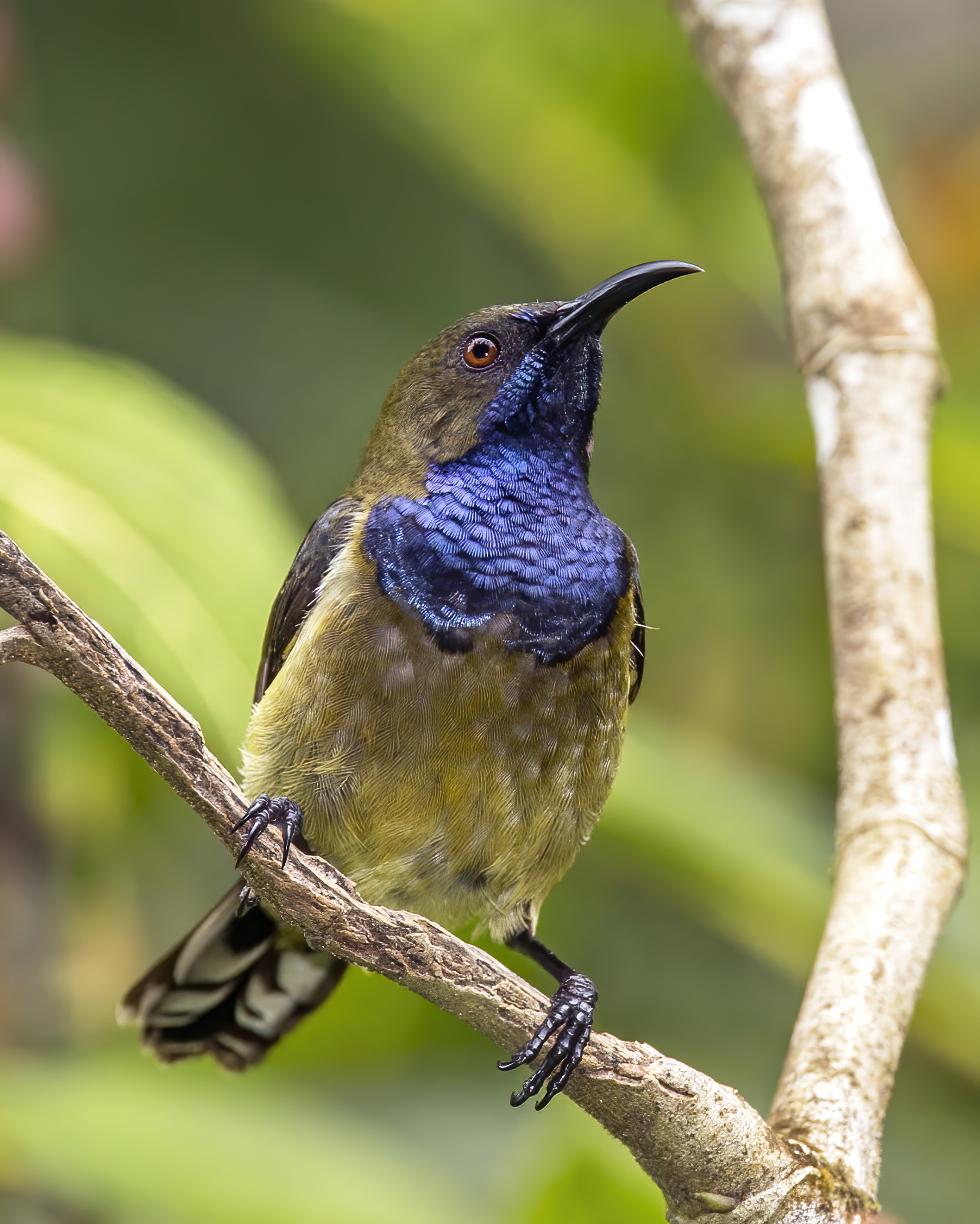
- Male
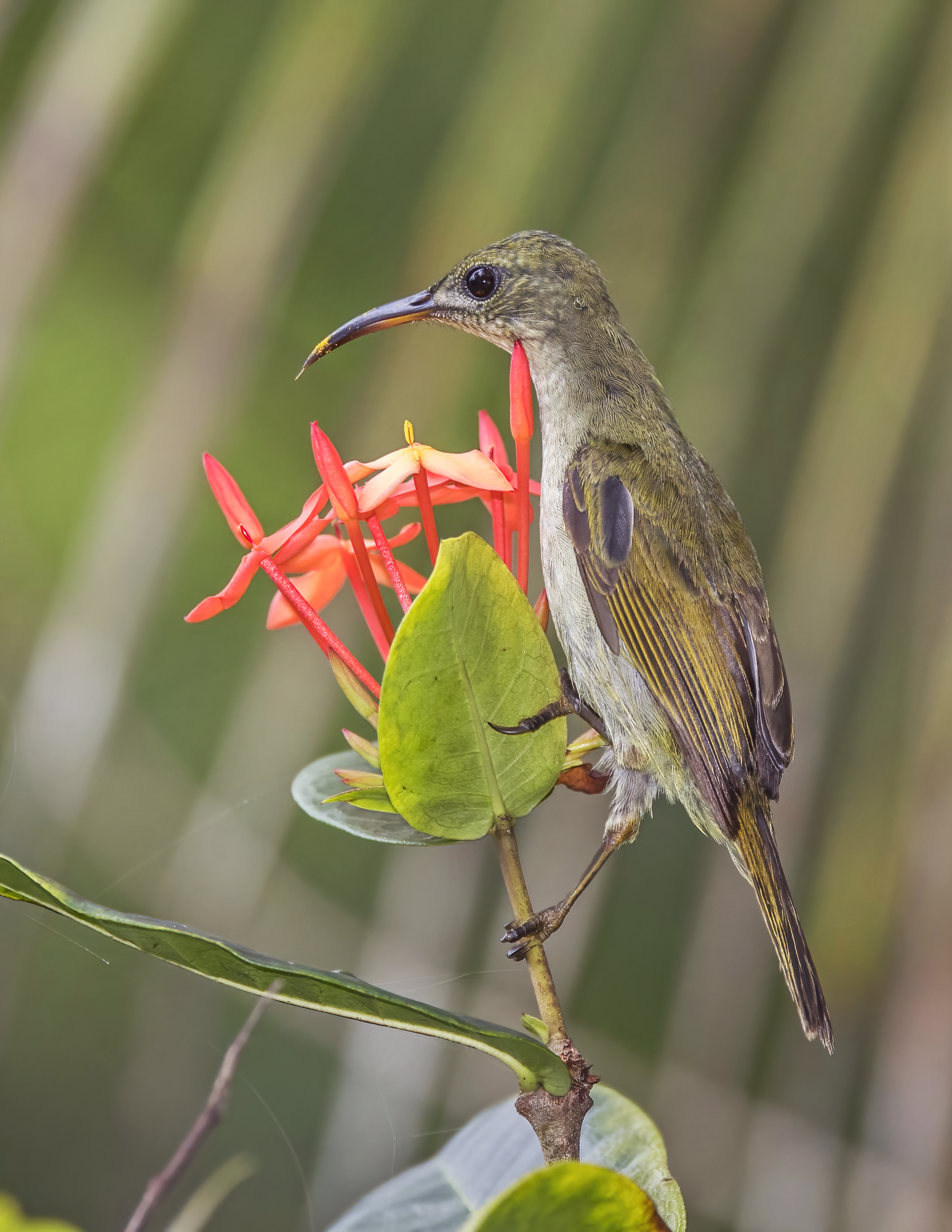
- Female both on Príncipe island

Conservation status
- Least Concern (IUCN 3.1)

Scientific classification
- Kingdom: Animalia
- Phylum: Chordata
- Class: Aves
- Order: Passeriformes
- Family: Nectariniidae
- Genus: Anabathmis
- Species: A. hartlaubii

Binomial name
- Anabathmis hartlaubii (Hartlaub, 1857)
- range

Synonyms
- Nectarinia hartlaubii Hartlaub, 1857

= Príncipe sunbird =

Species of bird

The Príncipe sunbird (Anabathmis hartlaubii) is a species of bird in the family Nectariniidae. It is endemic to the island of Príncipe, part of the country of São Tomé and Príncipe which lies off the west coast of Africa in the Gulf of Guinea.
