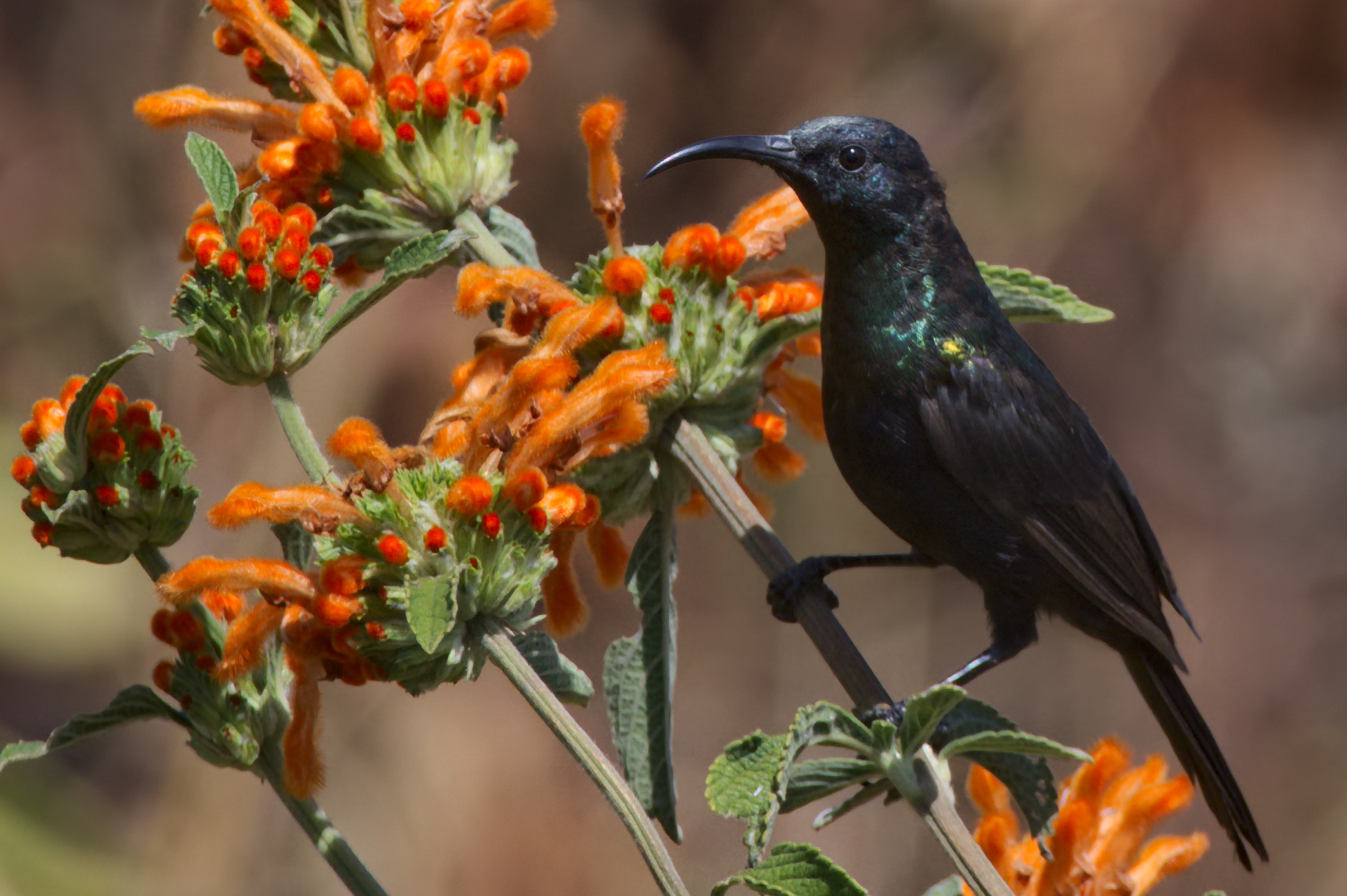
- Male in Angola

Conservation status
- Least Concern (IUCN 3.1)

Scientific classification
- Kingdom: Animalia
- Phylum: Chordata
- Class: Aves
- Order: Passeriformes
- Family: Nectariniidae
- Genus: Nectarinia
- Species: N. bocagii

Binomial name
- Nectarinia bocagii Shelley, 1879

= Bocage's sunbird =

Species of bird

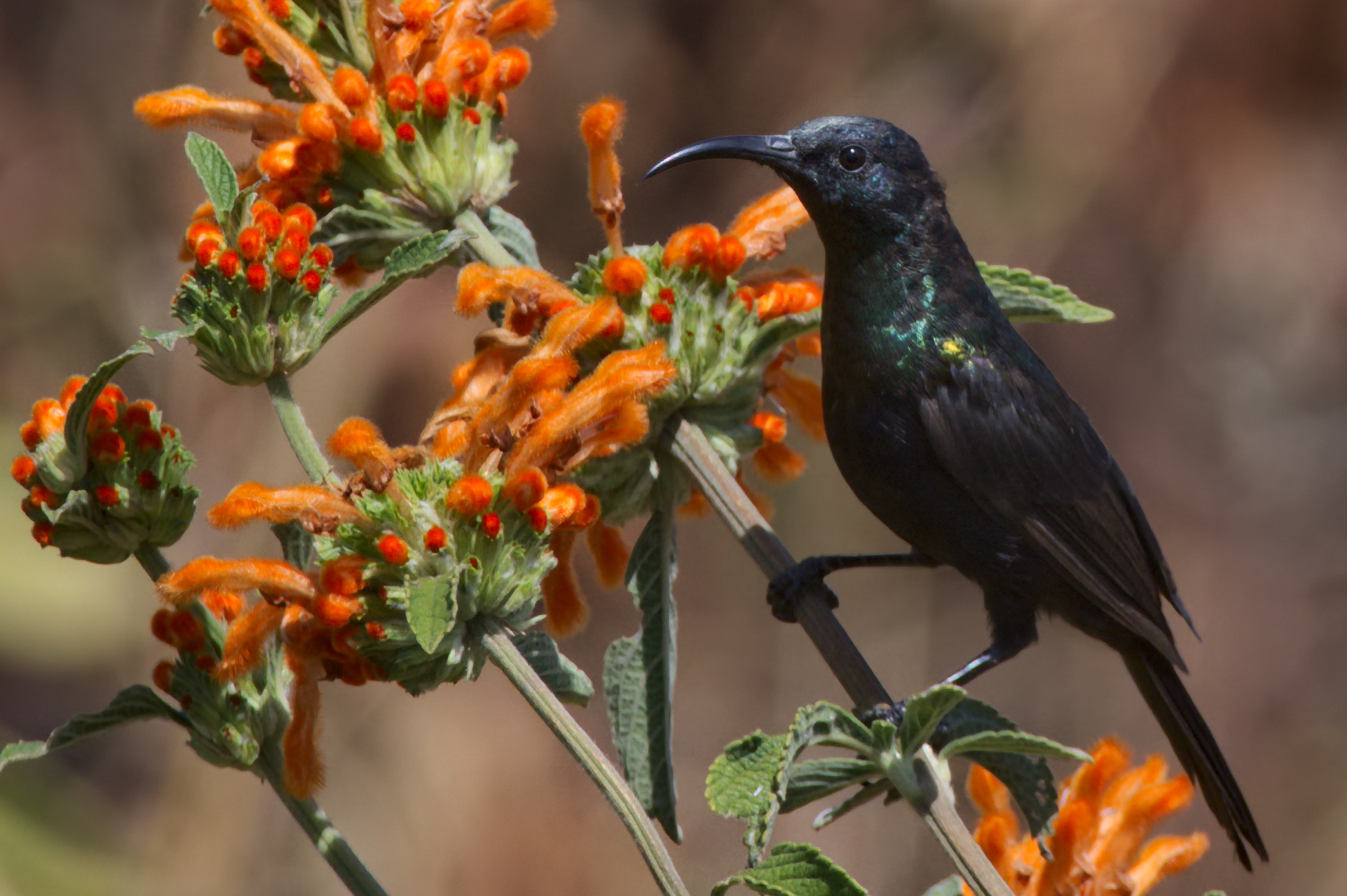
Nectarinia bocagii

Bocage's sunbird (Nectarinia bocagii) is a species of bird in the family Nectariniidae. It is present in the Bié Plateau (Angola) and southern DRC.

The common name and Latin binomial commemorate the Portuguese naturalist José Vicente Barbosa du Bocage.
