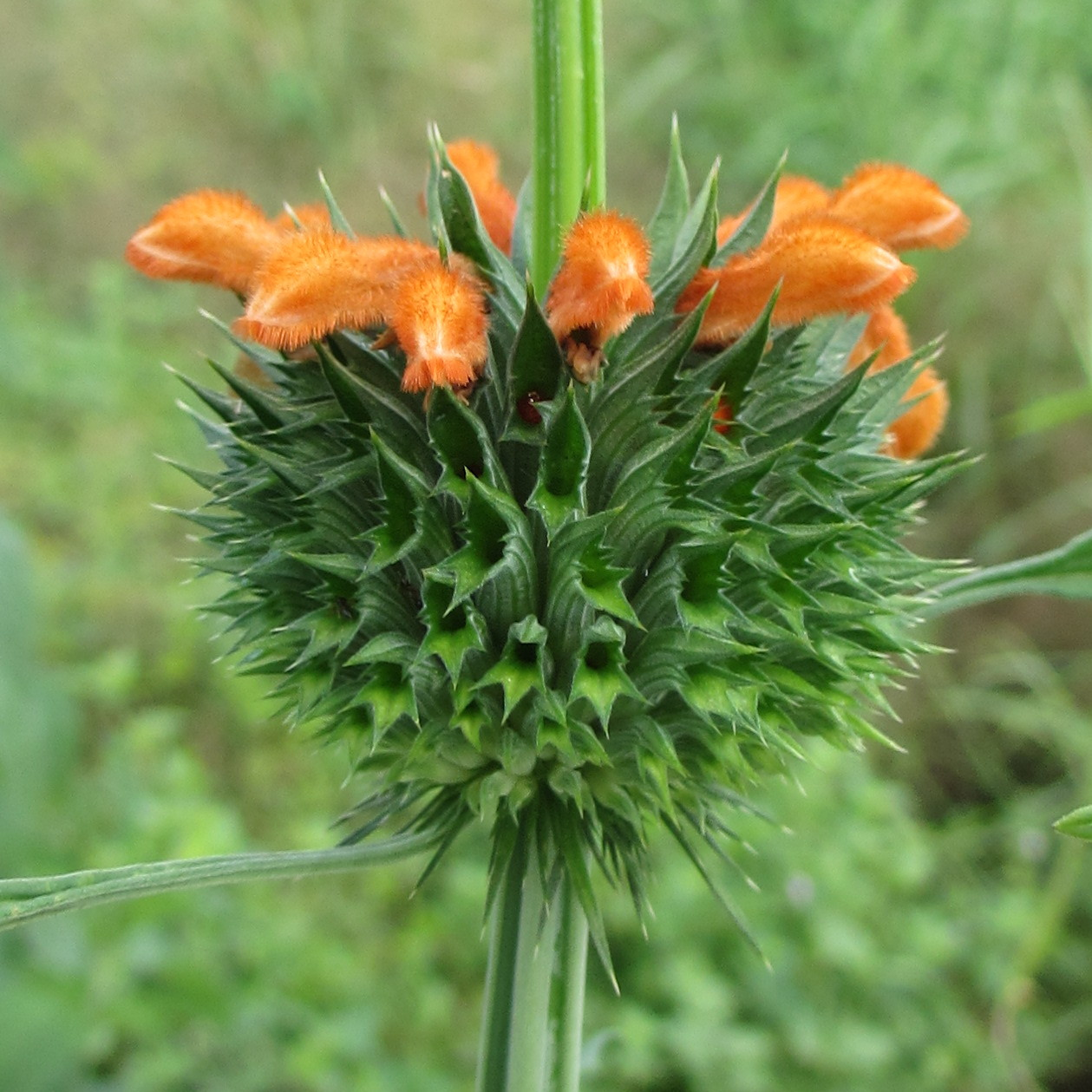

Scientific classification
- Kingdom: Plantae
- Clade: Tracheophytes
- Clade: Angiosperms
- Clade: Eudicots
- Clade: Asterids
- Order: Lamiales
- Family: Lamiaceae
- Genus: Leonotis
- Species: L. ocymifolia

Binomial name
- Leonotis ocymifolia (Burm.f.) Iwarsson, 1985

= Leonotis ocymifolia =

Species of plant

Leonotis ocymifolia, occasionally referred to as the minaret flower, is a flowering plant of the mint family, Lamiaceae. The plant is used in Ethiopian folk medicine (link misleading) and found in Eastern Africa spanning from Sudan to South Africa. The plant is reasonably drought-resistant and wind tolerant. Unlike the similar Leonotus leonuris, in the ocymifolia, the tubular flowers are bolder and larger.

== See also ==
- List of Lamiaceae of South Africa
