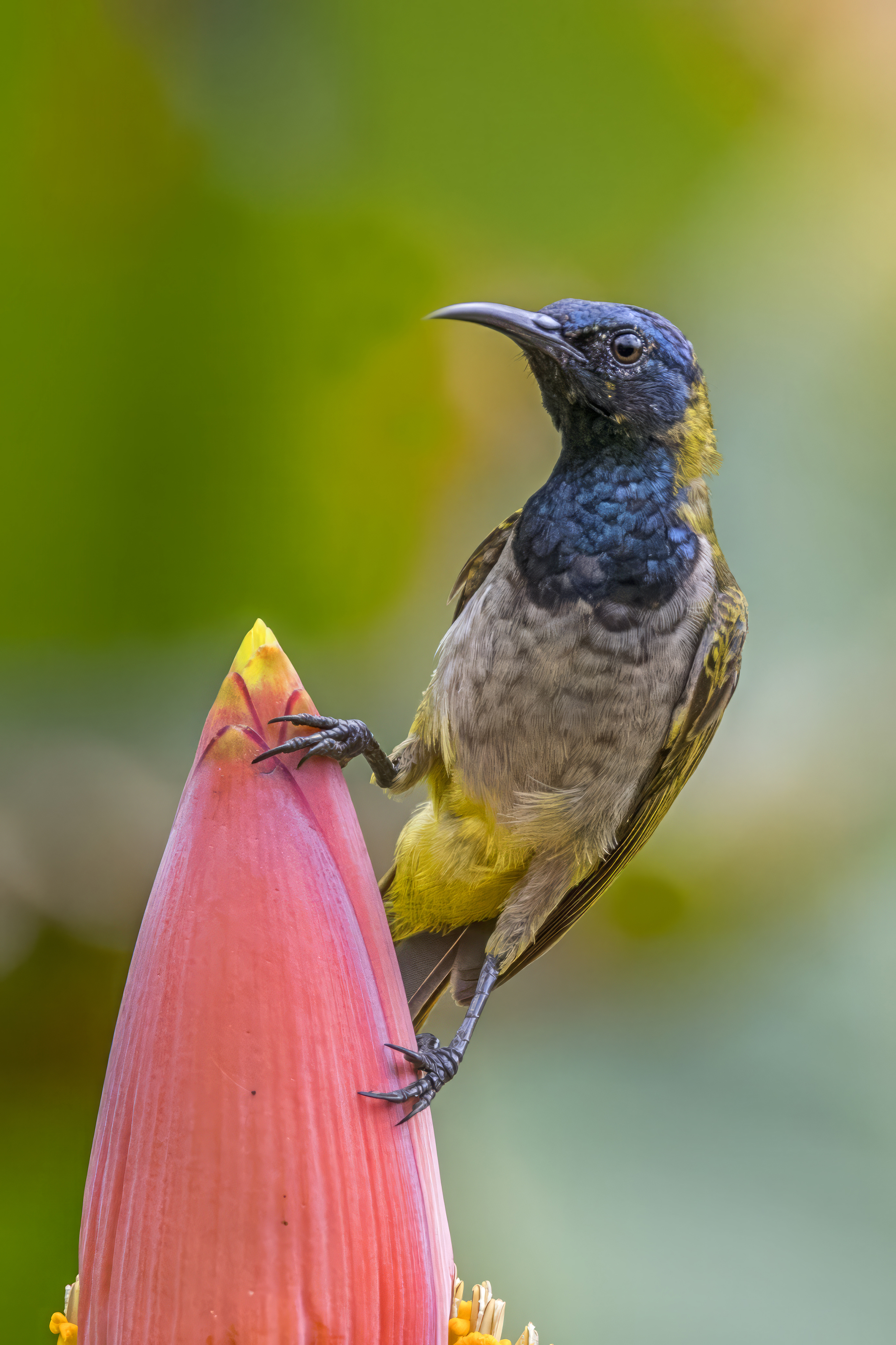
- Ankasa Forest Reserve, Ghana

Conservation status
- Least Concern (IUCN 3.1)

Scientific classification
- Kingdom: Animalia
- Phylum: Chordata
- Class: Aves
- Order: Passeriformes
- Family: Nectariniidae
- Genus: Anabathmis
- Species: A. reichenbachii

Binomial name
- Anabathmis reichenbachii (Hartlaub, 1857)

Synonyms
- Nectarinia reichenbachii

= Reichenbach's sunbird =

Species of bird

Reichenbach's sunbird (Anabathmis reichenbachii) is a species of bird in the family Nectariniidae. It is native to the African tropical rainforest.

The bird is named after the German botanist and zoologist Heinrich Ludwig Reichenbach.
