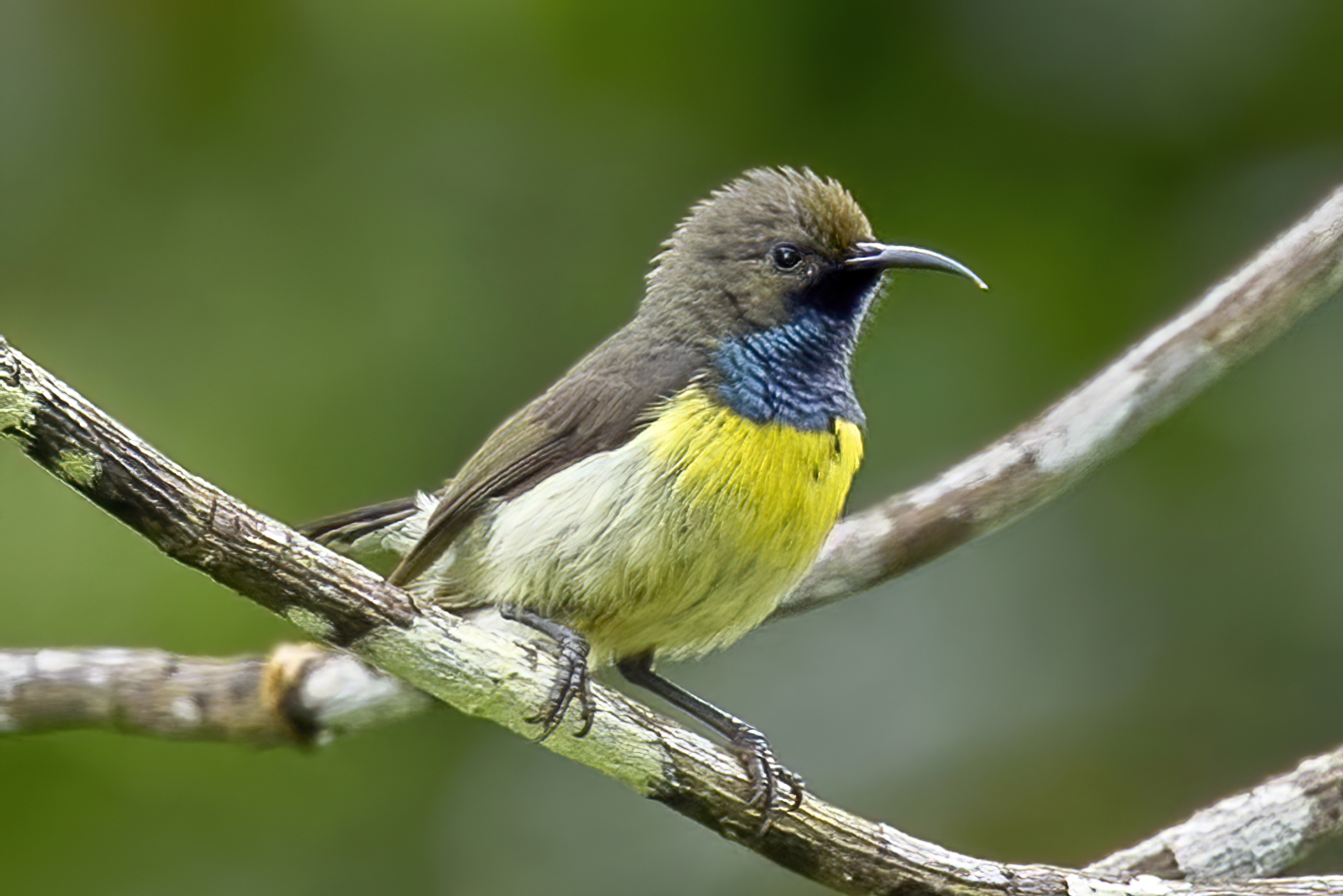
- Male
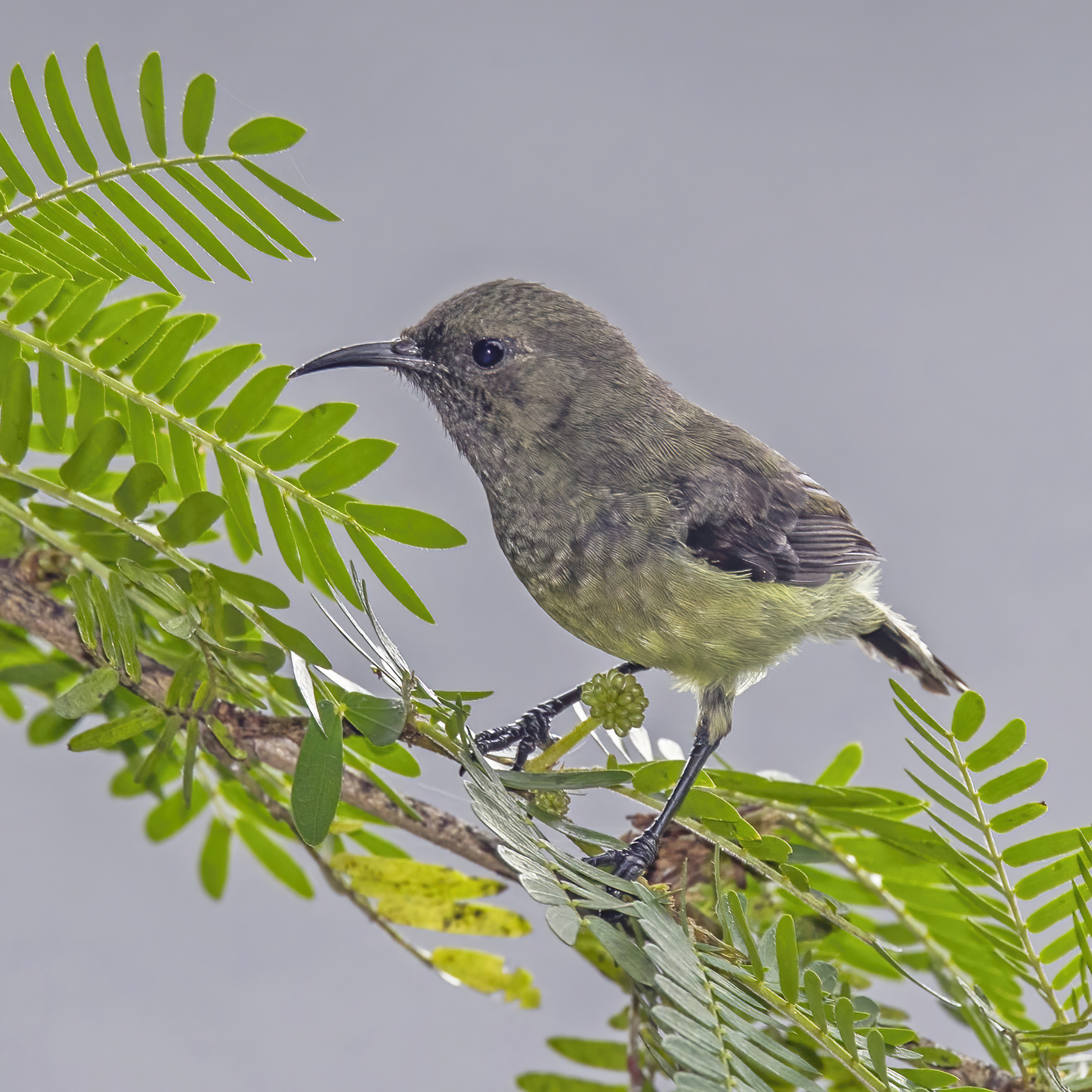
- Female both on São Tomé island

Conservation status
- Least Concern (IUCN 3.1)

Scientific classification
- Kingdom: Animalia
- Phylum: Chordata
- Class: Aves
- Order: Passeriformes
- Family: Nectariniidae
- Genus: Anabathmis
- Species: A. newtonii

Binomial name
- Anabathmis newtonii (Bocage, 1887)

Synonyms
- Nectarinia newtonii Bocage, 1887

= Newton's sunbird =

Species of bird

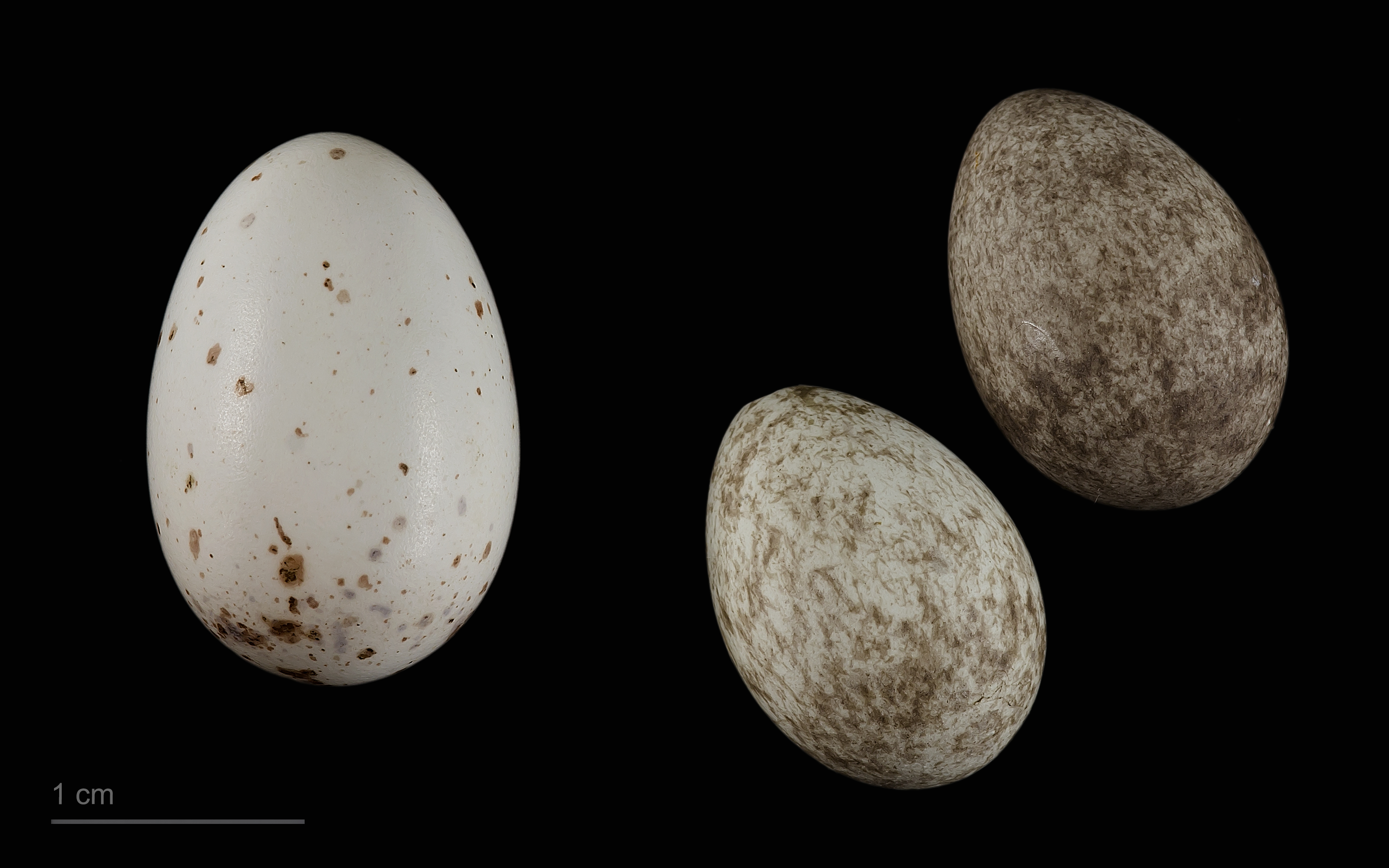
Chrysococcyx cupreus in a spawn of Anabathmis newtonii - MHNT

Newton's sunbird, or the São Tomé sunbird (Anabathmis newtonii) is a species of bird in the family Nectariniidae. It is endemic to São Tomé Island. It is one of the smallest sunbirds. In general, the bird has dark olive upperparts - the male has an iridescent green-purple throat and upper breast region, while females have a dull olive throat and yellowish underparts, but underparts in female youth do not develop into yellow until later sexual maturity.
