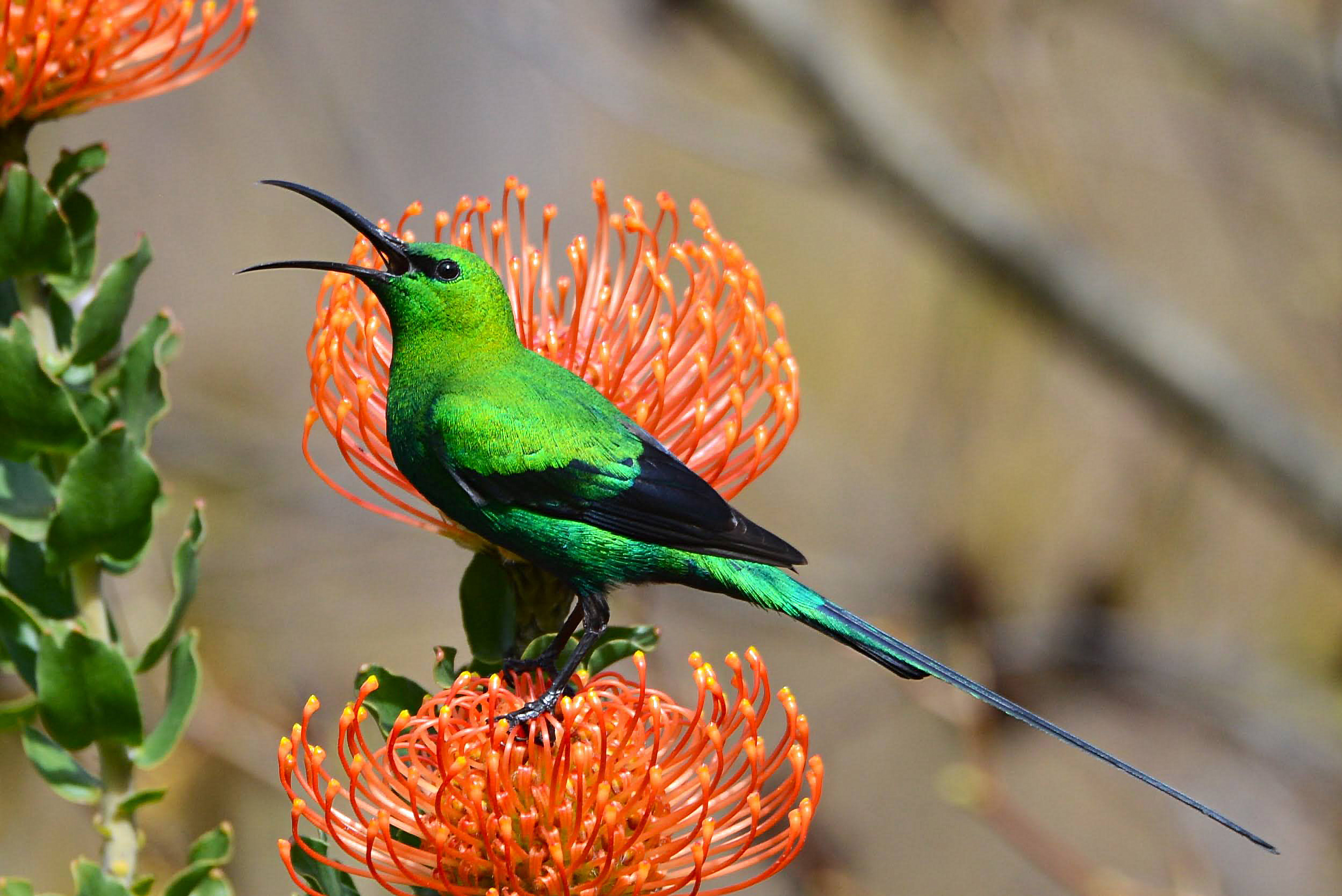
- Male in breeding plumage on pincushion protea

Conservation status
- Least Concern (IUCN 3.1)

Scientific classification
- Kingdom: Animalia
- Phylum: Chordata
- Class: Aves
- Order: Passeriformes
- Family: Nectariniidae
- Genus: Nectarinia
- Species: N. famosa

Binomial name
- Nectarinia famosa (Linnaeus, 1766)

Synonyms
- Certhia famosa Linnaeus, 1766

= Malachite sunbird =

Species of bird

The malachite sunbird (Nectarinia famosa) is a small nectarivorous bird found from the highlands of Ethiopia southwards to South Africa. They pollinate many flowering plants, particularly those with long corolla tubes, in the Fynbos.

== Taxonomy ==
The malachite sunbird was formally described in 1766 by the Swedish naturalist Carl Linnaeus in the twelfth edition of his Systema Naturae under the binomial name Certhia famosa. Linnaeus specified the type locality as the Cape of Good Hope in South Africa. He based his account on "Le grimpereau à longue queue du Cap de Bonne Espérance" that had been described and illustrated in 1760 by French zoologist Mathurin Jacques Brisson. The specific epithet is from Latin famosus meaning "renowned" (from fama meaning "fame" or "repute").

The sunbirds are a group of small Old World passerine birds, and are placed within the family Nectariniidae, which is found across Africa, the Middle East and into South-east Asia. Also called green sugarbird.

The malachite sunbird has two subspecies. The nominate N. f. famosa occurs mainly in South Africa, Lesotho and western Eswatini, although its range just extends into southern Namibia and Zimbabwe. N. f. cupreonitens breeds in the highlands from Ethiopia south to northern Mozambique.

== Description ==
The breeding male malachite sunbird, which has very long central tail feathers, is 25 cm long, and the shorter-tailed female 15 cm. The adult male is metallic green when breeding, with blackish-green wings with small yellow pectoral patches. In non-breeding (eclipse) plumage, the male's upperparts are brown apart from the green wings and tail, the latter retaining the elongated feathers. The underparts in eclipse plumage are yellow, flecked with green.

The female has brown upperparts and dull yellow underparts with some indistinct streaking on the breast. Her tail is square-ended. The juvenile resembles the female.

== Habitat ==
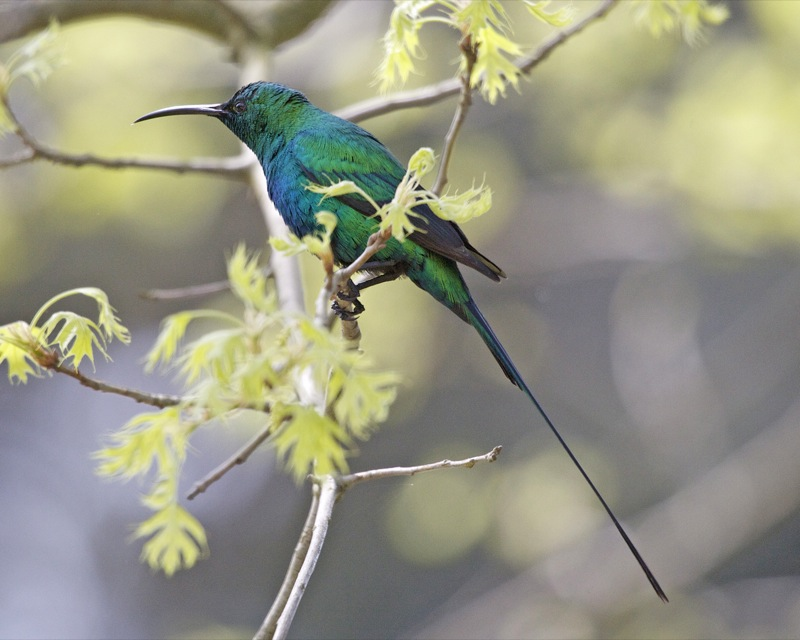
Male in South Africa

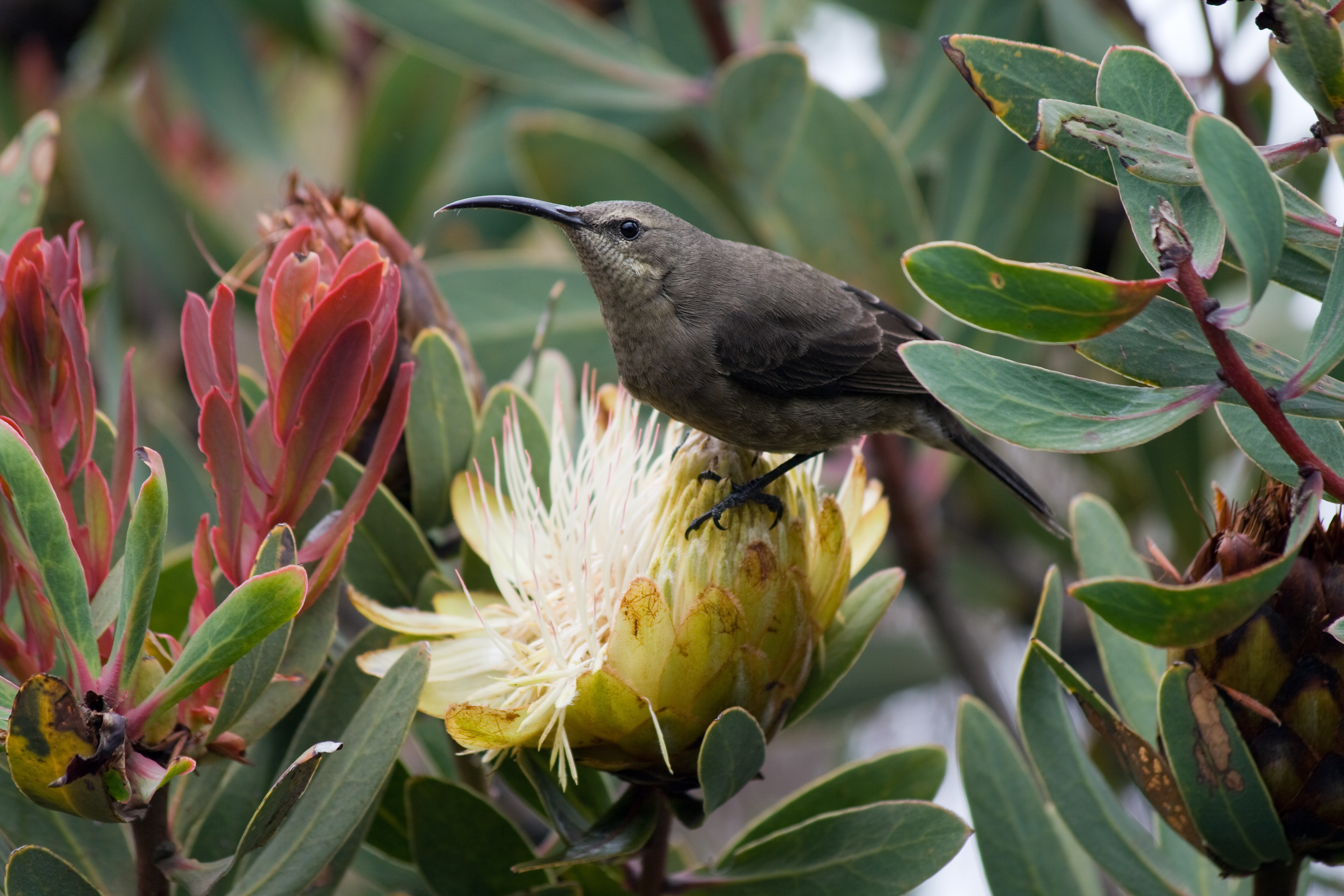
Female feeding

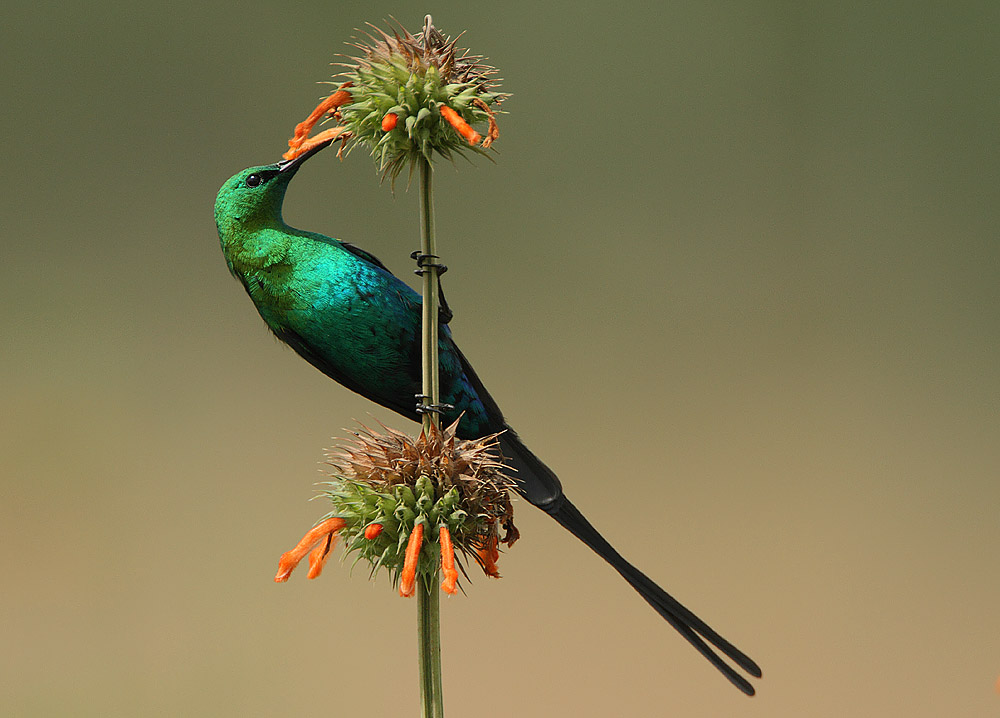
A breeding-plumage male feeding on Leonotis flower nectar.

This large sunbird is found in hilly fynbos (including Protea stands as well as areas with aloes) and cool montane and coastal scrub, up to 2,800m altitude in South Africa. It also occurs in parks and gardens (often nesting within those located in the Highveld). It is resident, but may move downhill in winter.

This species, like most sunbirds, feeds mainly on nectar, although it will also take insects, especially when feeding young. This sunbird may hunt in a similar manner to a flycatcher, hawking for insect prey from a perch.

Most sunbird species can take nectar by hovering like a hummingbird, but usually perch to feed most of the time. As a fairly large sunbird, the malachite sunbird is no exception. They have long thin down-curved bills and brush-tipped tubular tongues, both adaptations to nectar feeding. Some plant species from which malachite sunbirds feed include many Aloe species, such as Aloe broomii, Aloe ferox and Aloe arborescens, and Protea species, such as Protea roupelliae as well as various other bird-pollinated plants such as Leonotis and Strelitzia. It has been suggested that their behaviour of guarding flowering plants may have led to the selection and evolution of long-tubed flowers that would otherwise tend to be robbed (nectar taken but not pollinated) by short-billed sunbird species.

== Breeding and behaviour ==
This species is monogamous. The oval nest is usually suspended, as with most sunbirds, or constructed inside a bush. The female incubates one to three dark-blotched, greenish eggs for two weeks. The chicks are fed by both parents until fledging time, and the chicks will for a time return to the nest to roost. The malachite sunbird is often double-brooded, and may be parasitised by Klaas's cuckoo or red-chested cuckoo. It is territorial and aggressive when nesting, but highly gregarious when not breeding, forming flocks of over 1,000 birds.

The call is a loud tseep-tseep, and the male malachite sunbird has a twittering song, often accompanied by pointing its head upward and displaying his yellow pectoral tufts with his wings half open. Males also have an elaborate display flight. It was found that male birds display their pectoral tufts almost continuously throughout the night, whilst asleep, and one hypothesis is that these function as eyespots to deter nocturnal predators.
