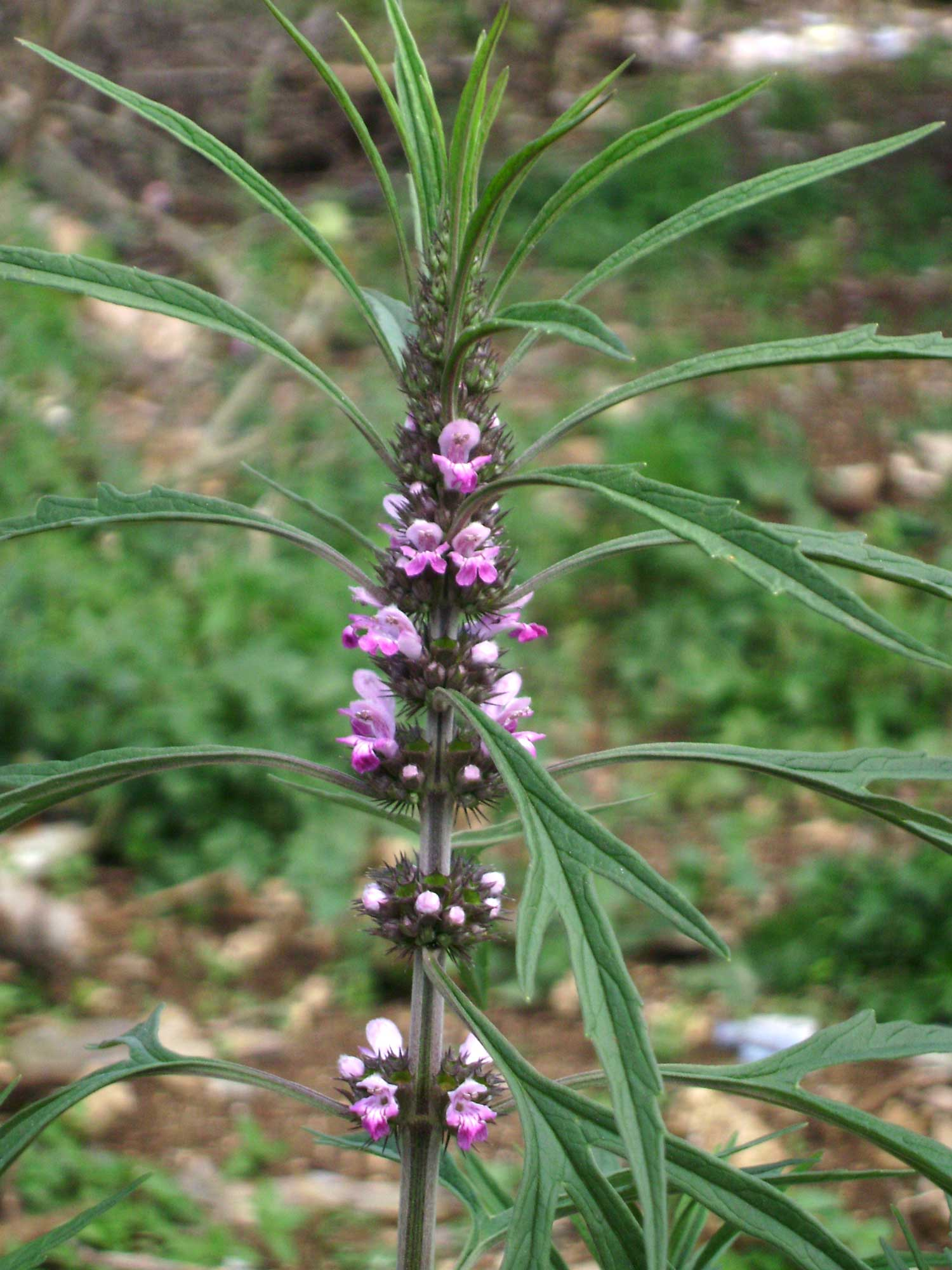

Scientific classification
- Kingdom: Plantae
- Clade: Tracheophytes
- Clade: Angiosperms
- Clade: Eudicots
- Clade: Asterids
- Order: Lamiales
- Family: Lamiaceae
- Genus: Leonurus
- Species: L. sibiricus

Binomial name
- Leonurus sibiricus L.

= Leonurus sibiricus =

Species of flowering plant

Leonurus sibiricus, commonly called honeyweed or Siberian motherwort, is an herbaceous plant species native to China, Mongolia, and Siberia. It has verticillaster inflorescence. It is naturalized in many other parts of the world, including South, Central and North Americas.

== Description ==
Leonurus sibiricus is an herbaceous annual or biennial with upright stems that usually grow from 20–80 cm (8–30 in) tall in wild, while cultivated speciments can reach 2 m (6 ft 7 in) height. Plants have long petioled basal leaves that are ovate-cordate in shape. The leaves have toothed margins and are incised with deeply cut lobes. Typically one or a few flowering stems are produced from short tap-roots. The lower stem leaves are deciduous and wither away as the plants begin blooming. The petioles of the leaves, midway up the stems are 2 cm (0.79 in) long. The flowers are produced in many flowered verticillasters, produced in whorls around the top half or more of the stem. The flowers are sessile with 8 mm (0.31 in) long calices that are tubular-campanulate in shape. The corolla is white or reddish to purple-red, with an upper lip that is oblong in shape and longer than the lower lip. When flowering is done, brown oblong shaped nutlets are produced in good number. Blooming occurs from July into late September, but flowering can occur year-round when climate permits.

This species' habitat within its natural range is stony or sandy grasslands or pine forests.

== Alkaloids ==
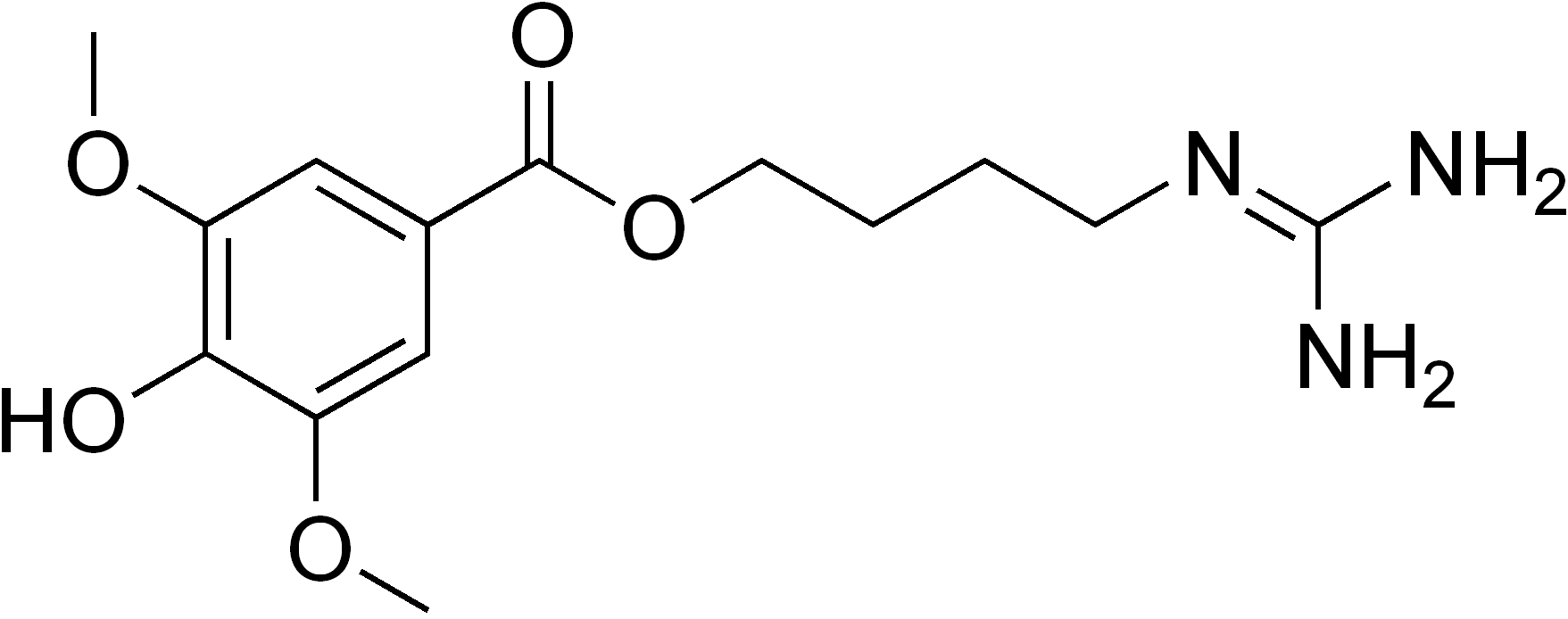
Leonurine is one of the chemical components of Leonurus sibiricus

Alkaloids isolated from the plant include:

- Cycloleonurinine
- Leoheterin
- Leonurine
- Leonurinine
- Leuronurine
- Prehispanolone
- Preleoheterin
- Stachydrine
