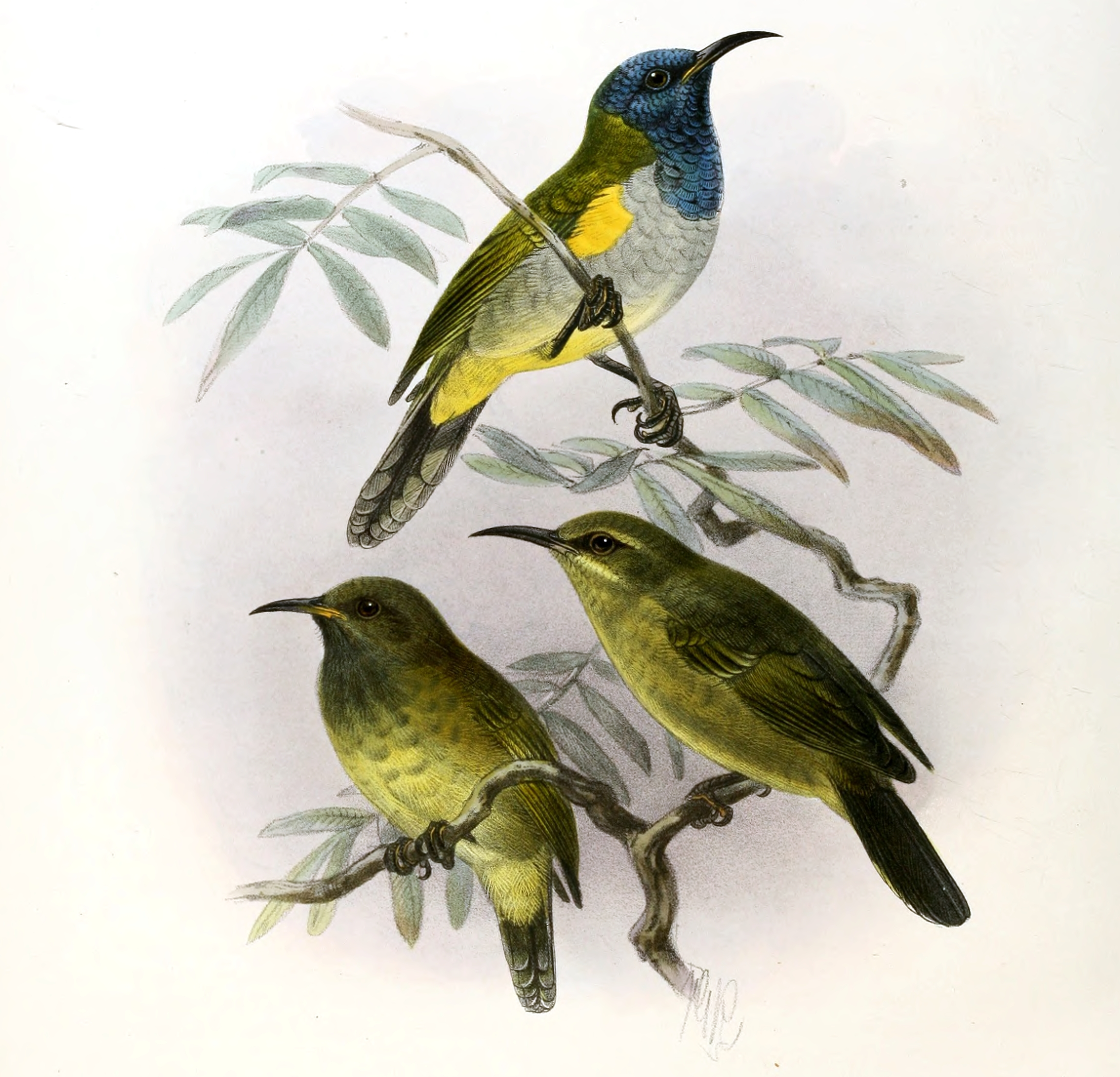

Scientific classification
- Kingdom: Animalia
- Phylum: Chordata
- Class: Aves
- Order: Passeriformes
- Family: Nectariniidae
- Genus: Anabathmis; Reichenow, 1905

Type species
- Nectarinia reichenbachii Hartlaub, 1857

Species
- Anabathmis reichenbachii Anabathmis hartlaubii Anabathmis newtonii

= Anabathmis =

Genus of birds

Anabathmis is a genus of sunbirds.

== Species ==
The genus Anabathmis contains the following three species:

Genus Anabathmis – Reichenow, 1905 – three species
Common name	Scientific name and subspecies	Range	Size and ecology	IUCN status and estimated population
Reichenbach's sunbird	Anabathmis reichenbachii (Hartlaub, 1857)	African tropical rainforest	Size: Habitat: Diet:	LC
Príncipe sunbird Male Female	Anabathmis hartlaubii (Hartlaub, 1857)	Príncipe island.	Size: Habitat: Diet:	LC
Newton's sunbird Male Female	Anabathmis newtonii (Bocage, 1887)	São Tomé Island.	Size: Habitat: Diet:	LC

The name is Greek for step or stair.
