= Stachydrine =

- Structural formula of stachydrine

Names
- IUPAC name (2S)-1,1-Dimethylpyrrolidin-1-ium-2-carboxylate
- Other names: Proline betaine

Identifiers
CAS Number	L: 471-87-4; D/L: 32039-73-9
3D model (JSmol)	L: Interactive image; D: Interactive image
Beilstein Reference	3542403
ChEBI	L: CHEBI:35280; D/L: CHEBI:181246; D: CHEBI:134398
ChEMBL	L: ChEMBL1456892; D/L: ChEMBL1986864; D: ChEMBL3559614
ChemSpider	L: 103115
DrugBank	L: DB04284
EC Number	L: 207-445-1
KEGG	L: C10172; D: C21514
PubChem CID	L: 115244; D/L: 554; D: 7016562
UNII	L: S1L688345C
CompTox Dashboard (EPA)	L: DTXSID50274274
- InChI: InChI=1S/C7H13NO2/c1-8(2)5-3-4-6(8)7(9)10/h6H,3-5H2,1-2H3/t6-/m0/s1 Key: CMUNUTVVOOHQPW-LURJTMIESA-N; D/L: Key: CMUNUTVVOOHQPW-UHFFFAOYSA-N; D: Key: CMUNUTVVOOHQPW-ZCFIWIBFSA-N
- SMILES: L: C[N+]1(C)CCC[C@H]1C([O-])=O; D: C(=O)([O-])[C@@H]1[N+](CCC1)(C)C

Properties
Chemical formula	C_{7}H_{13}NO_{2}
Molar mass	143.186 g·mol^{−1}
- Except where otherwise noted, data are given for materials in their standard state (at 25 °C [77 °F], 100 kPa). Infobox references

Stachydrine, also known as proline betaine, is a naturally occurring alkaloid found in citrus, caper, chestnuts, alfalfa, Leonurus japonicus, Maclura tricuspidata, Stachys arvensis and Arisaema heterophyllum. It has been studied for its potential health benefits. Neonatology researchers from the Masonic Institute for the Developing Brain at the University of Minnesota demonstrated that both stachydrine and the related molecule, homostachydrine, displayed lower CSF and blood levels in Rhesus Macaques with early-life iron deficiency providing a possible diagnostic biomarker in humans.
