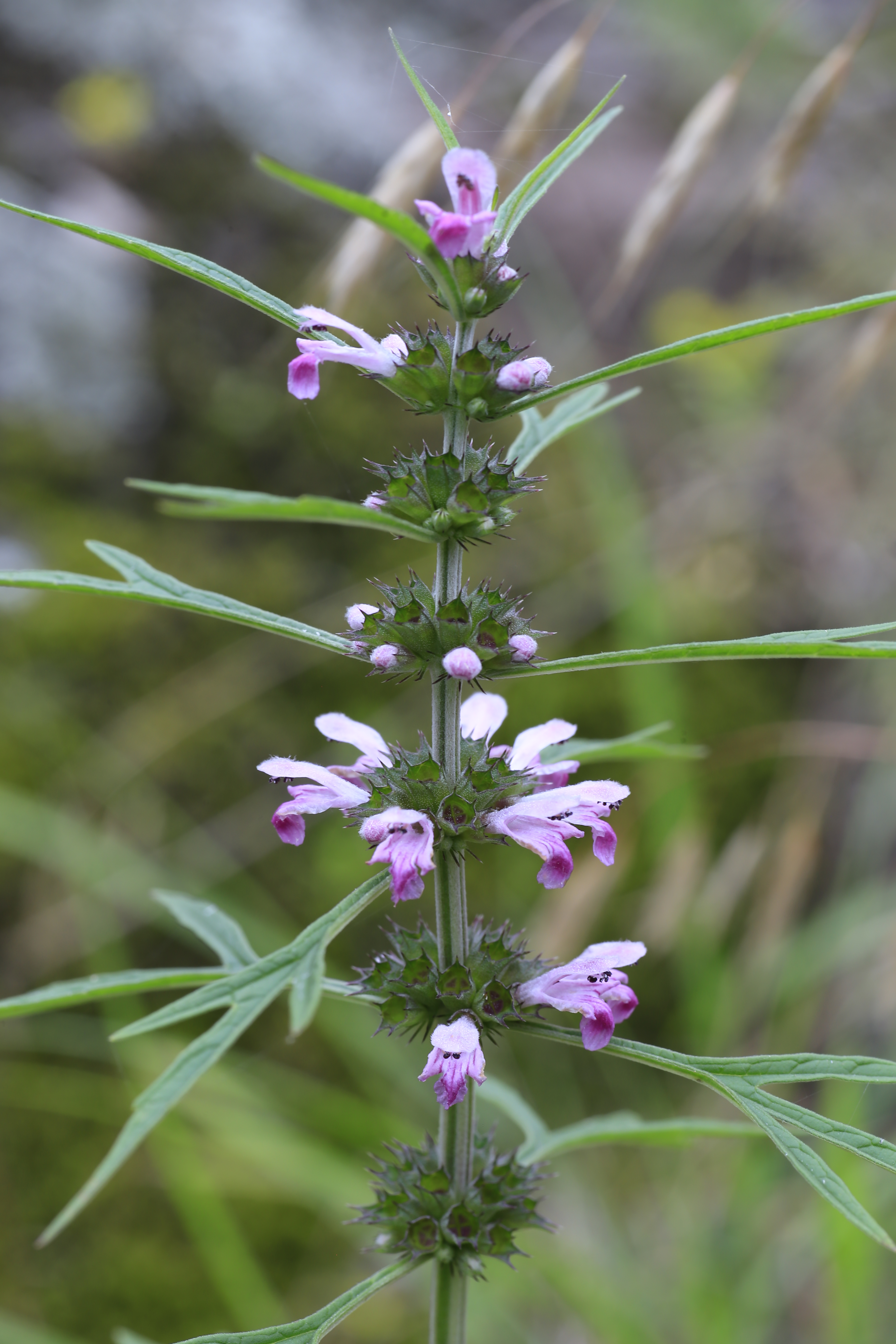
- Leonurus japonicus

Scientific classification
- Kingdom: Plantae
- Clade: Embryophytes
- Clade: Tracheophytes
- Clade: Angiosperms
- Clade: Eudicots
- Clade: Asterids
- Order: Lamiales
- Family: Lamiaceae
- Genus: Leonurus
- Species: L. japonicus

Binomial name
- Leonurus japonicus Houtt.

Synonyms
- Leonurus artemisia (Lour.) S.Y.Hu; Leonurus heterophyllus Sweet; Leonurus sibiricus auct. pl.; Stachys artemisia Lour.

= Leonurus japonicus =

Species of flowering plant

Paraleonurus japonicus, synonym: Leonurus japonicus, commonly called oriental motherwort or Chinese motherwort, is a herbaceous flowering plant native to Asia, including Korea and Japan, and China to Cambodia.

== Description ==
Plants are annual or biennial, growing from taproots. The stems are upright growing to a height of 30 to 120 cm (12 to 47 in). The flowers are sessile and produced in verticillasters. The calyx is tubular-campanulate shaped and 6 to 8 mm (0.24 to 0.31 in) long with broad triangle shaped teeth. The corolla is white or reddish to purplish red in color. Plants bloom from June to September.

It has escaped cultivation and become naturalized in other parts of the world including South and North America, Europe and Africa.

== Uses ==
Leonurus japonicus is one of the 50 fundamental herbs used in traditional Chinese medicine, where it is called yìmǔcǎo (Chinese: 益母草), literally "beneficial herb for mothers". It is used in cases of menstrual and delivery disorders caused by blood stasis such as dysmenorrhea and amenorrhea.

== Chemical constituents ==
Chemical compounds found in Leonurus japonicus include guanosine, rutin, syringic acid, and stigmasterol.
