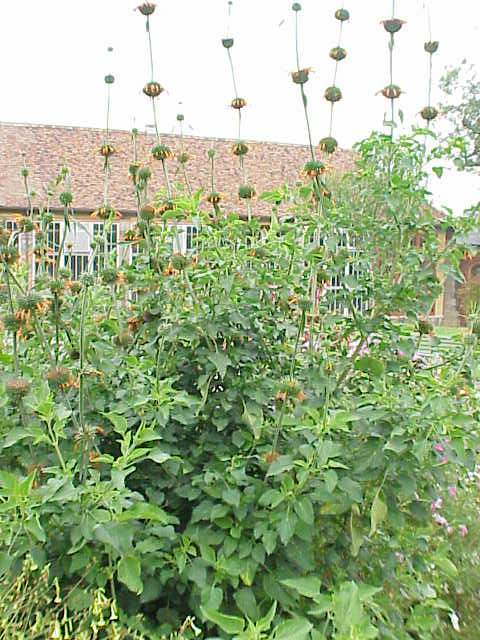

Scientific classification
- Kingdom: Plantae
- Clade: Embryophytes
- Clade: Tracheophytes
- Clade: Angiosperms
- Clade: Eudicots
- Clade: Asterids
- Order: Lamiales
- Family: Lamiaceae
- Genus: Leonotis
- Species: L. nepetifolia

Binomial name
- Leonotis nepetifolia (L.) R.Br.

Synonyms
- Leonotis nepetaefolia (L.) Mill.; Leonurus globosus Moench; Leonurus nepetifolius (L.) Mill; Phlomis nepetifolia L.

= Leonotis nepetifolia =

Species of plant

Leonotis nepetifolia, (also known as klip dagga, Christmas candlestick, or lion's ear), is a species of plant in the genus Leonotis and the family Lamiaceae (mint), native to tropical Africa and the Indian Subcontinent. It can also be found growing abundantly in much of Latin America, Southeast Asia, the West Indies, and the Southeastern United States. It grows to a height of 3 metres (9 ft 10 in) and has whorls of striking lipped flowers, that are most commonly orange, but can vary to red, white, and purple. It has drooping dark green, very soft serrated leaves that can grow up to 10 centimetres (4 in) wide. Sunbirds and ants are attracted to the flowers. It has been found growing on roadsides, rubbish heaps or waste land.

L. nepetifolia is considered an invasive plant in Australia, Florida, and Hawaii, though its tendency to grow in disturbed areas led researchers in Hawaii to conclude it's not likely to be an ecological threat.

== Varieties ==
1. Leonotis nepetifolia var. africana (P.Beauv.) J.K.Morton - Indian Subcontinent, much of Africa (light orange flowers)
2. Leonotis nepetifolia var. nepetifolia - much of Africa (dark solid orange flowers)
3. Leonotis nepetifolia var. alba - (albino/white flowers)

== Related species ==
Leonotis nepetifolia (klip dagga) is related to L. leonurus (wild dagga or lion's tail.) The most noticeable difference between the two is the leaf shape. L. nepetifolia leaves are cordate with serrated edges, except the top pair which are lanceolate with serrated edges, as pictured in taxonomy box. The leaves are all lanceolate with serrated edges on L. leonurus.

== Traditional medicine ==
Leonotis nepetifolia is known in Trinidad as shandilay and the leaves are brewed as a tea for fever, coughs, womb prolapse, malaria, and suggested to be beneficial to bone and lung health. The roots of L. nepetifolia are considered to be the botanical sources of granthiparna, an ayurvedic herb.

== Phytochemicals and pharmacology ==
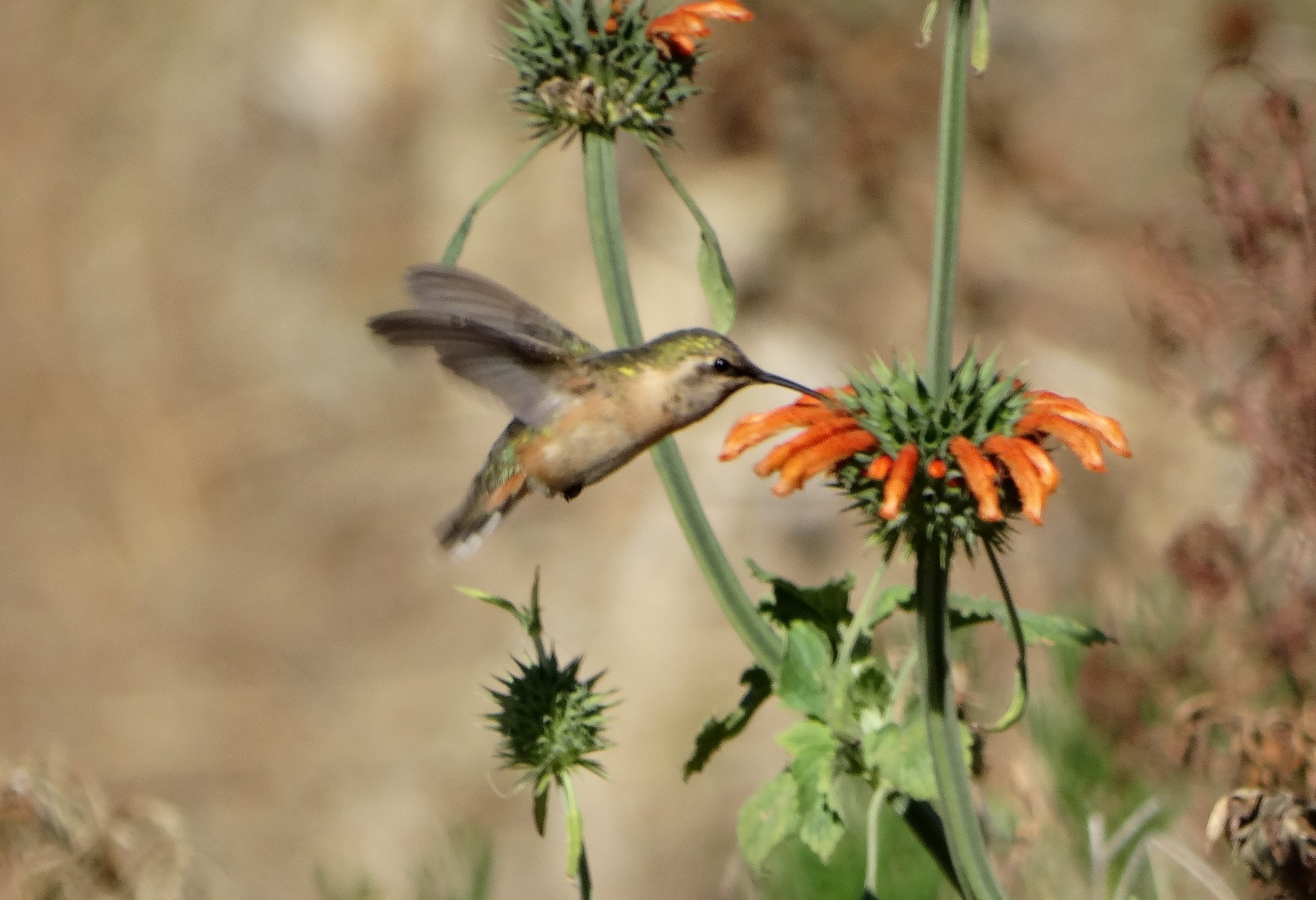
Lucifer sheartail feeding on its nectar

Leonotis nepetifolia and wild dagga contains several labdane diterpenes including Hydroxynepetaefolin, Nepetaefuran, Nepetaefolinol, Nepetaefolin, Leonotinin, Leonotin and Dubiin as well as bispirolabdane diterpenes like Leonepetaefolin A-E.

Docosatetraenoylethanolamide (DEA) has been identified in Leonotis nepetifolia flower petals.

Methanol based extracts of Leonotis nepetifolia has shown antidepressant-like effects in mice. Metabolic screening of the extract suggested nepetaefolin, methoxynepetaefolin, and 7-O-β-glucoside luteolin are the main products.

Nepetaefuran and leonotinin isolated from Leonotis nepetaefolia plant material demonstrated anti-inflammatory by suppressing NF-κB activation related to proinflammatory Cytokines.

== Gallery ==
Leaf

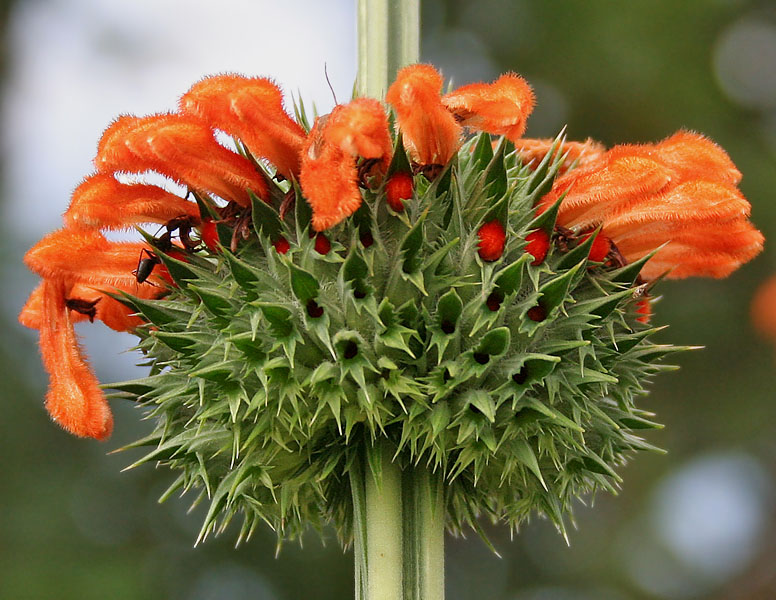
Flowers

== See also ==
- List of Lamiaceae of South Africa
