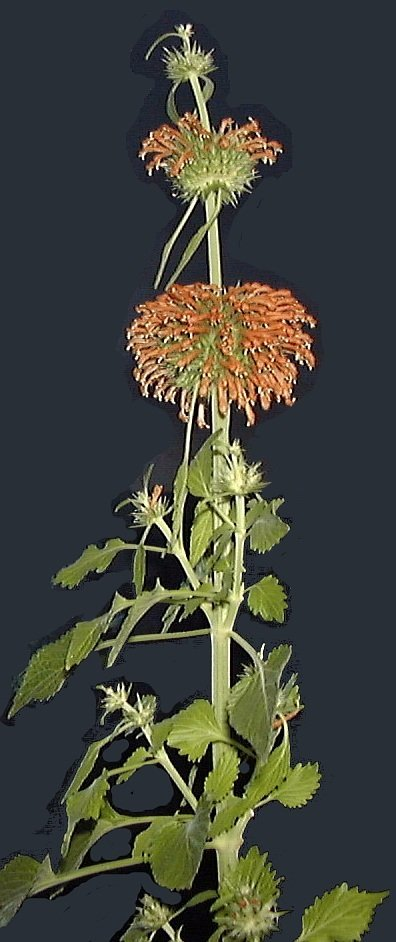
- Leonotis nepetifolia

Scientific classification
- Kingdom: Plantae
- Clade: Embryophytes
- Clade: Tracheophytes
- Clade: Spermatophytes
- Clade: Angiosperms
- Clade: Eudicots
- Clade: Asterids
- Order: Lamiales
- Family: Lamiaceae
- Subfamily: Lamioideae
- Genus: Leonotis (C.H. Persoon) R.Br.

Type species
- Leonotis ocymifolia (Burman f.) Iwarsson

Synonyms
- Leonurus Mill. 1754 not L. 1753; Hemisodon Raf.

= Leonotis =

Leonotis (lion's-ear)

Genus of flowering plants

Leonotis is a genus of flowering plants in the family Lamiaceae. One species, Leonotis nepetifolia, is native to tropical Africa and southern India. It is naturalized throughout most of the tropics. The other species are endemic to southern and eastern Africa.

Leonotis was named by Robert Brown in 1810 in Prodromus Florae Novae Hollandiae et Insulae Van Diemen. The name means "lion's ear".

The type for the genus is the specimen of Leonotis ocymifolia that was originally described as Leonotis leonitis. It is a specimen of Leonotis ocymifolia var. ocymifolia.

This plant genus is reportedly psychoactive and sedating, with a "high" similar to a that of a small dose of hashish.

== Species ==
1. Leonotis decadonta Gürke - southeast Africa from Burundi + Tanzania south to Mozambique
2. Leonotis goetzei Gürke - Tanzania
3. Leonotis grandis Iwarsson & Y.B. Harvey - Tanzania, Malawi, Zambia
4. Leonotis leonurus (L.) Robert Brown - South Africa, Angola; naturalized in Burundi, Java, St. Helena
5. Leonotis myricifolia Iwarsson & Y.B. Harvey - Tanzania, Malawi, Zambia
6. Leonotis myrothamnifolia Iwarsson & Y.B. Harvey - Malawi, Zambia
7. Leonotis nepetifolia (L.) Robert Brown - sub-Saharan Africa from Ethiopia west to Senegal and south to Transvaal, also Indian subcontinent; naturalized in Morocco, Canary Islands, Southeast Asia, New Caledonia, French Polynesia, much of Latin America; West Indies
8. Leonotis ocymifolia (Burman f.) Iwarsson - eastern Africa from Sudan + Eritrea south to Transvaal
9. Leonotis pole-evansii Hutch. - Zambia

== Taxonomy ==
Leonotis is a member of the subfamily Lamioideae. Leonotis might be paraphyletic or even polyphyletic because Leonotis leonurus is not closely related to the other species. In 2009, it was shown that Leonotis and 3 other genera are embedded in Leucas, a genus of about 100 species. If the 4 embedded genera were merged with Leucas, the expanded Leucas would have about 132 species.
