= AB-005 =

Group of stereoisomers

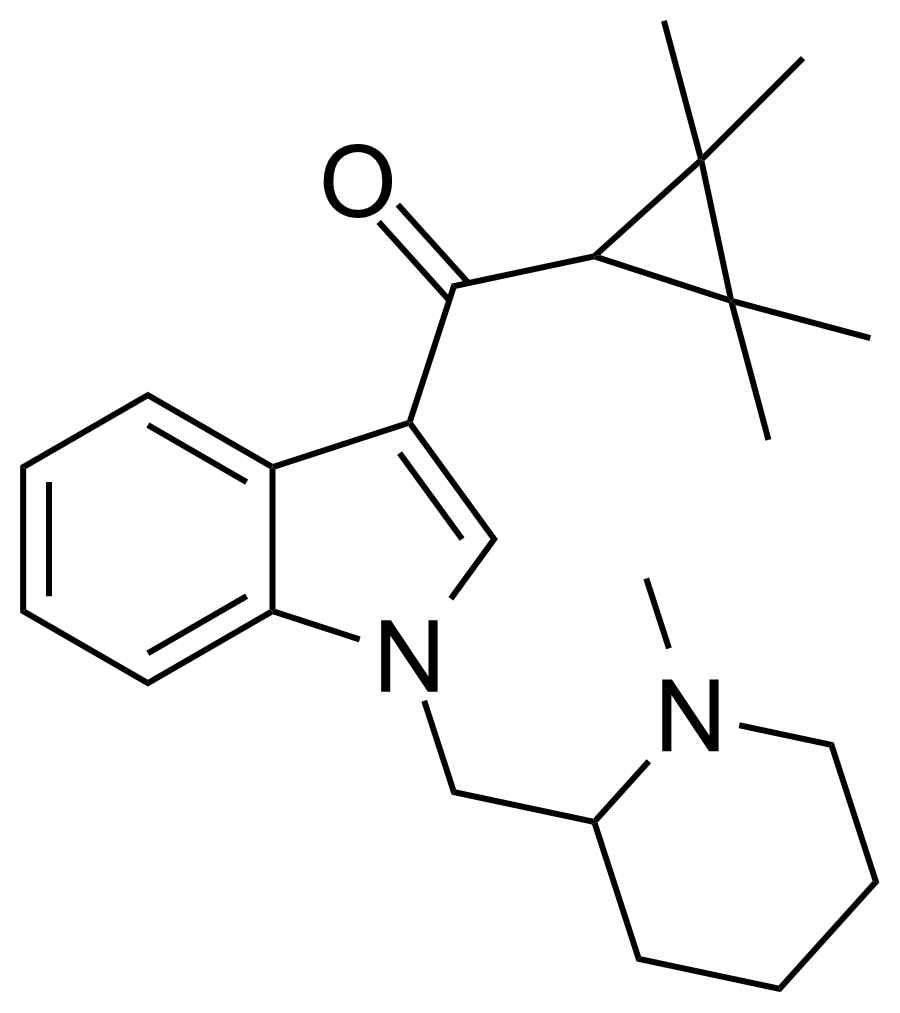

Legal status
- Legal status: CA: Schedule II; DE: NpSG (Industrial and scientific use only); UK: Class B

Identifiers
- IUPAC name: [1-[(1-Methylpiperidin-2-yl)methyl]-1H-indol-3-yl](2,2,3,3-tetramethylcyclopropyl)-methanone
- CAS Number: 895155-25-6
- PubChem CID: 11537652
- ChemSpider: 9712433
- UNII: TPY5M47AYQ
- ChEMBL: ChEMBL571330
- CompTox Dashboard (EPA): DTXSID001017492

Chemical and physical data
- Formula: C_{23}H_{32}N_{2}O
- Molar mass: 352.522 g·mol^{−1}
- 3D model (JSmol): Interactive image
- SMILES: CC1(C(C1(C)C)C(=O)C2=CN(C3=CC=CC=C32)CC4CCCCN4C)C
- InChI: InChI=1S/C23H32N2O/c1-22(2)21(23(22,3)4)20(26)18-15-25(19-12-7-6-11-17(18)19)14-16-10-8-9-13-24(16)5/h6-7,11-12,15-16,21H,8-10,13-14H2,1-5H3; Key:MOBWRRIAIHYXLB-UHFFFAOYSA-N

AB-005 or [1-[(1-methylpiperidin-2-yl)methyl]-1H-indol-3-yl](2,2,3,3-tetramethylcyclopropyl)-methanone is a designer drug offered by online vendors as a cannabimimetic agent. The structure and pharmacological activity of AB-005 was published in 2010, prior to its commercial availability in 2012, where it was reported to have high affinity for both CB1 (K_{i} = 5.5 nM) and CB2 receptors (K_{i} = 0.48 nM). AB-005 features groups found in other previously reported synthetic cannabinoids: the tetramethylcyclopropane group of UR-144 and XLR-11 as well as the (1-methyl-2-piperidinyl)methyl substituent of AM-1248 and AM-1220. No information regarding the in vivo activity of AB-005 has been published, and only anecdotal reports are known of its psychoactivity in humans.

== Legal status ==
In 2013, psychoactive products in New Zealand containing this drug were given interim approval under psychoactive substances legislation.

== See also ==
- A-834,735
- AB-001
- JWH-018
- FUB-144
