= List of AM cannabinoids =

Alexandros Makriyannis is a professor in the Department of Medicinal Chemistry at Northeastern University, where his research group has synthesized many new compounds with cannabinoid activity. Some of those are:

Cannabinoids and their affinities, selectivities and structures
Name	Class	K_{i} / nM at CB_{1}	K_{i} / nM at CB_{2}	Selectivity	CLogP	Structure	Description
AM-087	Dibenzopyran	0.43			6.47		An analgesic CB_{1} agonist derived from Δ^{8}-THC substituted with a side chain on the 3-position, roughly 100 times as potent as THC.
AM-251	Pyrazole derivative	7.5			7.08		An inverse agonist at the CB_{1} cannabinoid receptor that is structurally related to SR141716A (rimonabant), but has a higher binding affinity.
AM-279							A Schedule I substance in Alabama.
AM-281							N-(morpholin-4-yl)-1-(2,4-dichlorophenyl)-5-(4-iodophenyl)-4-methyl-1H-pyrazole-3-carboxamide
AM-356		17.9	868		5.55		A synthetically created stable chiral analog of anandamide, it acts on both cannabinoid receptors.
AM-374							Palmitylsulfonyl fluoride
AM-381							Stearylsulfonyl fluoride
AM-404					7.02		An active metabolite of paracetamol (acetaminophen) and a likely inhibitor of fatty acid amide hydrolase (FAAH)
AM-411		6.80	52.0				An adamantyl-substituted derivative of Δ^{8}-THC, it is a potent and fairly selective CB_{1} full agonist and a moderately potent CB_{2} agonist.
AM-630			32.1	CB_{2} (165×)	4.19		A potent and selective inverse agonist for the cannabinoid receptor CB_{2} and a weak partial agonist at CB_{1}.
AM-661							1-(N-methyl-2-piperidine)methyl-2-methyl-3-(2-iodo)benzoylindole
AM-678		9.00 ± 5.00	2.94 ± 2.65	CB_{2}	5.68		Another name for JWH-018, it is a full agonist at both cannabinoid receptors with some selectivity for CB_{2}.
AM-679		13.5	49.5		6.04		An iodobenzoylindole which acts as a moderately potent agonist for both cannabinoid receptors.
AM-694		0.08	1.44	CB_{1} (18×)	5.54		An iodobenzoylindole which acts as a potent and selective agonist for the CB_{1} cannabinoid receptor.
AM-735		8.9	7.4				3-bornyl-Δ8-THC, a mixed CB_{1} / CB_{2} agonist.
AM-855		22.3	58.6	CB_{1}	7.1		An analgesic derivative of Δ^{8}-tetrahydrocannabinol, it is an agonist at both CB_{1} and CB_{2} with moderate selectivity for CB_{1}.
AM-881		5.3	95				A chlorine-substituted stereoisomer of anandamide.
AM-883		9.9	226				An allyl-substituted stereoisomer of anandamide.
AM-905		1.2	5.3	CB_{1}	4.98		A potent and reasonably selective agonist for the CB_{1} cannabinoid receptor.
AM-906		0.8	9.5	CB_{1}	4.98		A potent and dodecally selective agonist for the CB_{1} cannabinoid receptor.
AM-919		2.2	3.4	CB_{1}	6.21		A potent agonist at both CB_{1} and CB_{2} with moderate selectivity for CB_{1}. It is a derivative of HU-210 and represents a hybrid structure between the classical and nonclassical cannabinoid families.
AM-926		2.2	4.3	CB_{1}			A potent agonist at both CB_{1} and CB_{2} with moderate selectivity for CB_{1}. It is a derivative of HU-210 and represents a hybrid structure between the classical and nonclassical cannabinoid families.
AM-938		1.2	0.3	CB_{2} (4×)	5.92		A potent agonist at both CB_{1} and CB_{2}. It is a derivative of HU-210 and represents a hybrid structure between the classical and nonclassical cannabinoid families.
AM-1116		7.4					A dimethylated stereoisomer of anandamide.
AM-1172							An endocannabinoid analog specifically designed to be a potent and selective inhibitor of AEA uptake that is resistant to FAAH hydrolysis.
AM-1220		3.88	73.4	CB_{1} (19×)	4.73		A potent and selective analgesic CB_{1} agonist (as racemate). The (R) enantiomer has around 1000× higher affinity for CB_{1} than (S) enantiomer.
AM-1221		52.3	0.28	CB_{2} (187×)			A potent and selective CB_{2} agonist.
AM-1235		1.5	20.4	CB_{1} (13×)			A moderately CB_{1} selective agonist.
AM-1241			3.4	CB_{2} (80×)			A potent and selective analgesic CB_{2} agonist.
AM-1248				CB_{1}			A moderately potent agonist with some selectivity for CB_{1}, containing an unusual 3-(adamant-1-oyl) substitution on the indole ring.
AM-1710	Cannabilactone			CB_{2} (54×)			A CB_{2} selective cannabilactone. Acts as a dual CB_{2} agonist / CB_{1} antagonist.
AM-1714	Cannabilactone			CB_{2} (490×)	6.17		A CB_{2} selective cannabilactone.
AM-1902							A nonclassical cannabinoid
AM-2201		1.0	2.6	CB_{1}	5.18		A potent agonist at both CB_{1} and CB_{2} with moderate selectivity for CB_{1}.
AM-2212		1.4	18.9	CB_{1}			A potent agonist at both CB_{1} and CB_{2} with dodecal selectivity for CB_{1}.
AM-2213		3.0	30	CB_{1} (10×)			A potent agonist at both CB_{1} and CB_{2}.
AM-2232		0.28	1.48		4.75		A potent agonist at both CB_{1} and CB_{2}.
AM-2233		1.8	2.2	CB_{1}	5.09		The (R) enantiomer is potent and selective CB_{1} agonist used in ^{131}I radiolabelled form to map distribution of CB_{1} receptors in brain.
AM-2389		0.16		CB_{1} (26×)	6		Classical cannabinoid derivative.
AM-3102		33000	26000				An analog of oleoylethanolamide, the endogenous agonist for proliferator-activated receptor α (PPARα). It also acts as a weak cannabinoid agonist.
AM-4030		0.7	8.6	CB_{1} (12×)	6.17		A potent agonist at both CB_{1} and CB_{2}, it is dodecally selective for CB_{1}. It is a derivative of HU-210 and represents a hybrid structure between the classical and nonclassical cannabinoid families.
AM-4054		2.2		CB_{1} (40×)			A potent but slow-onset agonist.
AM-4056		0.041			6.51		Another name for HU-243, it is a potent agonist at both the CB_{1} and CB_{2} receptors.
AM-4113				CB_{1}			A CB_{1} selective neutral antagonist.
AM-6545				CB_{1}	4.06		A peripherally selective silent antagonist of CB_{1} receptors.
AM-7438							A potent agonist of CB_{1} and CB_{2} with reduced duration of action.
AM-11245							

== See also ==
- List of CP cannabinoids
- List of JWH cannabinoids
- List of HU cannabinoids
- List of miscellaneous designer cannabinoids
