= MN-25 =

Chemical compound

Clinical data
- Other names: N-[(S)-Fenchyl]-1-[2-(morpholin-4-yl)ethyl]-7-methoxyindole-3-carboxamide

Legal status
- Legal status: CA: Schedule II; DE: NpSG (Industrial and scientific use only); UK: Class B

Identifiers
- IUPAC name: 7-methoxy-1-(2-morpholin-4-ylethyl)-N-[(1R,3S,4S)-2,2,4-trimethyl-3-bicyclo[2.2.1]heptanyl]indole-3-carboxamide
- CAS Number: 501926-82-5; 2-methyl derivative: 501927-29-3
- PubChem CID: 71308243
- ChemSpider: 26286811
- UNII: 8WXU5YRE25
- ChEMBL: ChEMBL3234671

Chemical and physical data
- Formula: C_{26}H_{37}N_{3}O_{3}
- Molar mass: 439.600 g·mol^{−1}
- 3D model (JSmol): Interactive image
- SMILES: COC1=C(N(CCN2CCOCC2)C=C3C(N[C@H]4[C@@]5(C)CC[C@H](C5)C4(C)C)=O)C3=CC=C1
- InChI: InChI=1S/C26H37N3O3/c1-25(2)18-8-9-26(3,16-18)24(25)27-23(30)20-17-29(11-10-28-12-14-32-15-13-28)22-19(20)6-5-7-21(22)31-4/h5-7,17-18,24H,8-16H2,1-4H3,(H,27,30)/t18-,24-,26+/m1/s1; Key:VQGDMQICNRCQEH-UFKXBGGNSA-N

MN-25 (UR-12) is a drug invented by Bristol-Myers Squibb, that acts as a reasonably selective agonist of peripheral cannabinoid receptors. It has moderate affinity for CB_{2} receptors with a K_{i} of 11 nM, but 22x lower affinity for the psychoactive CB_{1} receptors with a K_{i} of 245 nM. The indole 2-methyl derivative has the ratio of affinities reversed however, with a K_{i} of 8 nM at CB_{1} and 29 nM at CB_{2}, which contrasts with the usual trend of 2-methyl derivatives having increased selectivity for CB_{2} (cf. JWH-018 vs JWH-007, JWH-081 vs JWH-098).

Chemically, it is closely related to another indole-3-carboxamide synthetic cannabinoid, Org 28611, but with a different cycloalkyl substitution on the carboxamide, and the cyclohexylmethyl group replaced by morpholinylethyl, as in JWH-200 or A-796,260. Early compounds such as these have subsequently led to the development of many related indole-3-carboxamide cannabinoid ligands.

== See also ==
- A-834,735
- AB-001
- AM-1221
- BMS-F
- CUMYL-PEGACLONE
- JTE 7-31
- JWH-203
- MDA-19
- SR-144,528
- UR-144
