= 4-HTMPIPO =

Chemical compound

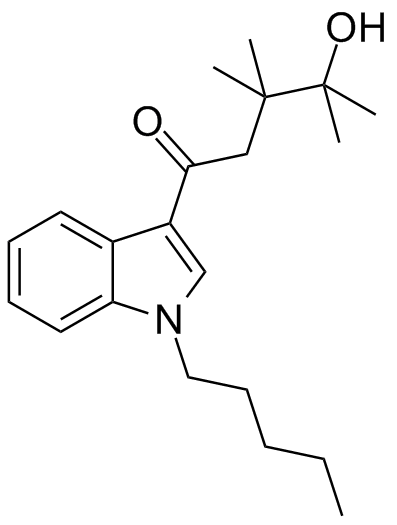

Legal status
- Legal status: CA: Schedule II; DE: NpSG (Industrial and scientific use only); UK: Under Psychoactive Substances Act

Identifiers
- IUPAC name: 4-hydroxy-3,3,4-trimethyl-1-(1-pentyl-1H-indol-3-yl)-1-pentanone
- CAS Number: 1445751-38-1
- ChemSpider: 32078885
- UNII: 4NL5X39H8F
- CompTox Dashboard (EPA): DTXSID901045446

Chemical and physical data
- Formula: C_{21}H_{31}NO_{2}
- Molar mass: 329.484 g·mol^{−1}
- 3D model (JSmol): Interactive image
- SMILES: CCCCCN1C=C(C2=CC=CC=C21)C(=O)CC(C)(C)C(C)(C)O
- InChI: InChI=1S/C21H31NO2/c1-6-7-10-13-22-15-17(16-11-8-9-12-18(16)22)19(23)14-20(2,3)21(4,5)24/h8-9,11-12,15,24H,6-7,10,13-14H2,1-5H3; Key:GWHGUYKAGQLPTQ-UHFFFAOYSA-N

4-HTMPIPO is a synthetic cannabinoid drug first identified in smoking products purchased from online vendors in 2012. 4-HTMPIPO is the product resulting from the electrophilic addition of water to the cyclopropane moiety of synthetic cannabinoid UR-144. Nothing is known about the in vitro or in vivo pharmacology of 4-HTMPIPO.

== See also ==
- AB-001
- JWH-018
- UR-144
- XLR-11
