= Tedalinab =

Chemical compound

Identifiers
- IUPAC name: (4S,7R)-1-(2,4-difluorophenyl)-N-(1,1-dimethylethyl)-4,5,6,7-tetrahydro-4,7-methano-1H-indazole-3-carboxamide
- CAS Number: 916591-01-0
- PubChem CID: 24872953
- ChemSpider: 29340966
- UNII: 5R7X34Y6Q1
- CompTox Dashboard (EPA): DTXSID001108817

Chemical and physical data
- Formula: C_{19}H_{21}F_{2}N_{3}O
- Molar mass: 345.394 g·mol^{−1}
- 3D model (JSmol): Interactive image
- SMILES: CC(C)(C)NC(=O)C1=NN(C2=C1[C@@H]3CC[C@H]2C3)C4=C(C=C(C=C4)F)F
- InChI: InChI=1S/C19H21F2N3O/c1-19(2,3)22-18(25)16-15-10-4-5-11(8-10)17(15)24(23-16)14-7-6-12(20)9-13(14)21/h6-7,9-11H,4-5,8H2,1-3H3,(H,22,25)/t10-,11+/m0/s1; Key:NTPZXHMTJGOMCJ-WDEREUQCSA-N

Tedalinab (GRC-10693) is a drug developed by Glenmark Pharmaceuticals for the treatment of osteoarthritis and neuropathic pain, which acts as a potent and selective cannabinoid CB_{2} receptor agonist. It has a very high selectivity of 4700x for CB_{2} over the related CB_{1} receptor, has good oral bioavailability and has shown promising safety results and effective analgesic and antiinflammatory actions in early clinical trials. Many related compounds are known, most of which also show high CB_{2} selectivity.

== See also ==
- CBS-0550
- Olorinab
- SER-601
