= C23H26FN3O2 =

The molecular formula C_{23}H_{26}FN_{3}O_{2} (molar mass: 395.470 g/mol, exact mass: 395.2009 u) may refer to:

- ADB-FUBIATA
- ADB-FUBHQUCA
- PX-1
- Spiperone
