= ADB-FUBHQUCA =

Chemical compound

Identifiers
- IUPAC name: (S)-N-(1-Amino-3,3-dimethyl-1-oxobutan-2-yl)-1-(4-fluorobenzyl)-1,4-dihydroquinoline-3-carboxamide
- PubChem CID: 165361603
- CompTox Dashboard (EPA): DTXSID201342574

Chemical and physical data
- Formula: C_{23}H_{26}FN_{3}O_{2}
- Molar mass: 395.478 g·mol^{−1}
- 3D model (JSmol): Interactive image
- SMILES: NC(=O)[C@@H](NC(=O)C=1Cc2ccccc2N(C=1)Cc1ccc(F)cc1)C(C)(C)C
- InChI: InChI=1S/C23H26FN3O2/c1-23(2,3)20(21(25)28)26-22(29)17-12-16-6-4-5-7-19(16)27(14-17)13-15-8-10-18(24)11-9-15/h4-11,14,20H,12-13H2,1-3H3,(H2,25,28)(H,26,29); Key:WEFDGWANUSMUJL-UHFFFAOYSA-N

ADB-FUBHQUCA is a synthetic cannabinoid receptor agonist that has been sold as a designer drug, first reported in 2022. It is related to the previously reported compound ADB-FUBICA but with the central indole ring system expanded to a 1,4-dihydroquinoline structure. This breaks the aromaticity of the ring system, and ADB-FUBHQUCA is relatively low in potency compared to related compounds where the aromatic core is retained.

== See also ==
- ADB-FUBIATA
- S-444,823
- S-777,469
- SER-601
