= BMS-F =

Chemical compound

Identifiers
- IUPAC name: (S)-2-{[7-Methoxy-2-methyl-1-(2-morpholin-4-yl-ethyl)-1H-indole-3-carbonyl]-amino}-3-phenyl-propionic acid methyl ester
- CAS Number: 354569-07-6
- PubChem CID: 10227614
- ChemSpider: 8403104
- ChEMBL: ChEMBL311690

Chemical and physical data
- Formula: C_{27}H_{33}N_{3}O_{5}
- Molar mass: 479.577 g·mol^{−1}
- 3D model (JSmol): Interactive image
- SMILES: CC1=C(C2=C(N1CCN3CCOCC3)C(=CC=C2)OC)C(=O)N[C@@H](CC4=CC=CC=C4)C(=O)OC
- InChI: InChI=1S/C27H33N3O5/c1-19-24(26(31)28-22(27(32)34-3)18-20-8-5-4-6-9-20)21-10-7-11-23(33-2)25(21)30(19)13-12-29-14-16-35-17-15-29/h4-11,22H,12-18H2,1-3H3,(H,28,31)/t22-/m0/s1; Key:HQUJODHGYIPBGV-QFIPXVFZSA-N

BMS-F is a chemical from the aminoalkylindole family invented by Bristol-Myers Squibb around 1999, that acts as a potent and selective agonist for the cannabinoid receptor CB_{2}, with a K_{i} of 8 nM at CB_{2} and 500x selectivity over the related CB_{1} receptor. It has antiinflammatory effects and inhibits release of TNF-α.

== See also ==
- A-796,260
- APP-FUBINACA
- JWH-200
- MDMB-FUBINACA
- MN-25
- Pravadoline
- S-777,469
- WIN 55,212-2
