= AZ-11713908 =

Chemical compound

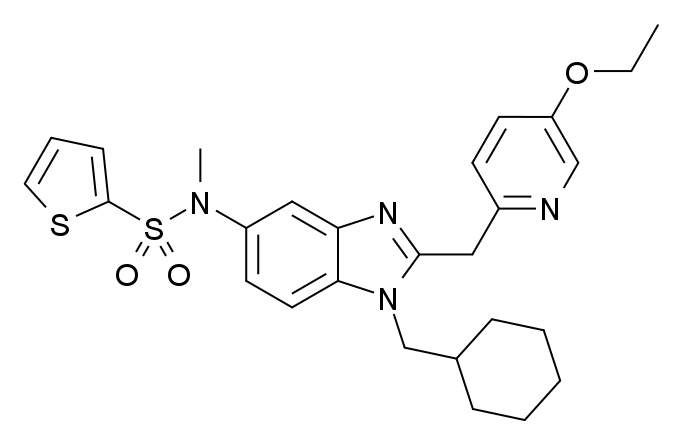

Identifiers
- IUPAC name: N-(1-(cyclohexylmethyl)-2-((5-ethoxypyridin-2-yl)methyl)-1H-benzo[d]imidazol-5-yl)-N-methylthiophene-2-sulfonamide
- CAS Number: 1309682-69-6
- ChemSpider: 26286889
- UNII: MN7RR3VQL7

Chemical and physical data
- Formula: C_{27}H_{32}N_{4}O_{3}S_{2}
- Molar mass: 524.70 g·mol^{−1}
- 3D model (JSmol): Interactive image
- SMILES: c5ccsc5S(=O)(=O)N(C)c3ccc1c(c3)nc(Cc(cc2)ncc2OCC)n1CC4CCCCC4
- InChI: InChI=1S/C27H32N4O3S2/c1-3-34-23-13-11-21(28-18-23)16-26-29-24-17-22(30(2)36(32,33)27-10-7-15-35-27)12-14-25(24)31(26)19-20-8-5-4-6-9-20/h7,10-15,17-18,20H,3-6,8-9,16,19H2,1-2H3; Key:YIEVWZCZMDYKQH-UHFFFAOYSA-N

AZ-11713908 is a drug developed by AstraZeneca which is a peripherally selective cannabinoid agonist, acting as a potent agonist at the CB_{1} receptor and a partial agonist at CB_{2}. It has poor blood–brain barrier penetration, and so while it is an effective analgesic in animal tests, it produces only peripheral effects at low doses, with much weaker symptoms of central effects compared to other cannabinoid drugs such as WIN 55,212-2. Many related benzimidazole-derived cannabinoid ligands are known.

== See also ==
- AM-6545
- AZD-1940
- CB-13
- RQ-00202730
