= C23H21FN2O =

The molecular formula C_{23}H_{21}FN_{2}O (molar mass: 360.42 g/mol, exact mass: 360.1638 u) may refer to:

- FUBIMINA (also known as BIM-2201, BZ-2201 and FTHJ)
- THJ-2201
