= AM-938 =

Chemical compound

Identifiers
- IUPAC name: (6S,6aR,9R,10aR)-9-(Hydroxymethyl)-6-(3-hydroxyprop-1-ynyl)-6-methyl-3-(2-methyloctan-2-yl)-6a,7,8,9,10,10a-hexahydrobenzo[c]chromen-1-ol
- CAS Number: 303113-08-8
- PubChem CID: 10646208
- ChemSpider: 8821567
- UNII: NPU5SWP5ZS

Chemical and physical data
- Formula: C_{27}H_{40}O_{4}
- Molar mass: 428.613 g·mol^{−1}
- 3D model (JSmol): Interactive image
- SMILES: Oc2cc(cc1O[C@@](C#CCO)([C@@H]3CC[C@H](C[C@H]3c12)CO)C)C(C)(C)CCCCCC
- InChI: InChI=1S/C27H40O4/c1-5-6-7-8-12-26(2,3)20-16-23(30)25-21-15-19(18-29)10-11-22(21)27(4,13-9-14-28)31-24(25)17-20/h16-17,19,21-22,28-30H,5-8,10-12,14-15,18H2,1-4H3/t19-,21-,22-,27+/m1/s1; Key:FFRHKSZKZQWCOY-UOTIDGTBSA-N

AM-938 (part of the AM cannabinoid series) is an analgesic drug which is a cannabinoid receptor agonist. It is a derivative of HU-210 which has been substituted with a 6β-(3-hydroxyprop-1-ynyl) group. This adds a "southern" aliphatic hydroxyl group to the molecule as seen in the CP-series of nonclassical cannabinoid drugs, and so AM-938 represents a hybrid structure between the classical and nonclassical cannabinoid families, with the 6-hydroxyalkyl chain rigidified with a triple bond. This gives AM-938 a greater degree of selectivity, so while it is still a potent agonist at both CB_{1} and CB_{2}, it is reasonably selective for CB_{2}, with a K_{i} of 0.3 nM at CB_{2} and 1.2 nM at CB_{1}, a selectivity of around four-fold.

== See also ==
- AM-4030 - double bond instead of a triple bond
- AM-919 - saturated rather than a triple bond
- HU-243 - "southern" side chain replaced by methyl unit
