= SR-18 =

SR-18 may refer to:

- A synthetic cannabinoid also known as BTM-8
- State Route 18
