= AM-679 (cannabinoid) =

Chemical compound

Legal status
- Legal status: CA: Schedule II; DE: NpSG (Industrial and scientific use only); UK: Class B

Identifiers
- IUPAC name: (2-Iodophenyl)(1-pentyl-1H-indol-3-yl)methanone
- CAS Number: 335160-91-3
- ChemSpider: 25991468
- UNII: 61TFT4BO1C
- CompTox Dashboard (EPA): DTXSID901009999

Chemical and physical data
- Formula: C_{20}H_{20}INO
- Molar mass: 417.290 g·mol^{−1}
- 3D model (JSmol): Interactive image
- SMILES: Ic1ccccc1C(=O)c(c2ccccc23)cn3CCCCC
- InChI: InChI=1S/C20H20INO/c1-2-3-8-13-22-14-17(15-9-5-7-12-19(15)22)20(23)16-10-4-6-11-18(16)21/h4-7,9-12,14H,2-3,8,13H2,1H3; Key:GAJBHYUAJOTAEW-UHFFFAOYSA-N

AM-679 (part of the AM cannabinoid series) is a drug that acts as a moderately potent agonist for the cannabinoid receptors, with a K_{i} of 13.5 nM at CB_{1} and 49.5 nM at CB_{2}. AM-679 was one of the first 3-(2-iodobenzoyl)indole derivatives that was found to have significant cannabinoid receptor affinity, and while AM-679 itself has only modest affinity for these receptors, it was subsequently used as a base to develop several more specialised cannabinoid ligands that are now widely used in research, including the potent CB_{1} agonists AM-694 and AM-2233, and the selective CB_{2} agonist AM-1241. AM-679 was first identified as having been sold as a cannabinoid designer drug in Hungary in 2011, along with another novel compound 1-pentyl-3-(1-adamantoyl)indole.

== See also ==
- RCS-4
