= C26H38O2 =

The molecular formula C_{26}H_{38}O_{2} may refer to:

- AM-855, an analgesic drug
- Mecigestone, a steroidal progestin
- Quingestrone, also known as progesterone 3-cyclopentyl enol ether (PCPE)
