= FAB-144 =

Synthetic Cannabiboid

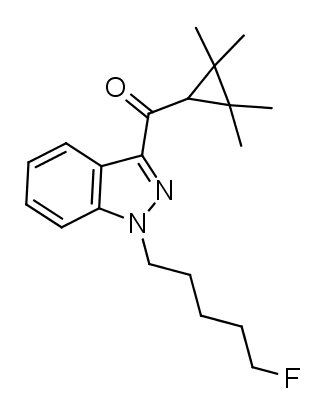

Legal status
- Legal status: CA: Schedule II; DE: NpSG (Industrial and scientific use only); UK: Class B

Identifiers
- IUPAC name: 1-(5-fluoropentyl)-3-(2,2,3,3-tetramethylcyclopropanecarbonyl)-1H-indazole
- CAS Number: 2180935-79-7
- PubChem CID: 102135350
- ChemSpider: 32055552
- UNII: B9JT6F9X8V
- CompTox Dashboard (EPA): DTXSID101032704

Chemical and physical data
- Formula: C_{20}H_{27}FN_{2}O
- Molar mass: 330.447 g·mol^{−1}
- 3D model (JSmol): Interactive image
- SMILES: FCCCCCN1N=C(C(C2C(C)(C)C2(C)C)=O)C3=C1C=CC=C3
- InChI: InChI=1S/C20H27FN2O/c1-19(2)18(20(19,3)4)17(24)16-14-10-6-7-11-15(14)23(22-16)13-9-5-8-12-21/h6-7,10-11,18H,5,8-9,12-13H2,1-4H3; Key:LVJQJRUAYXVEGN-UHFFFAOYSA-N

FAB-144 is an indazole-based synthetic cannabinoid that is presumed to be a potent agonist of the CB_{1} receptor and has been sold online as a designer drug. It is the indazole analogue of XLR-11.

== Legal status ==
Sweden's public health agency suggested classifying FAB-144 as a hazardous substance on November 10, 2014.

== See also ==
- JWH-018
- STS-135
- UR-144
