= C22H24FN3O2 =

The molecular formula C_{22}H_{24}FN_{3}O_{2} (molar mass: 381.45 g/mol, exact mass: 381.1853 u) may refer to:

- ADB-FUBICA
- Benperidol
