= AM-694 =

Chemical compound

Legal status
- Legal status: AU: S9 (Prohibited substance); CA: Schedule II; DE: Anlage II (Authorized trade only, not prescriptible); UK: Class B; US: Schedule I

Identifiers
- IUPAC name: 1-[(5-Fluoropentyl)-1H-indol-3-yl]-(2-iodophenyl)methanone
- CAS Number: 335161-03-0
- PubChem CID: 9889172
- ChemSpider: 8064843
- UNII: 6RK7KN7L1O
- ChEBI: CHEBI:138017
- CompTox Dashboard (EPA): DTXSID30187156

Chemical and physical data
- Formula: C_{20}H_{19}FINO
- Molar mass: 435.281 g·mol^{−1}
- 3D model (JSmol): Interactive image
- SMILES: Ic2ccccc2C(=O)c1cn(CCCCCF)c3ccccc13
- InChI: InChI=1S/C20H19FINO/c21-12-6-1-7-13-23-14-17(15-8-3-5-11-19(15)23)20(24)16-9-2-4-10-18(16)22/h2-5,8-11,14H,1,6-7,12-13H2; Key:LFFIIZFINPPEMC-UHFFFAOYSA-N

AM-694 (1-(5-fluoropentyl)-3-(2-iodobenzoyl)indole) is a designer drug that acts as a potent and selective agonist for the cannabinoid receptor CB_{1}. It is used in scientific research for mapping the distribution of CB_{1} receptors.

== Pharmacology ==
AM-694 is an agonist for cannabinoid receptors. It has a K_{i} of 0.08 nM at CB_{1} and 18 times selectivity over CB_{2} with a K_{i} of 1.44 nM. It is unclear what is responsible for this unusually high CB_{1} binding affinity, but it makes the ^{18}F radiolabelled derivative of AM-694 useful for mapping the distribution of CB_{1} receptors in the body.

== Metabolism ==
Pathways of metabolism include hydrolytic defluorination, carboxylation, and monohydroxylation of the N-alkyl chain.

== Legal status ==
=== Finland ===
AM-694 is scheduled in the "government decree on psychoactive substances banned from the consumer market".

== See also ==
- AM-679
- AM-1235
- AM-2201
- AM-2232
- AM-2233
- FUBIMINA
- JWH-018
- List of AM cannabinoids
- List of JWH cannabinoids
- THJ-2201
