= XLR-12 =

Chemical compound

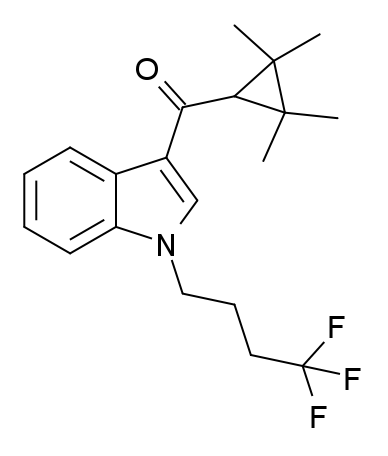

Legal status
- Legal status: CA: Schedule II

Identifiers
- IUPAC name: (2,2,3,3-Tetramethylcyclopropyl)[1-(4,4,4-trifluorobutyl)-1H-indol-3-yl]methanone
- CAS Number: 895155-78-9
- PubChem CID: 11559386
- ChemSpider: 9734160
- UNII: EG79K9XQF5
- CompTox Dashboard (EPA): DTXSID201024738

Chemical and physical data
- Formula: C_{20}H_{24}F_{3}NO
- Molar mass: 351.413 g·mol^{−1}
- 3D model (JSmol): Interactive image
- SMILES: O=C(C1C(C1(C)C)(C)C)c1cn(c2c1cccc2)CCCC(F)(F)F
- InChI: InChI=1S/C20H24F3NO/c1-18(2)17(19(18,3)4)16(25)14-12-24(11-7-10-20(21,22)23)15-9-6-5-8-13(14)15/h5-6,8-9,12,17H,7,10-11H2,1-4H3; Key:PEXYKZYTXIEEOB-UHFFFAOYSA-N

XLR-12 is an indole-based synthetic cannabinoid drug that was invented by Abbott Laboratories in 2006. It is an analogue of XLR-11 where the 5-fluoropentyl chain has been replaced with a 4,4,4-trifluorobutyl chain. XLR-12 is relatively highly selective for the CB_{2} receptor, with a K_{i} of 0.09 nM and 167x selectivity over the related CB_{1} receptor, however it still retains appreciable affinity for CB_{1} with a K_{i} of 15 nM.

== Legal status ==
XLR-12 is illegal in Hungary and Japan.

== See also ==
- UR-144
- FUB-144
- JTE 7-31
