= AM-2233 =

Chemical compound

Legal status
- Legal status: CA: Schedule II; DE: Anlage II (Authorized trade only, not prescriptible); NZ: Temporary Class; UK: Class B

Identifiers
- IUPAC name: 1-[(N-methylpiperidin-2-yl)methyl]-3-(2-iodobenzoyl)indole
- CAS Number: 444912-75-8
- PubChem CID: 10226340
- ChemSpider: 8401830
- UNII: Z489688DK3
- ChEMBL: ChEMBL364266
- CompTox Dashboard (EPA): DTXSID401014171
- ECHA InfoCard: 100.233.382

Chemical and physical data
- Formula: C_{22}H_{23}IN_{2}O
- Molar mass: 458.343 g·mol^{−1}
- 3D model (JSmol): Interactive image
- SMILES: Ic3ccccc3C(=O)c1cn(CC2CCCCN2C)c4c1cccc4
- InChI: InChI=1S/C22H23IN2O/c1-24-13-7-6-8-16(24)14-25-15-19(17-9-3-5-12-21(17)25)22(26)18-10-2-4-11-20(18)23/h2-5,9-12,15-16H,6-8,13-14H2,1H3; Key:KSLCYQTUSSEGPT-UHFFFAOYSA-N

AM-2233 is a drug that acts as a highly potent full agonist for the cannabinoid receptors, with a K_{i} of 1.8 nM at CB_{1} and 2.2 nM at CB_{2} as the active (R) enantiomer. It was developed as a selective radioligand for the cannabinoid receptors and has been used as its ^{131}I derivative for mapping the distribution of the CB_{1} receptor in the brain. AM-2233 was found to fully substitute for THC in rats, with a potency lower than that of JWH-018 but higher than WIN 55,212-2.

It is notable for inducing tinnitus, though the reasons for this are unclear and may provide valuable insight into tinnitus research.

== Legal status ==
As of October 2015 AM-2233 is a controlled substance in China.

== See also ==
- AM-679
- AM-694
- AM-1220
- AM-1221
- AM-1235
- AM-1241
- AM-2232
- Cannabipiperidiethanone
- FUBIMINA
- JWH-018
- List of AM cannabinoids
- List of JWH cannabinoids
- List of HU cannabinoids
- List of designer drugs
