= AM-1248 =

Chemical compound

Legal status
- Legal status: CA: Schedule II; DE: NpSG (Industrial and scientific use only); NZ: Temporary Class; UK: Class B

Identifiers
- IUPAC name: 1-[(N-methylpiperidin-2-yl)methyl]-3-(adamant-1-oyl)indole
- CAS Number: 335160-66-2
- PubChem CID: 10293794
- ChemSpider: 8469262
- UNII: 5EX9HEF4HK
- CompTox Dashboard (EPA): DTXSID101017326

Chemical and physical data
- Formula: C_{26}H_{34}N_{2}O
- Molar mass: 390.571 g·mol^{−1}
- 3D model (JSmol): Interactive image
- SMILES: CN1CCCCC1Cn(c6)c2ccccc2c6C(=O)C5(C3)CC(CC3C4)CC4C5
- InChI: InChI=1S/C26H34N2O/c1-27-9-5-4-6-21(27)16-28-17-23(22-7-2-3-8-24(22)28)25(29)26-13-18-10-19(14-26)12-20(11-18)15-26/h2-3,7-8,17-21H,4-6,9-16H2,1H3; Key:JRECAXBHMULNJQ-UHFFFAOYSA-N

AM-1248 is a drug that acts as a moderately potent agonist for both the cannabinoid receptors CB_{1} and CB_{2}, but with some dispute between sources over its exact potency and selectivity. Replacing the 3-(1-naphthoyl) group found in many indole derived cannabinoid ligands, with an adamantoyl group, generally confers significant CB_{2} selectivity, but reasonable CB_{1} affinity and selectivity is retained when an N-methylpiperidin-2-ylmethyl substitution is used at the indole 1-position. The related compound 1-pentyl-3-(1-adamantoyl)indole was identified as having been sold as a cannabinoid designer drug in Hungary in 2011, along with another synthetic cannabinoid AM-679.

== Legality ==
Sweden's public health agency suggested to classify AM-1248 as hazardous substance on June 1, 2015.

As of October 2015 AM-1248 is a controlled substance in China.

== See also ==
- A-834,735
- A-PBITMO
- AB-001
- AM-411
- AM-1220
- AM-2233
- Cannabipiperidiethanone
