= AZD-1940 =

Chemical compound

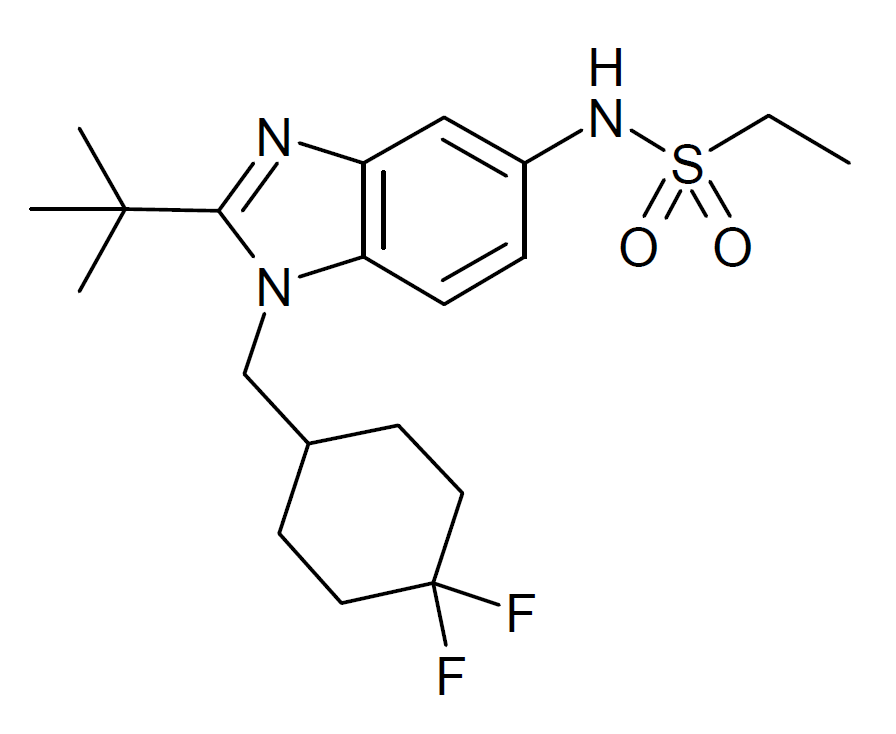

Clinical data
- Other names: AZD1940; ART27.13; ART-27.13; ART-2713; ART2713; NEO-1940; NEO1940
- Routes of administration: Oral

Legal status
- Legal status: Investigational new drug

Identifiers
- IUPAC name: N-{1-[(4,4-difluorocyclohexyl)methyl]-2-(1,1-dimethylethyl)-1H-benzimidazol-5-yl}ethanesulfonamide
- CAS Number: 881413-29-2
- PubChem CID: 11675994
- ChemSpider: 9850723
- UNII: 0J0035E9FT
- CompTox Dashboard (EPA): DTXSID701114855

Chemical and physical data
- Formula: C_{20}H_{29}F_{2}N_{3}O_{2}S
- Molar mass: 413.53 g·mol^{−1}
- 3D model (JSmol): Interactive image
- SMILES: CCS(=O)(=O)Nc1ccc2c(c1)nc(n2CC3CCC(CC3)(F)F)C(C)(C)C
- InChI: InChI=1S/C20H29F2N3O2S/c1-5-28(26,27)24-15-6-7-17-16(12-15)23-18(19(2,3)4)25(17)13-14-8-10-20(21,22)11-9-14/h6-7,12,14,24H,5,8-11,13H2,1-4H3; Key:ZAGGGZCIFUQHOH-UHFFFAOYSA-N

AZD-1940, also known as ART27.13 or NEO-1940, is a drug developed by AstraZeneca, that is a peripherally selective cannabinoid agonist which binds with high affinity to both the cannabinoid CB_{1} and CB_{2} receptors. It was developed for the treatment of neuropathic pain, but while it showed good peripheral selectivity in animal studies, in human clinical trials it failed to show sufficient analgesic efficacy and produced unexpectedly strong side effects associated with central cannabinoid activity, and so was discontinued from further development.

== See also ==
- A-PONASA
- AZ-11713908
- 2F-QMPSB
- RQ-00202730
