= Cannabipiperidiethanone =

Chemical compound

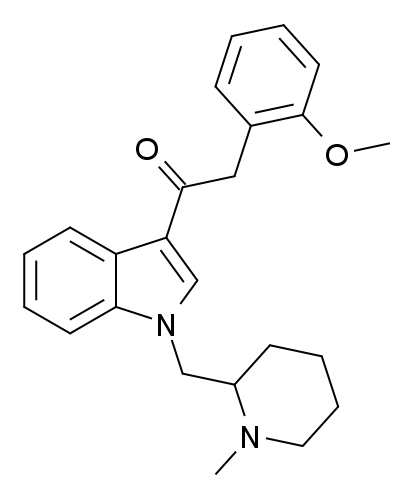

Legal status
- Legal status: US: Schedule I

Identifiers
- IUPAC name: 2-(2-Methoxyphenyl)-1-[1-([1-methylpiperidin-2-yl]methyl)indol-3-yl]ethanone
- CAS Number: 1345970-43-5
- ChemSpider: 27330303
- UNII: G66388U44D
- CompTox Dashboard (EPA): DTXSID90705471

Chemical and physical data
- Formula: C_{24}H_{28}N_{2}O_{2}
- Molar mass: 376.500 g·mol^{−1}
- 3D model (JSmol): Interactive image
- SMILES: COc2ccccc2CC(=O)c(c4c1cccc4)cn1CC3CCCCN3C
- InChI: InChI=1S/C24H28N2O2/c1-25-14-8-7-10-19(25)16-26-17-21(20-11-4-5-12-22(20)26)23(27)15-18-9-3-6-13-24(18)28-2/h3-6,9,11-13,17,19H,7-8,10,14-16H2,1-2H3; Key:AJSBNWAHEDVQJT-UHFFFAOYSA-N

Cannabipiperidiethanone (CPE or 1-(N-methylpiperidin-2-ylmethyl)-3-(2-methoxyphenylacetyl)indole) is a synthetic cannabinoid that has been found to be an ingredient of "herbal smoking blends" sold in Japan.

The drug's binding affinity was measured at the CB_{1} and CB_{2} receptors and it was found to have an IC_{50} of 591 nM at CB_{1} and 968 nM at CB_{2}, making it 2.3 times and 9.4 times weaker than JWH-250 at these two targets respectively.

In the United States, CB_{1} receptor agonists of the 3-phenylacetylindole class such as cannabipiperidiethanone are Schedule I Controlled Substances.

== See also ==
- AM-1220
- AM-1248
- AM-2233
- JWH-203
- RCS-8
