= A-796,260 =

Chemical compound

Legal status
- Legal status: UK: Class B

Identifiers
- IUPAC name: [1-(2-morpholin-4-ylethyl)-1H-indol-3-yl]-(2,2,3,3-tetramethylcyclopropyl)methanone
- CAS Number: 895155-26-7
- PubChem CID: 11584525
- ChemSpider: 9759290
- UNII: 5N69DXA53Z
- ChEMBL: ChEMBL262865
- CompTox Dashboard (EPA): DTXSID801010107
- ECHA InfoCard: 100.233.198

Chemical and physical data
- Formula: C_{22}H_{30}N_{2}O_{2}
- Molar mass: 354.494 g·mol^{−1}
- 3D model (JSmol): Interactive image
- SMILES: C4COCCN4CCn(c3ccccc13)cc1C(=O)C2C(C)(C)C2(C)C
- InChI: InChI=1S/C22H30N2O2/c1-21(2)20(22(21,3)4)19(25)17-15-24(18-8-6-5-7-16(17)18)10-9-23-11-13-26-14-12-23/h5-8,15,20H,9-14H2,1-4H3; Key:ZCFHOMLAFTWDFM-UHFFFAOYSA-N

A-796,260 is a drug developed by Abbott Laboratories that acts as a potent and selective cannabinoid CB_{2} receptor agonist. Replacing the aromatic 3-benzoyl or 3-naphthoyl group found in most indole derived cannabinoids with the 3-tetramethylcyclopropylmethanone group, imparts significant selectivity for CB_{2}, and A-796,260 was found to be a highly selective CB_{2} agonist with little affinity for CB_{1}, having a CB_{2} K_{i} of 4.6 nM vs 945 nM at CB_{1}. It has potent analgesic and anti-inflammatory actions in animal models, being especially effective in models of neuropathic pain, but without producing cannabis-like behavioral effects.

== Legal Status ==
As of October 2015 A-796,260 is a controlled substance in China.

== See also ==
- A-834,735
- A-836,339
- BMS-F
- JWH-200
- UR-144
- XLR-11
