= AB-FUBICA =

Chemical compound

Legal status
- Legal status: CA: Schedule II; DE: NpSG (Industrial and scientific use only); UK: Class B

Identifiers
- IUPAC name: N-[(1S)-1-(Aminocarbonyl)-2-methylpropyl]-1-[(4-fluorophenyl)methyl]-1H-indole-3-carboxamide
- CAS Number: 1801338-22-6
- ChemSpider: 57427397
- UNII: U6SUE53VVY

Chemical and physical data
- Formula: C_{21}H_{22}FN_{3}O_{2}
- Molar mass: 367.424 g·mol^{−1}
- 3D model (JSmol): Interactive image
- SMILES: O=C(N[C@H](C(N)=O)C(C)C)C1=CN(CC2=CC=C(F)C=C2)C3=CC=CC=C31
- InChI: InChI=1S/C21H22FN3O2/c1-13(2)19(20(23)26)24-21(27)17-12-25(18-6-4-3-5-16(17)18)11-14-7-9-15(22)10-8-14/h3-10,12-13,19H,11H2,1-2H3,(H2,23,26)(H,24,27)/t19-/m0/s1; Key:KTVPQJSKKGZIEA-IBGZPJMESA-N

AB-FUBICA is a drug that acts as a potent agonist for the cannabinoid receptors, with EC_{50} values of 21 nM at CB_{1} and 15 nM at CB_{2}.

== See also ==
- AB-FUBINACA
- ADB-FUBICA
