= S-777,469 =

Chemical compound

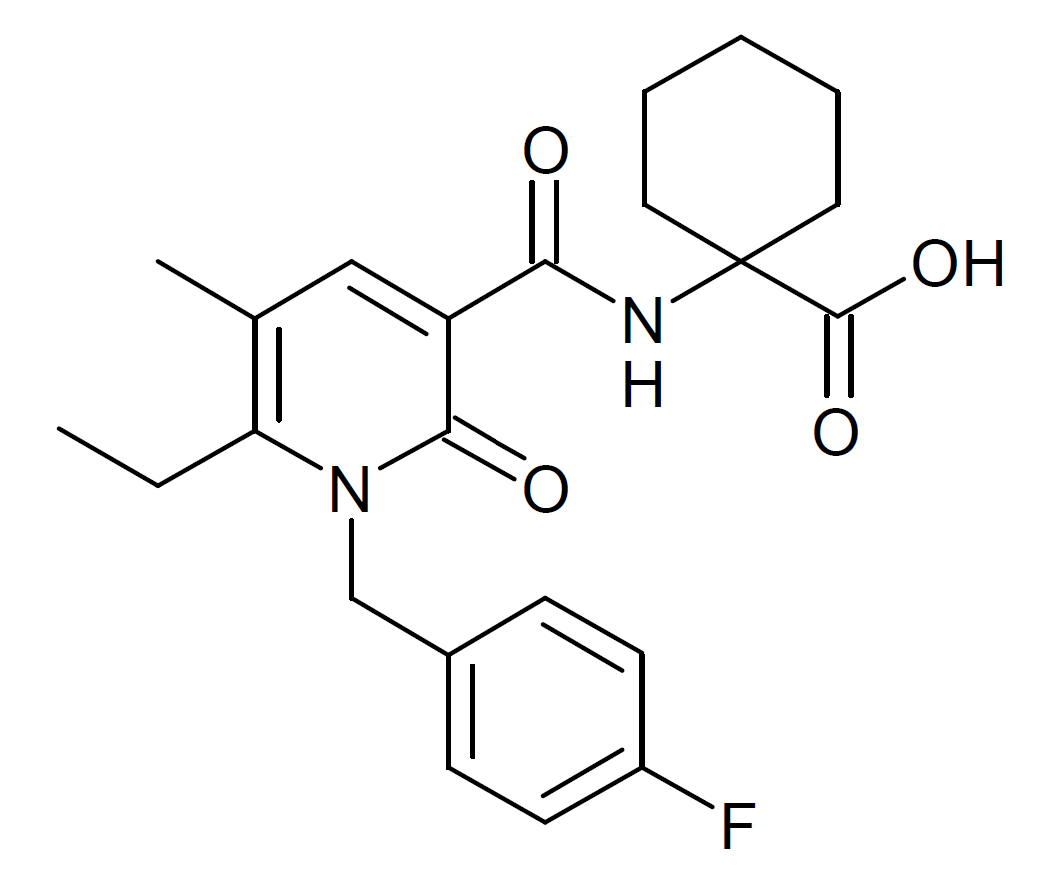

Clinical data
- ATC code: none

Identifiers
- IUPAC name: 1-[[6-ethyl-1-[(4-fluorophenyl)methyl]-5-methyl-2-oxopyridine-3-carbonyl]amino]cyclohexane-1-carboxylic acid
- CAS Number: 885496-53-7
- PubChem CID: 57331749
- UNII: 88NI79737I
- ChEMBL: ChEMBL2019090
- CompTox Dashboard (EPA): DTXSID301336647

Chemical and physical data
- Formula: C_{23}H_{27}FN_{2}O_{4}
- Molar mass: 414.477 g·mol^{−1}
- 3D model (JSmol): Interactive image
- SMILES: CCC1=C(C=C(C(=O)N1CC2=CC=C(C=C2)F)C(=O)NC3(CCCCC3)C(=O)O)C
- InChI: InChI=1S/C23H27FN2O4/c1-3-19-15(2)13-18(20(27)25-23(22(29)30)11-5-4-6-12-23)21(28)26(19)14-16-7-9-17(24)10-8-16/h7-10,13H,3-6,11-12,14H2,1-2H3,(H,25,27)(H,29,30); Key:JIYXOJFSPOFZPY-UHFFFAOYSA-N

S-777,469 is a drug developed by Shionogi which is a cannabinoid receptor agonist, with 128x selectivity for the CB_{2} subtype, having a CB_{2} affinity of 36nM, and a CB_{1} affinity over 4600nM.

In animal studies it showed antipruritic effects, and passed Phase II human trials for the treatment of atopic dermatitis, but development was ultimately not continued further.

== See also ==
- BMS-F
- RQ-00202730
- S-444,823
