= SER-601 =

Chemical compound

Clinical data
- Routes of administration: Oral

Identifiers
- IUPAC name: N-(Adamant-1-yl)-1-pentyl-4-oxo-6-isopropyl-1,4-dihydroquinoline-3-carboxamide
- CAS Number: 1048038-90-9
- PubChem CID: 25034551
- ChemSpider: 24606023
- UNII: S723GJY405
- ChEMBL: ChEMBL502276
- CompTox Dashboard (EPA): DTXSID80648525

Chemical and physical data
- Formula: C_{28}H_{38}N_{2}O_{2}
- Molar mass: 434.624 g·mol^{−1}
- 3D model (JSmol): Interactive image
- SMILES: CC(C)c5ccc(c1c5)n(CCCCC)cc(c1=O)C(=O)NC4(C2)CC(CC2C3)CC3C4
- InChI: InChI=1S/C28H38N2O2/c1-4-5-6-9-30-17-24(26(31)23-13-22(18(2)3)7-8-25(23)30)27(32)29-28-14-19-10-20(15-28)12-21(11-19)16-28/h7-8,13,17-21H,4-6,9-12,14-16H2,1-3H3,(H,29,32); Key:KUMKLUDNETVLDS-UHFFFAOYSA-N

SER-601 (COR-167) is a drug which acts as a potent and selective cannabinoid CB_{2} receptor agonist, based on a quinolone-3-carboxylic acid core structure, with 190 times selectivity for CB_{2} over the related CB_{1} receptor. It has analgesic effects in animal studies, as well as neuroprotective effects, but without a "cannabis high" due to its low affinity for CB_{1}. A number of related compounds are known, almost all of which have high selectivity for CB_{2}.

== See also ==
- A-836,339
- ADB-FUBHQUCA
- CBS-0550
