= WIN 54,461 =

Chemical compound

Identifiers
- IUPAC name: [6-bromo-2-methyl-1-(2-morpholin-4-ylethyl)-1H-indol-3-yl](4-methoxyphenyl)methanone
- CAS Number: 166599-63-9
- PubChem CID: 9868699
- ChemSpider: 8044390
- UNII: 379WF7JJ36
- ChEMBL: ChEMBL310741
- CompTox Dashboard (EPA): DTXSID901017332

Chemical and physical data
- Formula: C_{23}H_{25}BrN_{2}O_{3}
- Molar mass: 457.368 g·mol^{−1}
- 3D model (JSmol): Interactive image
- SMILES: Brc4ccc2c(n(c(c2C(=O)c1ccc(OC)cc1)C)CCN3CCOCC3)c4

WIN 54,461 (6-Bromopravadoline) is a drug that acts as a potent and selective inverse agonist for the cannabinoid receptor CB_{2}.

== See also ==
- ADB-5'Br-PINACA
- AM-630 (6-Iodopravadoline)
- WIN 48,098 (Pravadoline)
- WIN 55,212-2
