= AB-001 =

Chemical compound

Legal status
- Legal status: CA: Schedule II; DE: Anlage II (Authorized trade only, not prescriptible); UK: Class B

Identifiers
- IUPAC name: 1-Pentyl-3-(adamant-1-oyl)indole
- CAS Number: 1345973-49-0
- PubChem CID: 57404070
- ChemSpider: 26286891
- UNII: H657DIA015
- CompTox Dashboard (EPA): DTXSID90158822

Chemical and physical data
- Formula: C_{24}H_{31}NO
- Molar mass: 349.518 g·mol^{−1}
- 3D model (JSmol): Interactive image
- SMILES: CCCCCn1cc(c2c1cccc2)C(=O)C34CC5CC(C3)CC(C5)C4
- InChI: InChI=1S/C24H31NO/c1-2-3-6-9-25-16-21(20-7-4-5-8-22(20)25)23(26)24-13-17-10-18(14-24)12-19(11-17)15-24/h4-5,7-8,16-19H,2-3,6,9-15H2,1H3; Key:SHWDYCMMUPPWQM-UHFFFAOYSA-N

AB-001 (1-pentyl-3-(1-adamantoyl)indole) is a designer drug that was found as an ingredient in synthetic cannabis smoking blends in Ireland in 2010 and Hungary and Germany in 2011. It is unclear who AB-001 was originally developed by, but it is structurally related to compounds such as AM-1248 and its corresponding 1-(tetrahydropyran-4-ylmethyl) analogue, which are known to be potent cannabinoid agonists with moderate to a high selectivity for CB_{2} over CB_{1}. The first published synthesis and pharmacological evaluation of AB-001 revealed that it acts as a full agonist at CB1 (EC_{50} = 35 nM) and CB2 receptors (EC_{50} = 48 nM). However, AB-001 was found to possess only weak cannabimimetic effects in rats at doses up to 30 mg/kg, making it less potent than the carboxamide analogue APICA, which possesses potent cannabimimetic activity at doses of 3 mg/kg.

== See also ==
- A-834,735
- A-PBITMO
- AB-005
- AM-1248
- APICA
- JWH-018
- JWH-250
- RCS-4
- RCS-8
- MN-25
- UR-144
- Structural scheduling of synthetic cannabinoids
- Adamantane
