= CBS-0550 =

Chemical compound

Identifiers
- IUPAC name: N-[5-tert-butyl-2-(cyclopropylmethyl)-1-methylpyrazol-3-ylidene]-2-fluoro-3-(trifluoromethyl)benzamide
- CAS Number: 887289-02-3
- PubChem CID: 24763642
- ChemSpider: 23320245
- UNII: TB180WQ919
- CompTox Dashboard (EPA): DTXSID401030288

Chemical and physical data
- Formula: C_{20}H_{23}F_{4}N_{3}O
- Molar mass: 397.418 g·mol^{−1}
- 3D model (JSmol): Interactive image
- SMILES: C3CC3Cn1c(cc(C(C)(C)C)n1C)=N\C(=O)c2cccc(C(F)(F)F)c2F
- InChI: InChI=1S/C20H23F4N3O/c1-19(2,3)15-10-16(27(26(15)4)11-12-8-9-12)25-18(28)13-6-5-7-14(17(13)21)20(22,23)24/h5-7,10,12H,8-9,11H2,1-4H3/b25-16+; Key:PABOWKPYVAFTRN-PCLIKHOPSA-N

CBS-0550 is a drug developed by Taisho Pharmaceutical, which acts as a potent and selective cannabinoid CB_{2} receptor agonist, with 1400x selectivity for CB_{2} over the related CB_{1} receptor. Unlike most cannabinoid agonists, CBS-0550 has good solubility in water, and in animal studies it was found to produce analgesic and anti-hyperalgesic effects. A number of related compounds have been developed with similar properties.

== See also ==
- A-836,339
- SER-601
