= AM-1714 =

Chemical compound

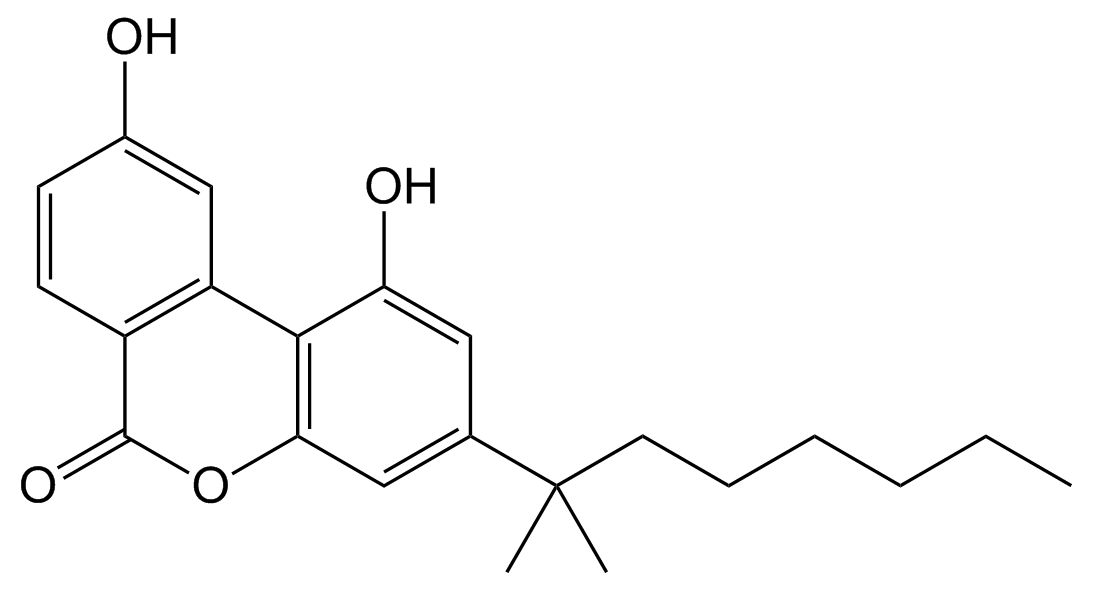

Legal status
- Legal status: In general: uncontrolled

Identifiers
- IUPAC name: 1,9-dihydroxy-3-(2-methyloctan-2-yl)-6H-benzo[c]chromen-6-one
- CAS Number: 335371-37-4
- PubChem CID: 9950486
- ChemSpider: 8126097
- UNII: E3OY6PCU04
- CompTox Dashboard (EPA): DTXSID801045362

Chemical and physical data
- Formula: C_{22}H_{26}O_{4}
- Molar mass: 354.446 g·mol^{−1}
- 3D model (JSmol): Interactive image
- SMILES: O=C(O1)C2=C(C=C(O)C=C2)C3=C1C=C(C(C)(C)CCCCCC)C=C3O
- InChI: InChI=1S/C22H26O4/c1-4-5-6-7-10-22(2,3)14-11-18(24)20-17-13-15(23)8-9-16(17)21(25)26-19(20)12-14/h8-9,11-13,23-24H,4-7,10H2,1-3H3; Key:BWKBVEVEQOCSCF-UHFFFAOYSA-N

AM-1714 (part of the AM cannabinoid series) is a drug that acts as a reasonably selective agonist of the peripheral cannabinoid receptor CB_{2}, with sub-nanomolar affinity and 490x selectivity over the related CB_{1} receptor. In animal studies it has both analgesic and anti-allodynia effects. The 9-methoxy derivative AM-1710 has similar CB_{2} affinity but only 54x selectivity over CB_{1}.

== See also ==
- Cannabinol
- Canbisol
