= WIN 56,098 =

Chemical compound

Identifiers
- IUPAC name: Anthracen-9-yl-{2-methyl-1-[2-(morpholin-4-yl)ethyl]-1H-indol-3-yl}methanone
- CAS Number: 134959-50-5
- PubChem CID: 9803721
- ChemSpider: 7979481
- ChEMBL: ChEMBL105605
- CompTox Dashboard (EPA): DTXSID801029724

Chemical and physical data
- Formula: C_{30}H_{28}N_{2}O_{2}
- Molar mass: 448.566 g·mol^{−1}
- 3D model (JSmol): Interactive image
- SMILES: O=C(c3c1ccccc1cc2ccccc23)c4c6ccccc6n(c4C)CCN5CCOCC5

WIN 56,098 is a chemical that is considered to be an aminoalkylindole derivative. It is a tricyclic aryl derivative that acts as a competitive antagonist at the CB_{2} cannabinoid receptor. Its activity at CB_{1} was significantly less effective. WIN 56,098 failed to antagonize any of the in vivo effects of THC.

== See also ==
- WIN 55,212-2
- WIN 55,225
