= AM-1221 =

Chemical compound

Legal status
- Legal status: CA: Schedule II; DE: NpSG (Industrial and scientific use only); UK: Under Psychoactive Substances Act; US: Schedule I

Identifiers
- IUPAC name: 1-[(N-Methylpiperidin-2-yl)methyl]-2-methyl-3-(naphthalen-1-oyl)-6-nitroindole
- CAS Number: 335160-53-7
- PubChem CID: 11604318
- ChemSpider: 26286945
- UNII: SHC6SNM293
- CompTox Dashboard (EPA): DTXSID701009967

Chemical and physical data
- Formula: C_{27}H_{27}N_{3}O_{3}
- Molar mass: 441.531 g·mol^{−1}
- 3D model (JSmol): Interactive image
- SMILES: CN1CCCCC1CN2C=C(C3=C2C=C(C=C3)[N+](=O)[O-])C(=O)C4=CC=CC5=CC=CC=C54
- InChI: InChI=1S/C27H27N3O3/c1-18-26(27(31)23-12-7-9-19-8-3-4-11-22(19)23)24-14-13-20(30(32)33)16-25(24)29(18)17-21-10-5-6-15-28(21)2/h3-4,7-9,11-14,16,21H,5-6,10,15,17H2,1-2H3; Key:QGNIEJBBHMMNOZ-UHFFFAOYSA-N

AM-1221 is a drug that acts as a potent and selective agonist for the cannabinoid receptor CB_{2}, with a K_{i} of 0.28 nM at CB_{2} and 52.3 nM at the CB_{1} receptor, giving it around 180 times selectivity for CB_{2}. The 2-methyl and 6-nitro groups on the indole ring both tend to increase CB_{2} affinity while generally reducing affinity at CB_{1}, explaining the high CB_{2} selectivity of AM-1221. However, despite this relatively high selectivity for CB_{2}, its CB_{1} affinity is still too strong to make it useful as a truly selective CB_{2} agonist, so the related compound AM-1241 is generally preferred for research purposes.

In the United States, all CB_{1} receptor agonists of the 3-(1-naphthoyl)indole class such as AM-1221 are Schedule I Controlled Substances.

== Legal status ==
It is illegal to supply, trade, sell, distribute, import or transport the pharmaceutical drug in the UK under the Psychoactive Substances Act 2016 which was in force on May 26, 2016.

== See also ==
- AM-630
- AM-1220
- AM-1235
- AM-2233
- UR-144
- MN-25
