= Olorinab =

Chemical compound

Clinical data
- Routes of administration: Oral

Identifiers
- IUPAC name: (4aS,5aS)-N-((2S)-1-Hydroxy-3,3-dimethylbutan-2-yl)-1-(4-oxidopyrazin-2-yl)-4,4a,5,5a-tetrahydro-1H-cyclopropa(4,5)cyclopenta[1,2-c]pyrazole-3-carboxamide
- CAS Number: 1268881-20-4
- PubChem CID: 60164925
- UNII: 581F7DFA9B
- KEGG: D11429
- CompTox Dashboard (EPA): DTXSID101099756

Chemical and physical data
- Formula: C_{18}H_{23}N_{5}O_{3}
- Molar mass: 357.414 g·mol^{−1}
- 3D model (JSmol): Interactive image
- SMILES: CC(C)(C)[C@@H](CO)NC(=O)C1=NN(C2=C1C[C@H]3[C@@H]2C3)C4=NC=C[N+](=C4)[O-]
- InChI: InChI=1S/C18H23N5O3/c1-18(2,3)13(9-24)20-17(25)15-12-7-10-6-11(10)16(12)23(21-15)14-8-22(26)5-4-19-14/h4-5,8,10-11,13,24H,6-7,9H2,1-3H3,(H,20,25)/t10-,11-,13+/m0/s1; Key:ACSQLTBPYZSGBA-GMXVVIOVSA-N

Olorinab (APD371) is a drug being developed by Arena Pharmaceuticals for the treatment of gastrointestinal pain associated with Crohn's disease and irritable bowel syndrome. It acts as a potent and selective cannabinoid CB_{2} receptor agonist and is claimed to be orally active and peripherally selective. Initial Phase IIa exploratory clinical trials have been successful in patients with quiescent Crohn's disease. Arena initiated the Phase IIb Captivate trial in late July 2019 in patients with irritable bowel syndrome related pain, in constipation and diarrhea predominant sub-types. The Phase IIb trial is expected to enroll 240 participants between the ages of 18 and 70.Three doses of 10 mg, 25 mg, and 50 mg are being tested against Placebo in a 3:4 prescription ratio with a Quadruple (Participant, Care Provider, Investigator, Outcomes Assessor) masking layout.

In 2019, a study showed that Olorinab reduces Visceral Hypersensitivity in the TNBS-induced colitis animal model, attempting to control for its mechanism of action by using a CB2 antagonist (SR-144,528). Results were favorable showing reduced visceral hypersensitivity in animal models of IBD and IBS but not in healthy controls, suggesting that activation of CB2 causes antinociceptive actions in visceral sensory pathways in models of IBD and IBS. Also, SR-144528 prevented olorinab-induced inhibition of colonic nociceptor hypersensitivity, further validating the role of the CB2 receptor in nociception.

== See also ==
- MDMB-FUBINACA (similar structure but agonist at both CB_{1} and CB_{2} receptors)
- NESS-040C5
- Tedalinab
