= FUBIMINA =

Chemical compound

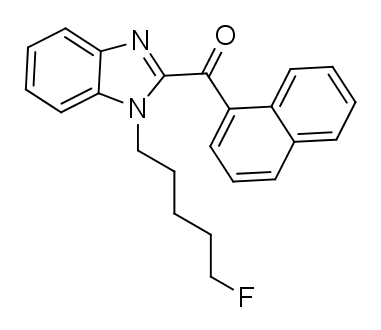

Legal status
- Legal status: CA: Schedule II; DE: NpSG (Industrial and scientific use only); UK: Class B

Identifiers
- IUPAC name: (1-(5-fluoropentyl)-1H-benzo[d]imidazol-2-yl)(naphthalen-1-yl)methanone
- CAS Number: 1984789-90-3
- PubChem CID: 124519316
- ChemSpider: 30646758
- UNII: U96GD9R3UZ

Chemical and physical data
- Formula: C_{23}H_{21}FN_{2}O
- Molar mass: 360.432 g·mol^{−1}
- 3D model (JSmol): Interactive image
- SMILES: O=C(C1=NC2=C(C=CC=C2)N1CCCCCF)C3=CC=CC4=CC=CC=C43
- InChI: InChI=1S/C23H21FN2O/c24-15-6-1-7-16-26-21-14-5-4-13-20(21)25-23(26)22(27)19-12-8-10-17-9-2-3-11-18(17)19/h2-5,8-14H,1,6-7,15-16H2; Key:KUESSZMROAFKQJ-UHFFFAOYSA-N

FUBIMINA (also known as BIM-2201, BZ-2201 and FTHJ) is a synthetic cannabinoid that is the benzimidazole analog of AM-2201 and has been used as an active ingredient in synthetic cannabis products. It was first identified in Japan in 2013, alongside MEPIRAPIM.

FUBIMINA acts as a reasonably potent agonist for the CB_{2} receptor (K_{i} = 23.45 nM), with 12x selectivity over CB_{1} (K_{i} = 296.1 nM), and does not fully substitute for Δ^{9}-THC in rat discrimination studies.

Related benzimidazole derivatives have been reported to be highly selective agonists for the CB_{2} receptor.

== See also ==
- AM-694
- AM-1235
- AM-2232
- AM-2233
- BIM-018
- JWH-018
- List of AM cannabinoids
- List of JWH cannabinoids
- THJ-2201
