= S-444,823 =

Chemical compound

Clinical data
- ATC code: none

Identifiers
- IUPAC name: 3-(2-(1-(cyclohexylmethyl)-2-oxo-1,2,5,6,7,8,9,10-octahydrocycloocta[b]pyridine-3-carboxamido)thiazol-4-yl)propanoic acid
- CAS Number: 885490-15-3
- PubChem CID: 57387465
- ChemSpider: 28501432
- UNII: NVJ8QDQ4QW

Chemical and physical data
- Formula: C_{25}H_{33}N_{3}O_{4}S
- Molar mass: 471.62 g·mol^{−1}
- 3D model (JSmol): Interactive image
- SMILES: O=C(C(C(NC1=NC(CCC(O)=O)=CS1)=O)=C2)N(CC3CCCCC3)C4=C2CCCCCC4
- InChI: InChI=1S/C25H33N3O4S/c29-22(30)13-12-19-16-33-25(26-19)27-23(31)20-14-18-10-6-1-2-7-11-21(18)28(24(20)32)15-17-8-4-3-5-9-17/h14,16-17H,1-13,15H2,(H,29,30)(H,26,27,31); Key:SYBONVBDFTYUQP-UHFFFAOYSA-N

S-444,823 is a drug developed by Shionogi which is a cannabinoid agonist. It was developed as an antipruritic, and has moderate selectivity for the CB_{2} subtype, having a CB_{2} affinity of 18nM, and 32x selectivity over the CB_{1} receptor. In animal studies it showed analgesic effects and strongly reduced itching responses, but without producing side effects such as sedation and catalepsy that are seen with centrally acting CB_{1} agonists.

== See also ==
- JTE 7-31
- RQ-00202730
- S-777,469
