= JTE-907 =

Chemical compound

Legal status
- Legal status: CA: Schedule II

Identifiers
- IUPAC name: N-(benzo[1,3]dioxol-5-ylmethyl)-7-methoxy-2-oxo-8-pentyloxy-1,2-dihydroquinoline-3-carboxamide
- CAS Number: 282089-49-0
- PubChem CID: 9867770
- ChemSpider: 8043461
- UNII: DAV3Q7SNOL
- CompTox Dashboard (EPA): DTXSID001010010
- ECHA InfoCard: 100.209.196

Chemical and physical data
- Formula: C_{24}H_{26}N_{2}O_{6}
- Molar mass: 438.480 g·mol^{−1}
- 3D model (JSmol): Interactive image
- SMILES: c4c3OCOc3ccc4CNC(=O)c(cc2ccc1OC)c(=O)[nH]c2c1OCCCCC
- InChI: InChI=1S/C24H26N2O6/c1-3-4-5-10-30-22-19(29-2)9-7-16-12-17(24(28)26-21(16)22)23(27)25-13-15-6-8-18-20(11-15)32-14-31-18/h6-9,11-12H,3-5,10,13-14H2,1-2H3,(H,25,27)(H,26,28); Key:GRAJFFFXJYFVOC-UHFFFAOYSA-N

JTE-907 is a drug used in scientific research that acts as a selective CB_{2} inverse agonist. It has anti-inflammatory effects in animal studies, thought to be mediated by an interaction between the CB_{2} receptor and IgE.

== See also ==
- JTE 7-31
