= RQ-00202730 =

Chemical structure

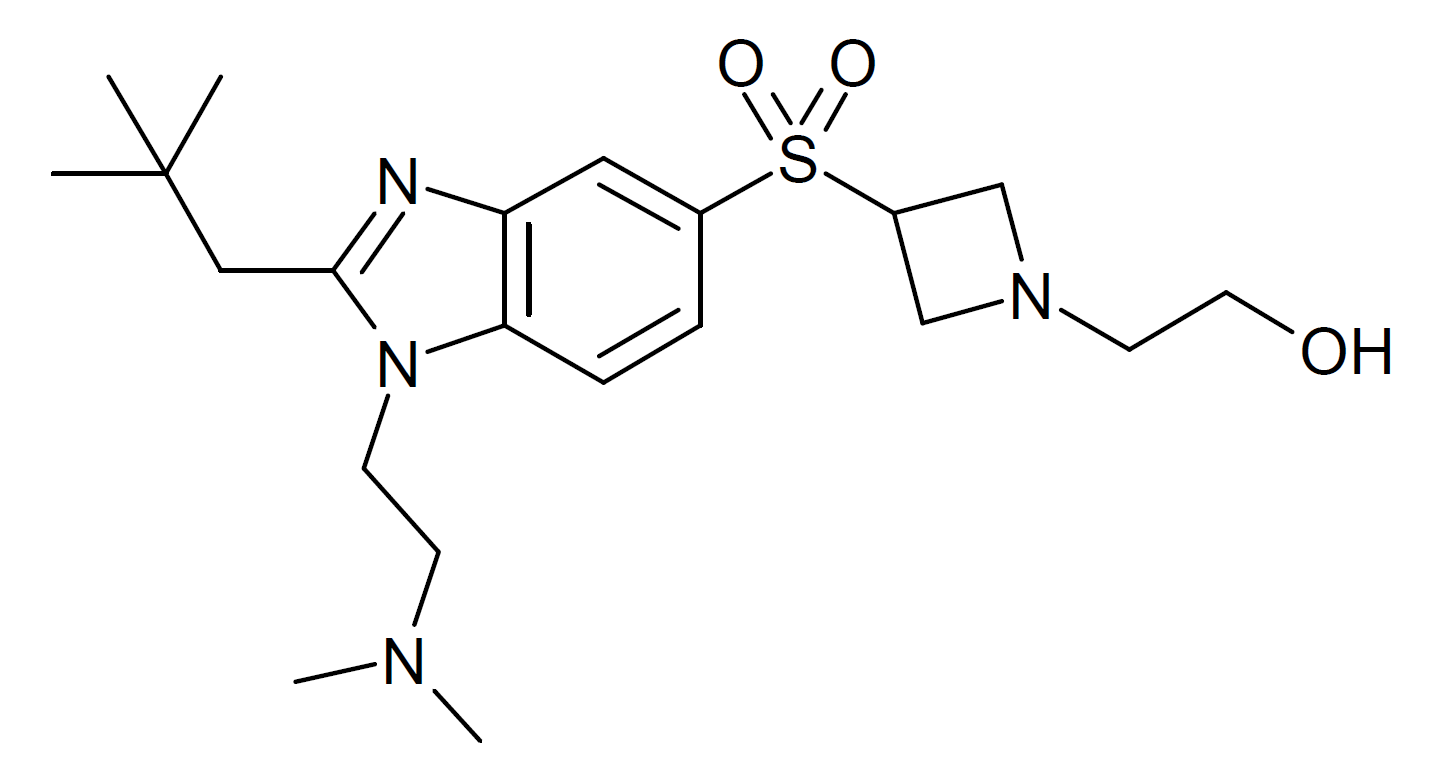

Identifiers
- IUPAC name: 2-[3-[1-[2-(dimethylamino)ethyl]-2-(2,2-dimethylpropyl)benzimidazol-5-yl]sulfonylazetidin-1-yl]ethanol
- CAS Number: 1236006-97-5
- PubChem CID: 46852212
- ChEMBL: ChEMBL3357391
- CompTox Dashboard (EPA): DTXSID101336641

Chemical and physical data
- Formula: C_{21}H_{34}N_{4}O_{3}S
- Molar mass: 422.59 g·mol^{−1}
- 3D model (JSmol): Interactive image
- SMILES: CC(C)(C)CC1=NC2=C(N1CCN(C)C)C=CC(=C2)S(=O)(=O)C3CN(C3)CCO
- InChI: InChI=1S/C21H34N4O3S/c1-21(2,3)13-20-22-18-12-16(6-7-19(18)25(20)9-8-23(4)5)29(27,28)17-14-24(15-17)10-11-26/h6-7,12,17,26H,8-11,13-15H2,1-5H3; Key:OAYGNQGEUIFBFA-UHFFFAOYSA-N

RQ-00202730 is a benzimidazole derived drug that acts as a potent and highly selective agonist for the CB_{2} cannabinoid receptor, with a K_{i} value of 19nM at CB_{2} and more than 4000x selectivity over CB_{1}, though it also shows some activity as an antagonist of the unrelated 5-HT_{2B} serotonin receptor. It has analgesic and antiinflammatory effects in animal studies, and was developed for the treatment of irritable bowel syndrome, but was ultimately discontinued from development following disappointing results in Phase II clinical trials.

== See also ==
- AZ-11713908
- AZD-1940
- JTE 7-31
- MCHB-1
