= AM-1241 =

Chemical compound

Legal status
- Legal status: CA: Schedule II; DE: NpSG (Industrial and scientific use only); UK: Under Psychoactive Substances Act

Identifiers
- IUPAC name: (2-Iodo-5-nitrophenyl)-[1-[(1-methylpiperidin-2-yl)methyl]indol-3-yl]methanone
- CAS Number: 444912-48-5
- PubChem CID: 10141893
- IUPHAR/BPS: 3316
- ChemSpider: 8317404
- UNII: DLM851L3RD
- ChEMBL: ChEMBL408430
- CompTox Dashboard (EPA): DTXSID301017015
- ECHA InfoCard: 100.164.689

Chemical and physical data
- Formula: C_{22}H_{22}IN_{3}O_{3}
- Molar mass: 503.340 g·mol^{−1}
- 3D model (JSmol): Interactive image
- SMILES: Ic2ccc(N(=O)=O)cc2C(=O)c(c4ccccc14)cn1CC3CCCCN3C
- InChI: InChI=1S/C22H22IN3O3/c1-24-11-5-4-6-16(24)13-25-14-19(17-7-2-3-8-21(17)25)22(27)18-12-15(26(28)29)9-10-20(18)23/h2-3,7-10,12,14,16H,4-6,11,13H2,1H3; Key:ZUHIXXCLLBMBDW-UHFFFAOYSA-N

AM-1241 (1-(methylpiperidin-2-ylmethyl)-3-(2-iodo-5-nitrobenzoyl)indole) is a chemical from the aminoalkylindole family that acts as a potent and selective agonist for the cannabinoid receptor CB_{2}, with a K_{i} of 3.4 nM at CB_{2} and 80 times selectivity over the related CB_{1} receptor. It has analgesic effects in animal studies, particularly against "atypical" pain such as hyperalgesia and allodynia. This is thought to be mediated through CB_{2}-mediated peripheral release of endogenous opioid peptides, as well as direct activation of the TRPA1 channel. It has also shown efficacy in the treatment of amyotrophic lateral sclerosis in animal models.

== Effects in bone cancer model ==
The antihyperalgesic effects of AM-1241 were investigated in a murine bone cancer model. Sarcoma cells were injected into the femur of a mouse, and then mice were injected twice daily with AM-1241. Treatment with AM-1241 reduced both spontaneous and evoked pain, as well as reducing the bone loss and subsequent fractures due to the tumor. Pretreatment with the CB_{2} antagonist SR-144,528 reversed the acute effects of AM-1241 on both spontaneous and evoked pain, while having no effect on its own.

== See also ==
- AM-1220
- AM-1248
- AM-2233
