= AM-919 =

Chemical compound

Identifiers
- IUPAC name: (6S,6aR,9R,10aR)-9-(Hydroxymethyl)-6-(3-hydroxypropyl)-6-methyl-3-(2-methyloctan-2-yl)-6a,7,8,9,10,10a-hexahydrobenzo[c]chromen-1-ol
- CAS Number: 164228-46-0
- PubChem CID: 10741414
- ChemSpider: 8916745
- UNII: 52KD6XK4KF
- ChEMBL: ChEMBL121118
- CompTox Dashboard (EPA): DTXSID001027479

Chemical and physical data
- Formula: C_{27}H_{44}O_{4}
- Molar mass: 432.645 g·mol^{−1}
- 3D model (JSmol): Interactive image
- SMILES: OCCCC3(C)C1CCC(CO)CC1c2c(O3)cc(cc2O)C(C)(C)CCCCCC
- InChI: InChI=1S/C27H44O4/c1-5-6-7-8-12-26(2,3)20-16-23(30)25-21-15-19(18-29)10-11-22(21)27(4,13-9-14-28)31-24(25)17-20/h16-17,19,21-22,28-30H,5-15,18H2,1-4H3/t19-,21-,22-,27+/m1/s1; Key:PHILDZBONNKMNU-UOTIDGTBSA-N

AM-919 (part of the AM cannabinoid series) is an analgesic drug which is a cannabinoid receptor agonist. It is a derivative of HU-210 which has been substituted with a 6β-(3-hydroxypropyl) group. This adds a "southern" aliphatic hydroxyl group to the molecule as seen in the CP-series of nonclassical cannabinoid drugs, and so AM-919 represents a hybrid structure between the classical dibenzopyran and nonclassical cannabinoid families.

AM-919 is somewhat less potent than HU-210 itself, but is still a potent agonist at both CB_{1} and CB_{2} with moderate selectivity for CB_{1}, with a K_{i} of 2.2 nM at CB_{1} and 3.4 nM at CB_{2}.

== See also ==
- AM-4030
