= ADB-FUBIATA =

Chemical compound

Legal status
- Legal status: BR: Class F2 (Prohibited psychotropics)

Identifiers
- IUPAC name: (2S)-2-[[2-[1-[(4-fluorophenyl)methyl]indol-3-yl]acetyl]amino]-3,3-dimethylbutanamide
- CAS Number: 2938025-73-9
- PubChem CID: 165361558
- ChemSpider: 114876989
- UNII: JK42U6CPT3
- CompTox Dashboard (EPA): DTXSID301342377

Chemical and physical data
- Formula: C_{23}H_{26}FN_{3}O_{2}
- Molar mass: 395.478 g·mol^{−1}
- 3D model (JSmol): Interactive image
- SMILES: CC(C)(C)[C@@H](C(=O)N)NC(=O)CC1=CN(C2=CC=CC=C21)CC3=CC=C(C=C3)F
- InChI: InChI=1S/C23H26FN3O2/c1-23(2,3)21(22(25)29)26-20(28)12-16-14-27(19-7-5-4-6-18(16)19)13-15-8-10-17(24)11-9-15/h4-11,14,21H,12-13H2,1-3H3,(H2,25,29)(H,26,28)/t21-/m1/s1; Key:KHAUCCNSUMBFOT-OAQYLSRUSA-N

ADB-FUBIATA (AD-18, FUB-ACADB, ADB-FUBIACA) is a synthetic cannabinoid compound first identified in 2021. It is closely related in structure to the older compound ADB-FUBICA but with the amide linker group extended by the addition of a methylene bridge. It started to be sold as an ingredient in grey-market synthetic cannabis blends following the introduction of legislation in China which for the first time introduced general controls on various classes of synthetic cannabinoids, but did not encompass compounds where the linker group had been extended in this fashion. ADB-FUBIATA has many times lower affinity for cannabinoid receptors than ADB-FUBICA with an EC_{50} of only 635 nM at CB_{1}, but retains full agonist activity at this target, while being practically inactive at CB_{2}. ADB-FUBIATA is a tryptamine derivative, but is completely inactive as an agonist of the serotonin 5-HT_{2A} receptor.

== Legality ==
In the United States ADB-FUBIATA is unscheduled at the federal level as of May 22, 2023 but may be considered under the federal analogue act if sold for human consumption. North Dakota has placed ADB-FUBIATA into Schedule I on 04/27/2023.

== See also ==
- ADB-FUBHQUCA
