= AM-4030 =

Chemical compound

Identifiers
- IUPAC name: (6S,6aR,9R,10aR)-9-(hydroxymethyl)-6-[(E)-3-hydroxyprop-1-enyl]-6-methyl-3-(2-methyloctan-2-yl)-6a,7,8,9,10,10a-hexahydrobenzo[c]chromen-1-ol
- CAS Number: 587023-54-9
- PubChem CID: 10550598
- ChemSpider: 8725989
- UNII: CGYGFRRXKK
- CompTox Dashboard (EPA): DTXSID001027481

Chemical and physical data
- Formula: C_{27}H_{42}O_{4}
- Molar mass: 430.629 g·mol^{−1}
- 3D model (JSmol): Interactive image
- SMILES: OCC=CC3(C)C1CCC(CO)CC1c2c(O3)cc(cc2O)C(C)(C)CCCCCC
- InChI: InChI=1S/C27H42O4/c1-5-6-7-8-12-26(2,3)20-16-23(30)25-21-15-19(18-29)10-11-22(21)27(4,13-9-14-28)31-24(25)17-20/h9,13,16-17,19,21-22,28-30H,5-8,10-12,14-15,18H2,1-4H3/b13-9+/t19-,21-,22-,27+/m1/s1; Key:SYKOWCSKDYZBIL-BKTWVJDESA-N

AM-4030 is an analgesic drug which is a cannabinoid receptor agonist. It is a derivative of HU-210 which has been substituted with a 6β-((E)-3-hydroxyprop-1-enyl) group. This adds a "southern" aliphatic hydroxyl group to the molecule as seen in the CP-series of nonclassical cannabinoid drugs, and so AM-4030 represents a hybrid structure between the classical and nonclassical cannabinoid families, with the 6-hydroxyalkyl chain rigidified with a double bond with defined stereochemistry. This gives AM-4030 a greater degree of selectivity, so while it is still a potent agonist at both CB_{1} and CB_{2}, it is reasonably selective for CB_{1}, with a K_{i} of 0.7nM at CB_{1} and 8.6nM at CB_{2}, a selectivity of around 12x. Resolution of the enantiomers of AM-4030 yields an even more potent compound, although with less selectivity, with the (−) enantiomer AM-4030a having a K_{i} of 0.6nM at CB_{1} and 1.1nM at CB_{2}.

== See also ==
- AM-919
- AM-938
