= ADB-FUBICA =

Chemical compound

Legal status
- Legal status: CA: Schedule II; DE: NpSG (Industrial and scientific use only); UK: Class B

Identifiers
- IUPAC name: (S)-N-(1-amino-3,3-dimethyl-1-oxobutan-2-yl)-1-(4-fluorobenzyl)-1H-indole-3-carboxamide
- CAS Number: 1801338-23-7
- PubChem CID: 129601417
- ChemSpider: 128910441
- UNII: S3ABP24K72
- CompTox Dashboard (EPA): DTXSID801032636

Chemical and physical data
- Formula: C_{22}H_{24}FN_{3}O_{2}
- Molar mass: 381.451 g·mol^{−1}
- 3D model (JSmol): Interactive image
- SMILES: O=C(C1=CN(CC2=CC=C(F)C=C2)C3=C1C=CC=C3)N[C@@H](C(C)(C)C)C(N)=O
- InChI: InChI=1S/C22H24FN3O2/c1-22(2,3)19(20(24)27)25-21(28)17-13-26(18-7-5-4-6-16(17)18)12-14-8-10-15(23)11-9-14/h4-11,13,19H,12H2,1-3H3,(H2,24,27)(H,25,28)/t19-/m1/s1; Key:QIFOZYUACLDTAJ-LJQANCHMSA-N

ADB-FUBICA is a drug that acts as a potent agonist for the cannabinoid receptors, with EC_{50} values of 2.6 nM at CB_{1} and 3.0 nM at CB_{2}.

== See also ==
- AB-FUBICA
- AB-FUBINACA
- ADB-FUBINACA
- ADB-FUBIATA
- ADB-FUBHQUCA
