= UR-144 =

Chemical compound

Clinical data
- Trade names: different brandnames, typical example: "TMCP-018", "KM-X1", "UR-144", "MN-001", "YX-17"

Legal status
- Legal status: BR: Class F2 (Prohibited psychotropics); CA: Schedule II; DE: Anlage II (Authorized trade only, not prescriptible); NZ: Temporary Class; UK: Class B; US: Schedule I

Identifiers
- IUPAC name: (1-pentylindol-3-yl)-(2,2,3,3-tetramethylcyclopropyl)methanone
- CAS Number: 1199943-44-6
- PubChem CID: 44626619
- ChemSpider: 24634882
- UNII: 1TYA7HVP1B
- KEGG: C22781
- ChEMBL: ChEMBL571773
- CompTox Dashboard (EPA): DTXSID60152635

Chemical and physical data
- Formula: C_{21}H_{29}NO
- Molar mass: 311.469 g·mol^{−1}
- 3D model (JSmol): Interactive image
- SMILES: CCCCCN1C=C(C2=CC=CC=C21)C(=O)C3C(C3(C)C)(C)C
- InChI: InChI=1S/C21H29NO/c1-6-7-10-13-22-14-16(15-11-8-9-12-17(15)22)18(23)19-20(2,3)21(19,4)5/h8-9,11-12,14,19H,6-7,10,13H2,1-5H3; Key:NBMMIBNZVQFQEO-UHFFFAOYSA-N

UR-144 (TMCP-018, KM-X1, MN-001, YX-17) is a drug invented by Abbott Laboratories, that acts as a selective full agonist of the peripheral cannabinoid receptor CB_{2}, but with much lower affinity for the psychoactive CB_{1} receptor.

== Pharmacology ==
UR-144 has high affinity for the CB_{2} receptor with a K_{i} of 1.8 nM but 83x lower affinity for the CB_{1} receptor with a K_{i} of 150 nM. UR-144 was found to possess an EC_{50} of 421 nM for human CB_{1} receptors, and 72 nM for human CB_{2} receptors. UR-144 produces bradycardia and hypothermia in rats at a dose of 10 mg/kg, suggesting weak cannabinoid-like activity.

Chemically it is closely related to other 2,2,3,3-tetramethylcyclopropyl synthetic cannabinoids like A-796,260 and A-834,735 but with a different substitution on the 1-position of the indole core, in these compounds its 1-pentyl group is replaced with alkylheterocycles like 1-(2-morpholinoethyl) and 1-(tetrahydropyran-4-ylmethyl).

== Legality ==
The UK ACMD recommended that generic prohibition legislation be extended to include UR-144 in October 2012. The UK Home Office accepted the recommendation and enacted legislation to ban UR-144 as a class B drug along with a number of other drugs on February 26, 2013, as a part of The Misuse of Drugs Act 1971 (Amendment) Order 2013.

UR-144 was detected in Korea, 2012. This molecule is very close to KM-X1, MN-001, YX-17 and Kr-11.

UR-144 (Abbott patent) has been detected as an ingredient of synthetic cannabis smoking blends in New Zealand, and subsequently banned from sale as a temporary class drug on 6 April 2012. It has also been encountered in smoking blends and subsequently banned in Russia.

As of October 2015 UR-144 is a controlled substance in China.

UR-144 is banned in the Czech Republic.

== Detection ==
A forensic standard of UR-144 is available, and the compound has been posted on the Forendex website of potential drugs of abuse. An ELISA immunoassay technique for detecting UR-144 in urine as part of general drug screens has been developed by Tulip Biolabs, Inc. An Homogeneous Immunoassay that runs on most Clinical Chemistry Analyzers and detects several UR and XLR synthetic cannabinoids has been developed and introduced by Immunalysis Inc. Pomona USA.

== See also ==
- AB-001
- AM-1221
- 4-HTMPIPO
- FAB-144
- JTE 7-31
- JWH-018
- N-(S)-Fenchyl-1-(2-morpholinoethyl)-7-methoxyindole-3-carboxamide
- XLR-11
- Tetramethylcyclopropylfentanyl
