= AM-855 =

Analgesic drug

Identifiers
- IUPAC name: (4aR,12bR)-8-hexyl-2,5,5-trimethyl-1,4,4a,8,9,10,11,12b-octahydronaphtho[3,2-c]isochromen-12-ol
- CAS Number: 249888-50-4
- PubChem CID: 10091328
- ChemSpider: 8266865
- UNII: JA784TPZ1U
- ChEMBL: ChEMBL303479

Chemical and physical data
- Formula: C_{26}H_{38}O_{2}
- Molar mass: 382.588 g·mol^{−1}
- 3D model (JSmol): Interactive image
- SMILES: Oc1c4C2CC(C)=CCC2C(C)(C)Oc4cc3c1CCCC3CCCCCC
- InChI: InChI=1S/C26H38O2/c1-5-6-7-8-10-18-11-9-12-19-20(18)16-23-24(25(19)27)21-15-17(2)13-14-22(21)26(3,4)28-23/h13,16,18,21-22,27H,5-12,14-15H2,1-4H3/t18?,21-,22-/m1/s1; Key:GAAJNVWIOIOMPO-IPKCRJEZSA-N

AM-855 (part of the AM cannabinoid series) is an analgesic drug which is a cannabinoid agonist. It is a derivative of Δ^{8}Tetrahydrocannabinol with a conformationally restricted side chain which has been bound into a fourth ring fused to the aromatic A-ring of the cannabinoid skeleton. AM-855 is an agonist at both CB_{1} and CB_{2} with moderate selectivity for CB_{1}, with a K_{i} of 22.3 nM at CB_{1} and 58.6 nM at CB_{2}.
