= Pravadoline =

Chemical compound

Clinical data
- ATC code: none

Legal status
- Legal status: In general: legal

Identifiers
- IUPAC name: (4-Methoxyphenyl)-[2-methyl-1-(2-morpholin-4-ylethyl)indol-3-yl]methanone
- CAS Number: 92623-83-1
- PubChem CID: 56463
- ChemSpider: 50942
- UNII: P3JW662TWA
- ChEMBL: ChEMBL13178
- CompTox Dashboard (EPA): DTXSID2046127

Chemical and physical data
- Formula: C_{23}H_{26}N_{2}O_{3}
- Molar mass: 378.472 g·mol^{−1}
- 3D model (JSmol): Interactive image
- SMILES: O=C(c1ccc(OC)cc1)c2c4ccccc4n(c2C)CCN3CCOCC3
- InChI: InChI=1S/C23H26N2O3/c1-17-22(23(26)18-7-9-19(27-2)10-8-18)20-5-3-4-6-21(20)25(17)12-11-24-13-15-28-16-14-24/h3-10H,11-16H2,1-2H3; Key:MEUQWHZOUDZXHH-UHFFFAOYSA-N

Pravadoline (WIN 48,098) is an anti-inflammatory and analgesic drug with an IC_{50} of 4.9 μM and a K_{i} of 2511 nM at CB_{1}, related in structure to nonsteroidal anti-inflammatory drugs (NSAIDs) such as indometacin. It was developed in the 1980s as a new antiinflammatory and prostaglandin synthesis inhibitor, acting through inhibition of the enzyme cyclooxygenase (COX).

However, pravadoline was found to exhibit unexpectedly strong analgesic effects, which appeared at doses ten times smaller than the effective anti-inflammatory dose and so could not be explained by its action as a COX inhibitor. These effects were not blocked by opioid antagonists such as naloxone, and it was eventually discovered that pravadoline represented the first compound from a novel class of synthetic cannabinoids, the aminoalkylindoles.

Pravadoline was never developed for use as an analgesic, partly due to toxicity concerns (although these were later shown to be a result of the salt form that the drug had been prepared in rather than from the pravadoline itself), however the discovery of cannabinoid activity in this structurally novel family of drugs led to the discovery of several new cannabinoid agonists, including the drug WIN 55,212-2, which is now widely used in scientific research.

== Animal studies ==
Administration of pravadoline on rats showed:

- Prolonged the response latency induced by tail immersion in hot water at a temperature of 55 °C (minimum effective dose 100 mg/kg s.c.)
- Prevented hyperalgesia in rats with brewer's yeast injections during (Randall-Selitto test) (minimum effective dose 1 mg/kg, p.o.)
- Prevented the nociceptive response induced by paw flexion in the adjuvant-arthritic rat (ED_{50} 41 mg/kg, p.o.)
- Prevented the nociceptive response of bradykinin-induced head and forepaw flexion (ED_{50} 78 mg/kg, p.o.)

The antinociceptive activity of pravadoline cannot be explained by an opioid mechanism, because pravadoline-induced antinociception was not antagonized by naloxone (1 mg/kg, s.c.) and pravadoline did not bind to the opioid receptors at concentrations up to 10 μM.

== See also ==
- AM-630 (6-iodopravadoline)
- WIN 54,461 (6-bromopravadoline)
- WIN 55,212-2
- RCS-4 (1-pentyl-3-(4-methoxybenzoyl)indole)
