= A-834,735 =

Chemical compound

Legal status
- Legal status: UK: Class B

Identifiers
- IUPAC name: {1-[(Tetrahydro-2H-pyran-4-yl)methyl]-1H-indol-3-yl}-(2,2,3,3-tetramethylcyclopropyl)methanone
- CAS Number: 895155-57-4
- PubChem CID: 11544639
- ChemSpider: 9719418
- UNII: XE27L67C93
- ChEMBL: ChEMBL271158
- CompTox Dashboard (EPA): DTXSID60468349

Chemical and physical data
- Formula: C_{22}H_{29}NO_{2}
- Molar mass: 339.479 g·mol^{−1}
- 3D model (JSmol): Interactive image
- SMILES: C4COCCC4Cn(c3)c2ccccc2c3C(=O)C1C(C)(C)C1(C)C
- InChI: InChI=1S/C22H29NO2/c1-21(2)20(22(21,3)4)19(24)17-14-23(13-15-9-11-25-12-10-15)18-8-6-5-7-16(17)18/h5-8,14-15,20H,9-13H2,1-4H3; Key:NQTMRZNYLIGQCF-UHFFFAOYSA-N

A-834,735 is a drug developed by Abbott Laboratories that acts as a potent cannabinoid receptor full agonist at both the CB_{1} and CB_{2} receptors, with a K_{i} of 12 nM at CB_{1} and 0.21 nM at CB_{2}. Replacing the aromatic 3-benzoyl or 3-naphthoyl group found in most indole derived cannabinoids with the 3-tetramethylcyclopropylmethanone group of A-834,735 and related compounds imparts significant selectivity for CB_{2}, with most compounds from this group found to be highly selective CB_{2} agonists with little affinity for CB_{1}. However, low nanomolar CB_{1} binding affinity is retained with certain heterocyclic 1-position substituents such as (N-methylpiperidin-2-yl)methyl (cf. AM-1220, AM-1248), or the (tetrahydropyran-4-yl)methyl substituent of A-834,735, resulting in compounds that still show significant affinity and efficacy at both receptors despite being CB_{2} selective overall.

== Legal status ==
As of October 2015 A-834,735 is a controlled substance in China.

== See also ==
- A-796,260
- AB-001
- AB-005
- FUB-144
- JTE 7-31
- UR-144
- XLR-11
