= Melanotan =

Melanotan may refer to one of two separate peptides:

- Afamelanotide, originally developed under the names "Melanotan", "Melanotan-1", or "Melanotan I" for skin tanning, a drug currently available for prescription for certain light related skin indications and also in trials in implant form as a prophylactic treatment for a series of light affected skin disorders and potential skin cancer preventative agent
- Melanotan II, a drug originally developed as a skin tanning agent, but subsequently investigated as a potential treatment for sexual dysfunction
