= AM-630 =

Chemical compound

Legal status
- Legal status: CA: Schedule II; DE: NpSG (Industrial and scientific use only); UK: Under Psychoactive Substances Act

Identifiers
- IUPAC name: 1-[2-(Morpholin-4-yl)ethyl]-2-methyl-3-(4-methoxybenzoyl)-6-iodoindole
- CAS Number: 164178-33-0
- PubChem CID: 4302963
- IUPHAR/BPS: 750
- ChemSpider: 3508738
- UNII: U1LNJ6NBKA
- ChEMBL: ChEMBL181633
- CompTox Dashboard (EPA): DTXSID10167719
- ECHA InfoCard: 100.229.964

Chemical and physical data
- Formula: C_{23}H_{25}IN_{2}O_{3}
- Molar mass: 504.368 g·mol^{−1}
- 3D model (JSmol): Interactive image
- SMILES: C4COCCN4CCn(c1C)c2cc(I)ccc2c1C(=O)c3ccc(OC)cc3
- InChI: InChI=1S/C23H25IN2O3/c1-16-22(23(27)17-3-6-19(28-2)7-4-17)20-8-5-18(24)15-21(20)26(16)10-9-25-11-13-29-14-12-25/h3-8,15H,9-14H2,1-2H3; Key:JHOTYHDSLIUKCJ-UHFFFAOYSA-N

AM-630 (6-Iodopravadoline) is a drug that acts as a potent and selective inverse agonist for the cannabinoid receptor CB_{2}, with a K_{i} of 32.1 nM at CB_{2} and 165x selectivity over CB_{1}, at which it acted as a weak partial agonist. It is used in the study of CB_{2} mediated responses and has been used to investigate the possible role of CB_{2} receptors in the brain. AM-630 is significant as one of the first indole derived cannabinoid ligands substituted on the 6-position of the indole ring, a position that has subsequently been found to be important in determining affinity and efficacy at both the CB_{1} and CB_{2} receptors, and has led to the development of many related derivatives.

== See also ==
- AM-1221
- Pravadoline
- WIN 54,461 (6-Bromopravadoline)
