= XLR-11 =

Chemical compound

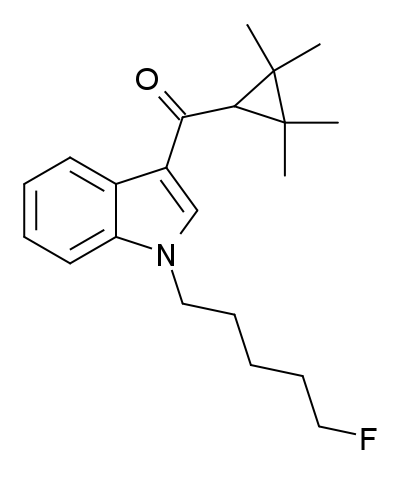

Legal status
- Legal status: BR: Class F2 (Prohibited psychotropics); CA: Schedule II; DE: Anlage II (Authorized trade only, not prescriptible); NZ: Temporary Class; UK: Class B; US: Schedule I

Identifiers
- IUPAC name: (1-(5-fluoropentyl)-1H-indol-3-yl)(2,2,3,3-tetramethylcyclopropyl)methanone
- CAS Number: 1364933-54-9
- PubChem CID: 57501498
- ChemSpider: 28537382
- UNII: L2M8B977ZE
- KEGG: C22770
- CompTox Dashboard (EPA): DTXSID00159825

Chemical and physical data
- Formula: C_{21}H_{28}FNO
- Molar mass: 329.459 g·mol^{−1}
- 3D model (JSmol): Interactive image
- SMILES: CC1(C(C1(C)C)C(=O)c2cn(c3c2cccc3)CCCCCF)C
- InChI: InChI=1S/C21H28FNO/c1-20(2)19(21(20,3)4)18(24)16-14-23(13-9-5-8-12-22)17-11-7-6-10-15(16)17/h6-7,10-11,14,19H,5,8-9,12-13H2,1-4H3; Key:PXLDPUUMIHVLEC-UHFFFAOYSA-N

XLR-11 (5"-fluoro-UR-144 or 5F-UR-144) is a drug that acts as a potent agonist for the cannabinoid receptors CB_{1} and CB_{2} with EC_{50} values of 98 nM and 83 nM, respectively. It is a 3-(tetramethylcyclopropylmethanoyl)indole derivative related to compounds such as UR-144, A-796,260 and A-834,735, but it is not specifically listed in the patent or scientific literature alongside these other similar compounds, and appears to have not previously been made by Abbott Laboratories, despite falling within the claims of patent WO 2006/069196. XLR-11 was found to produce rapid, short-lived hypothermic effects in rats at doses of 3 mg/kg and 10 mg/kg, suggesting that it is of comparable potency to APICA and STS-135.

== Detection ==
A forensic standard for this compound is available, and a representative mass spectrum has been posted on Forendex.

== Recreational use ==
XLR-11 was instead first identified by laboratories in 2012 as an ingredient in synthetic cannabis smoking blends, and appears to be a novel compound invented specifically for grey-market recreational use.

== Legal Status ==
XLR-11 was banned in New Zealand by being added to the temporary class drug schedule, as of 13 July 2012.

The U.S. Drug Enforcement Administration (DEA) made XLR11 illegal under the Federal Controlled Substances act for the foreseeable future as of January 2024.

It has also been banned in Florida as of 11 December 2012.

Arizona banned XLR-11 on 3 April 2013.

As of October 2015, XLR-11 is a controlled substance in China.

XLR-11 is banned in the Czech Republic.

== Side effects ==
XLR-11 has been linked to hospitalizations due to its use.

== Toxicity ==
XLR-11 has been linked to acute kidney injury in some users, along with AM-2201.

== See also ==
- FAB-144
- JWH-018
- STS-135
- UR-144
- XLR-12
