= JTE 7-31 =

Names
- Preferred IUPAC name 2-[2-(4-Hydroxyphenyl)ethyl]-5-methoxy-4-(pentylamino)-2,3-dihydro-1H-isoindol-1-one

Identifiers
CAS Number	194358-72-0
3D model (JSmol)	Interactive image
ChemSpider	13767708
PubChem CID	19363402
UNII	7MV5OX2NX0
CompTox Dashboard (EPA)	DTXSID50598386
- InChI: InChI=1S/C22H28N2O3/c1-3-4-5-13-23-21-19-15-24(14-12-16-6-8-17(25)9-7-16)22(26)18(19)10-11-20(21)27-2/h6-11,23,25H,3-5,12-15H2,1-2H3 Key: FMUMUYFMLZGXJR-UHFFFAOYSA-N; InChI=1/C22H28N2O3/c1-3-4-5-13-23-21-19-15-24(14-12-16-6-8-17(25)9-7-16)22(26)18(19)10-11-20(21)27-2/h6-11,23,25H,3-5,12-15H2,1-2H3 Key: FMUMUYFMLZGXJR-UHFFFAOYAA
- SMILES: Oc1ccc(cc1)CCN3Cc2c(ccc(OC)c2NCCCCC)C3=O

Properties
Chemical formula	C_{22}H_{28}N_{2}O_{3}
Molar mass	368.469 g/mol
- Except where otherwise noted, data are given for materials in their standard state (at 25 °C [77 °F], 100 kPa). verify (what is ?) Infobox references

JTE 7-31 is a selective cannabinoid receptor agonist invented by Japan Tobacco. It is a reasonably highly selective CB_{2} agonist, but still retains appreciable affinity at CB_{1}, with a K_{i} of 0.088nM at CB_{2} vs 11nM at CB_{1}.

== Legality ==
JTE 7-31 is illegal in Alabama.

== See also ==
- A-834,735
- JTE-907
- MDA-19
- N-(S)-Fenchyl-1-(2-morpholinoethyl)-7-methoxyindole-3-carboxamide
- S-444,823
- XLR-12
