= RCS-8 =

Chemical compound

Legal status
- Legal status: CA: Schedule II; DE: NpSG (Industrial and scientific use only); UK: Class B; US: Schedule I

Identifiers
- IUPAC name: 2-(2-Methoxyphenyl)-1-[1-(2-cyclohexylethyl)indol-3-yl]ethanone
- CAS Number: 1345970-42-4
- ChemSpider: 24751863
- UNII: 11030I5W3R
- CompTox Dashboard (EPA): DTXSID30158821

Chemical and physical data
- Formula: C_{25}H_{29}NO_{2}
- Molar mass: 375.512 g·mol^{−1}
- 3D model (JSmol): Interactive image
- SMILES: COc1ccccc1CC(=O)c2cn(c3c2cccc3)CCC4CCCCC4
- InChI: InChI=1S/C25H29NO2/c1-28-25-14-8-5-11-20(25)17-24(27)22-18-26(23-13-7-6-12-21(22)23)16-15-19-9-3-2-4-10-19/h5-8,11-14,18-19H,2-4,9-10,15-17H2,1H3; Key:BSQFBMXCQIKYNI-UHFFFAOYSA-N

RCS-8 (also known as 1-(2-cyclohexylethyl)-3-(2-methoxyphenylacetyl)indole, SR-18, and BTM-8) is a synthetic cannabinoid that has been found as an ingredient of "herbal smoking blends". It can be described as an analogue of JWH-250 with the 1-pentyl group replaced by 1-(2-cyclohexylethyl), and can be expected to be less potent than JWH-250. All CB_{1} receptor agonists of the 3-phenylacetylindole class such as RCS-8 are Schedule I Controlled Substances within the United States.

== See also ==
- Cannabipiperidiethanone
- JWH-250
- RCS-4
