= WIN 55,212-2 =

Chemical compound

Legal status
- Legal status: CA: Schedule II; UK: Class B; US: Schedule I

Identifiers
- IUPAC name: (11R)-2-Methyl-11-[(morpholin-4-yl)methyl]-3-(naphthalene-1-carbonyl)-9-oxa-1-azatricyclo[6.3.1.0^{4,12}]dodeca-2,4(12),5,7-tetraene
- CAS Number: 131543-22-1
- PubChem CID: 5311501
- IUPHAR/BPS: 733
- ChemSpider: 4470978
- UNII: 5H31GI9502
- ChEBI: CHEBI:73295
- ChEMBL: ChEMBL188
- CompTox Dashboard (EPA): DTXSID40894849

Chemical and physical data
- Formula: C_{27}H_{26}N_{2}O_{3}
- Molar mass: 426.516 g·mol^{−1}
- 3D model (JSmol): Interactive image
- SMILES: CC1=C(C2=C3N1[C@@H](COC3=CC=C2)CN4CCOCC4)C(=O)C5=CC=CC6=CC=CC=C65
- InChI: InChI=1S/C27H26N2O3/c1-18-25(27(30)22-9-4-7-19-6-2-3-8-21(19)22)23-10-5-11-24-26(23)29(18)20(17-32-24)16-28-12-14-31-15-13-28/h2-11,20H,12-17H2,1H3/t20-/m1/s1; Key:HQVHOQAKMCMIIM-HXUWFJFHSA-N

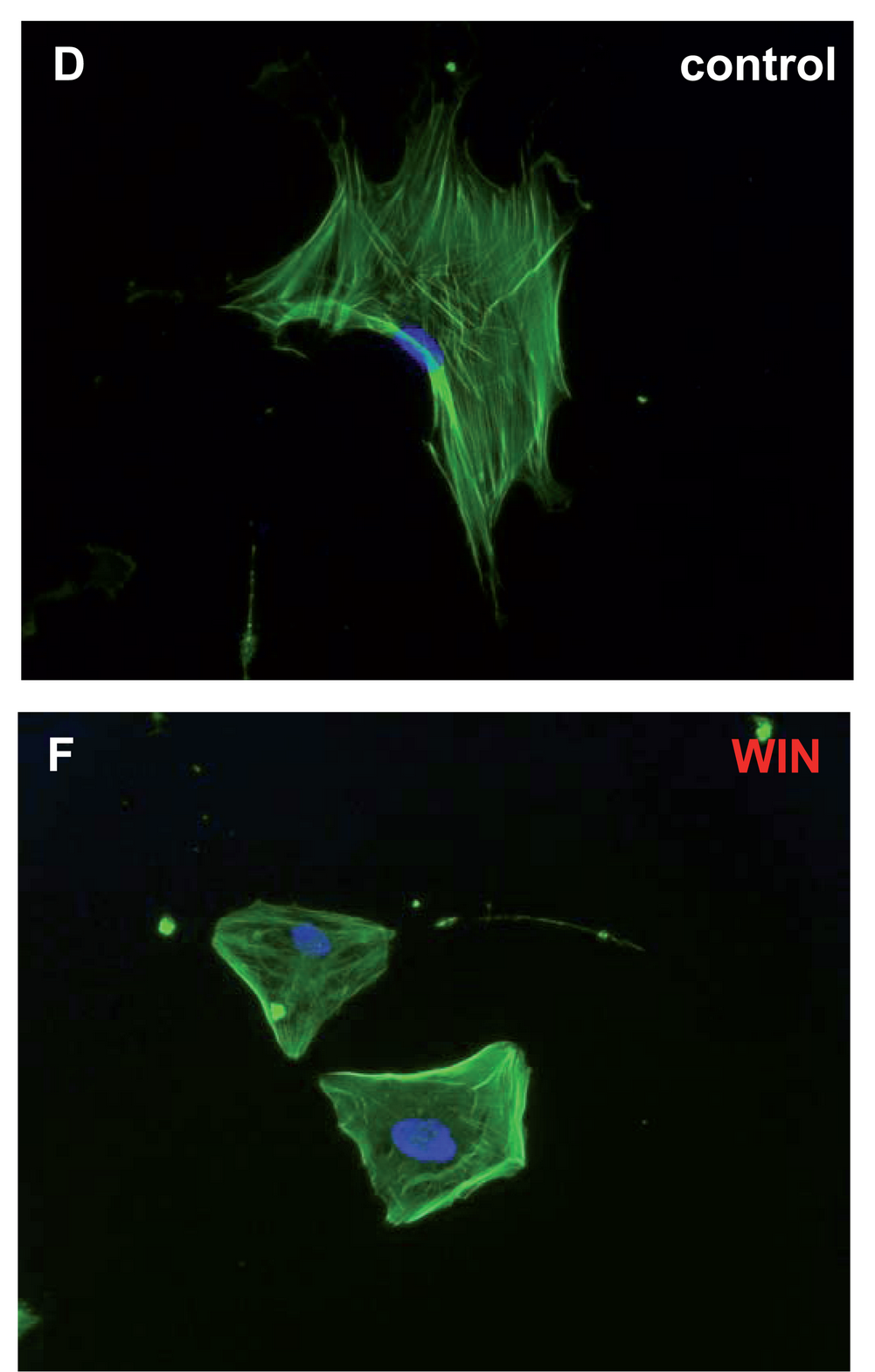
Pancreatic stellate cells. The cells in the lower frame are under the action of WIN 55,212-2. They are thought to assume a more "quiescent" phenotype. From Michalski et al., 2008.

WIN 55,212-2 is a chemical described as an aminoalkylindole derivative, which produces effects similar to those of cannabinoids such as tetrahydrocannabinol (THC) but has an entirely different chemical structure.

WIN 55,212-2 is a potent cannabinoid receptor agonist that has been found to be a potent analgesic in a rat model of neuropathic pain. It activates p42 and p44 MAP kinase via receptor-mediated signaling.

At 5 μM WIN 55,212-2 inhibits ATP production in sperm in a CB_{1} receptor-dependent fashion.

WIN 55,212-2, along with HU-210 and JWH-133, may prevent the inflammation caused by amyloid beta proteins involved in Alzheimer's disease, in addition to preventing cognitive impairment and loss of neuronal markers. This anti-inflammatory action is induced through agonist action at cannabinoid receptors, which prevents microglial activation that elicits the inflammation.

WIN 55,212-2 is a full agonist at the CB_{1} cannabinoid receptor (K_{i} = 1.9 nM) and has much higher affinity than THC (K_{i} = 41 nM) for this receptor. WIN 55,212-2 is also an agonist of the PPARα and PPARγ nuclear receptors.

WIN 55,212-2 reduces voluntary wheel running in laboratory mice, but with effects that depend on both genetic background and sex.

In the United States, all CB_{1} receptor agonists of the 3-(1-naphthoyl)indole class such as WIN 55,212-2 are Schedule I Controlled Substances. WIN 55,212-2 is illegal in the UK.

WIN 55,212-2 is also a CB2 receptor agonist and thereby, like other cannabinoid CB2 agonists, found to significantly improve cardiac recovery after ischaemia/reperfusion (I/R) in the hearts of diabetic fatty rats, by restoring coronary perfusion pressure and heart rate to pre-ischaemic levels, by the restoration of the inducible nitric oxide synthase (iNOS)/endothelial nitric oxide synthase (eNOS) cardiac equilibrium.

== See also ==
- WIN 48,098 (Pravadoline)
- WIN 54,461 (6-Bromopravadoline)
- WIN 55,225 (JWH-200)
- WIN 56,098
