= AM-1220 =

Chemical compound

Legal status
- Legal status: AU: S9 (Prohibited substance); CA: Schedule II; DE: Anlage II (Authorized trade only, not prescriptible); NZ: Temporary Class; UK: Class B; US: Schedule I

Identifiers
- IUPAC name: (R)-(1-((1-Methylpiperidin-2-yl)methyl)-1H-indol-3-yl)(naphthalen-1-yl)methanone
- CAS Number: 137642-54-7 (racemic) 134959-64-1 ((R)-enantiomer)
- PubChem CID: 9929889
- ChemSpider: 26231035
- UNII: 05850M72P2; (R)-enantiomer: 44NQ9RBE1B
- CompTox Dashboard (EPA): DTXSID50433001

Chemical and physical data
- Formula: C_{26}H_{26}N_{2}O
- Molar mass: 382.507 g·mol^{−1}
- 3D model (JSmol): Interactive image
- SMILES: O=C(C1=CC=CC2=C1C=CC=C2)C3=CN(C[C@@H]4N(C)CCCC4)C5=CC=CC=C53
- InChI: InChI=1S/C26H26N2O/c1-27-16-7-6-11-20(27)17-28-18-24(22-13-4-5-15-25(22)28)26(29)23-14-8-10-19-9-2-3-12-21(19)23/h2-5,8-10,12-15,18,20H,6-7,11,16-17H2,1H3/t20-/m1/s1; Key:URKVBEKZCMUTQC-HXUWFJFHSA-N

AM-1220 is a drug that acts as a potent and moderately selective agonist for the cannabinoid receptor CB_{1}, with around 19 times selectivity for CB_{1} over the related CB_{2} receptor. It was originally invented in the early 1990s by a team led by Thomas D'Ambra at Sterling Winthrop, but has subsequently been researched by many others, most notably the team led by Alexandros Makriyannis at the University of Connecticut. The (piperidin-2-yl)methyl side chain of AM-1220 contains a stereocenter, so there are two enantiomers with quite different potency, the (R)-enantiomer having a K_{i} of 0.27 nM at CB_{1} while the (S)-enantiomer has a much weaker K_{i} of 217 nM.

== Related compounds ==
A number of related compounds are known with similar potent cannabinoid activity, with modifications such as substitution of the indole ring at the 2- or 6-positions, the naphthoyl ring substituted at the 4-position or replaced by substituted benzoyl rings or other groups, or the 1-(N-methylpiperidin-2-ylmethyl) group replaced by similar heterocyclic groups such as N-methylpyrrolidin-2-ylmethyl or N-methylmorpholin-3-ylmethyl. AM-1220 was first detected as an ingredient of synthetic cannabis smoking blends in 2010.

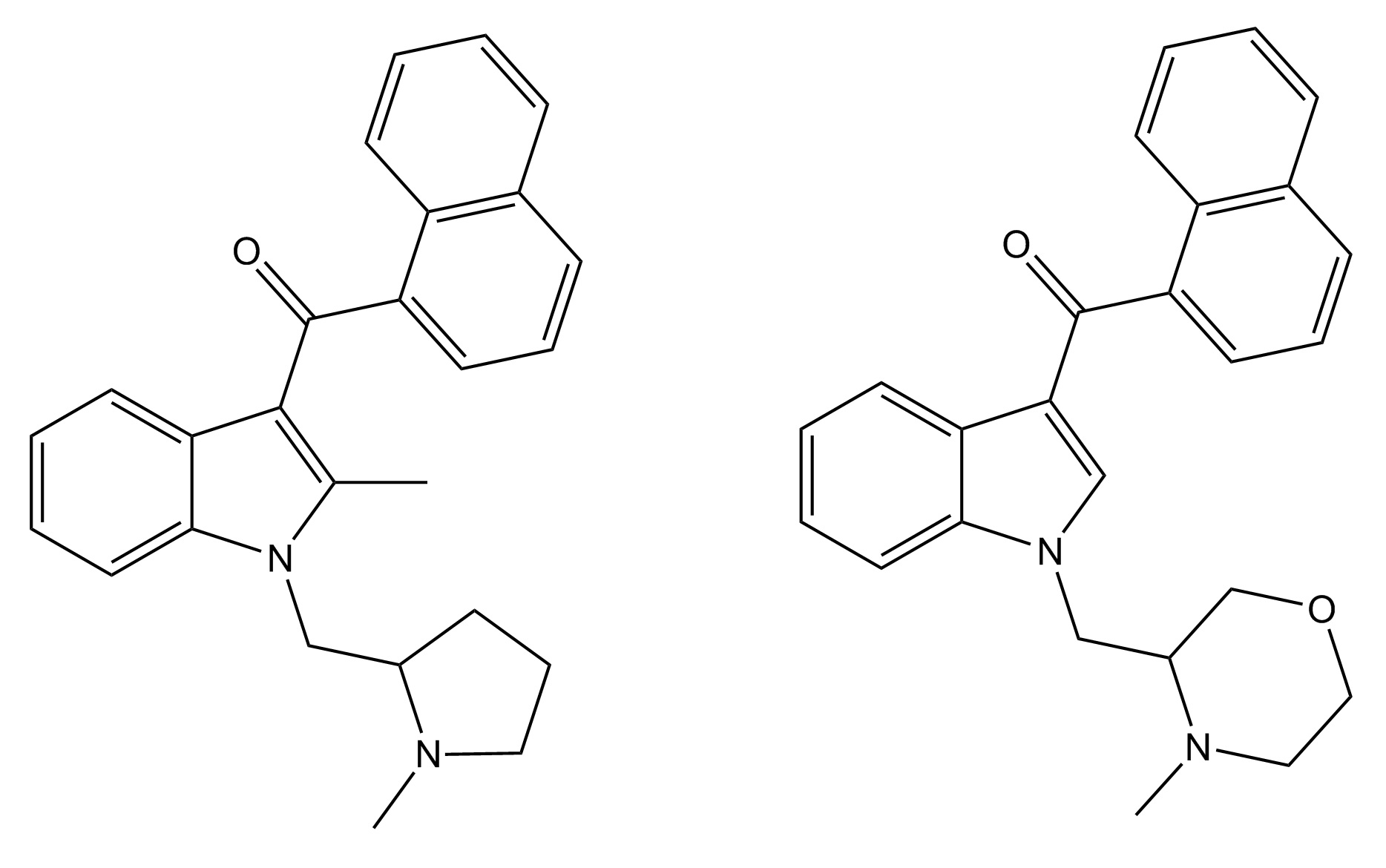
Related 1-(N-methylpyrrolidin-2-ylmethyl) and 1-(N-methylmorpholin-3-ylmethyl) derivatives

== Legal status ==
=== United States ===
in the United States of America all CB_{1} receptor agonists of the 3-(1-naphthoyl)indole class such as AM-1220 are Schedule I Controlled Substances under the Controlled Substances Act s.

=== United Kingdom ===
it's illegal to supply, smuggle, distribute, transport, sell or trade the pharmaceutical drug under the Psychoactive Substances Act 2016 which was enforced on May26th 2016.

=== China ===
As of October 2015, AM-1220 is a controlled substance in China.

== See also ==
- A-834,735
- AM-1221
- AM-1248
- AM-2201
- AM-2233
- Cannabipiperidiethanone
