= A-836,339 =

Chemical compound

Legal status
- Legal status: CA: Schedule II

Identifiers
- IUPAC name: N-[3-(2-methoxyethyl)-4,5-dimethyl-1,3-thiazol-2-ylidene]-2,2,3,3-tetramethylcyclopropane-1-carboxamide
- CAS Number: 959746-77-1
- PubChem CID: 17754357
- ChemSpider: 26286892
- UNII: Z6Y1J258EG
- CompTox Dashboard (EPA): DTXSID601010006

Chemical and physical data
- Formula: C_{16}H_{26}N_{2}O_{2}S
- Molar mass: 310.46 g·mol^{−1}
- 3D model (JSmol): Interactive image
- SMILES: Cc1c(sc(=NC(=O)C2C(C2(C)C)(C)C)n1CCOC)C
- InChI: InChI=1S/C16H26N2O2S/c1-10-11(2)21-14(18(10)8-9-20-7)17-13(19)12-15(3,4)16(12,5)6/h12H,8-9H2,1-7H3; Key:JKGIMVBQKSRTGX-UHFFFAOYSA-N

A-836,339 is a drug developed by Abbott Laboratories that acts as a potent cannabinoid receptor full agonist. It is selective for CB_{2}, with K_{i} values of 0.64 nM at CB_{2} vs 270 nM at the psychoactive CB_{1} receptor, but while it exhibits selective analgesic, anti-inflammatory and anti-hyperalgesic effects at low doses, its high efficacy at both targets results in typical cannabis-like effects appearing at higher doses, despite its low binding affinity for CB_{1}. In 2012 A-836,339 was detected via X-ray crystallography in a "dubious product" sold in Japan, though the product was described as a white powder, not herbal incense, it was suggested to be for human consumption.
