= Designer drug =

Class of recreational drugs

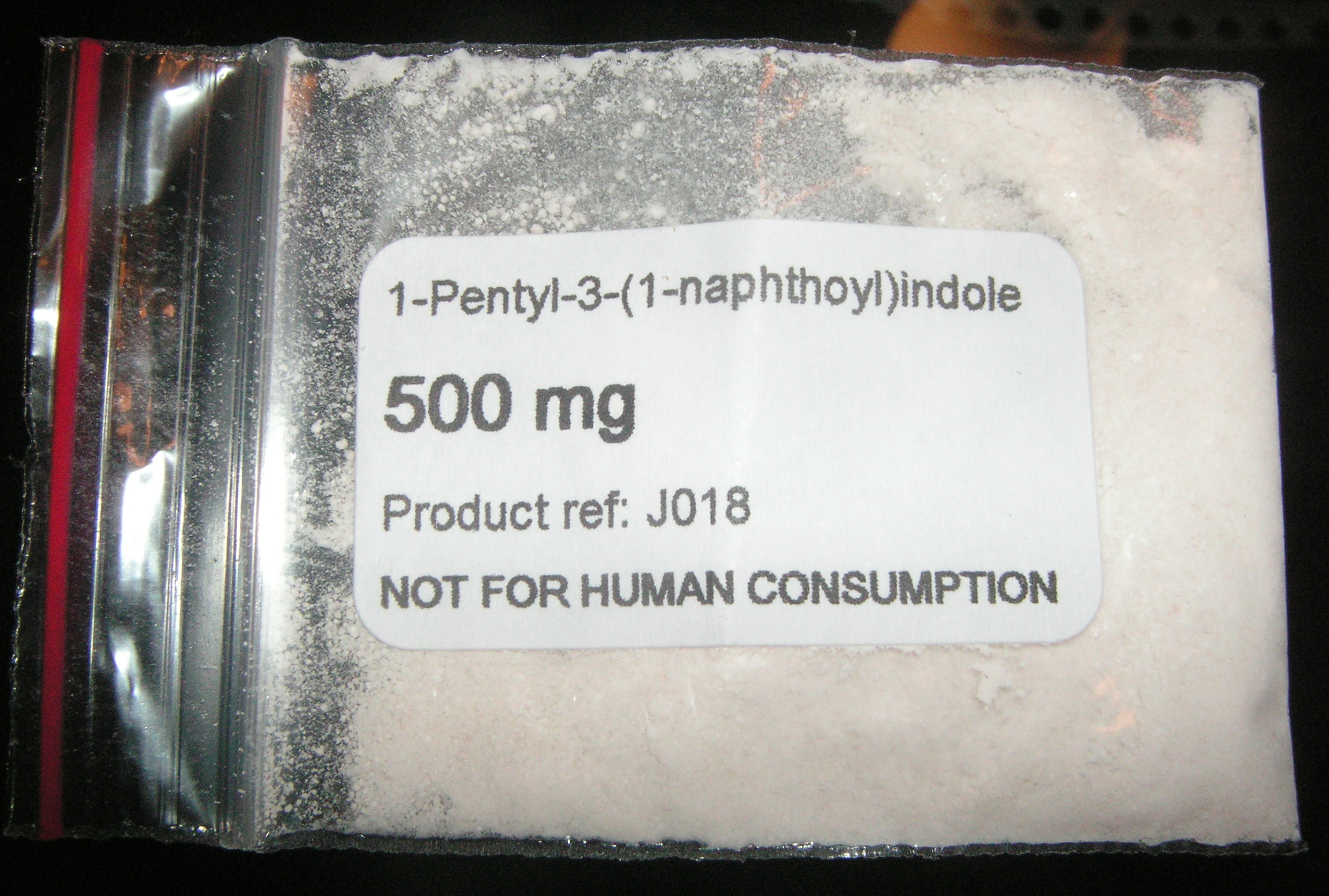
JWH-018, a popular cannabinoid

A designer drug is a structural or functional analog of a controlled substance that has been designed to mimic the pharmacological effects of the original drug, while avoiding classification as illegal and/or detection in standard drug tests. Designer drugs include psychoactive substances that have been designated by the European Union, Australia, and New Zealand, as new psychoactive substances (NPS) (Note: "New Psychoactive Substance," and "Novel Psychoactive Substance" (NPS) are often used interchangeably. The term is more commonly used in Australia, European Union, United Kingdom, and New Zealand.) as well as analogs of performance-enhancing drugs such as designer steroids.

Some designer drugs were originally synthesized by academic or industrial researchers and later emerged on the grey market for recreational use. Other designer drugs were prepared for the first time in clandestine laboratories. Many designer drugs have a short history of human use and have not been thoroughly evaluated in animal or human trials, leading to the possibility of unexpected effects and toxicities.

The development of designer drugs may be considered a subfield of drug design. The exploration of modifications to known active drugs—such as their structural analogues, stereoisomers, and derivatives—yields drugs that may differ significantly in effects from their "parent" drug (e.g., showing different potency or side effects). In some instances, designer drugs have similar pharmacology to existing drugs, but are structurally unrelated. For example, JWH-018 and THC are both CB1 agonists despite lacking substantial structural similarity.

In some jurisdictions, designer drugs may fall under analog acts which impose restrictions upon substances which are substantially chemically or pharmacologically similar to existing controlled substances.

== History ==
=== United States ===
==== 1920s–1930s ====
Following the passage of the Second International Opium Convention in 1925, which specifically banned morphine and the diacetyl ester of morphine, heroin, a number of alternative esters of morphine quickly started to be manufactured and sold. The most notable of these were dibenzoylmorphine and acetylpropionylmorphine, which have virtually identical effects to heroin but were not covered by the Opium Convention. This then led the Health Committee of the League of Nations to pass several resolutions attempting to bring these new drugs under control, ultimately leading in 1930 to the first broad analogues provisions extending legal control to all esters of morphine, oxycodone and hydromorphone. Another early example of what could loosely be termed designer drug use, was during the Prohibition era in the 1930s, when diethyl ether was sold and used as an alternative to illegal alcoholic beverages in a number of countries.

==== 1960s–1970s ====
During the 1960s and 1970s, a number of new synthetic hallucinogens were introduced, with a notable example being the sale of highly potent tablets of DOM in San Francisco in 1967. There was little scope to prosecute people over drug analogues at this time, with new compounds instead being added to the controlled drug schedules one by one as they became a problem. One significant court case from this period was in 1973, when Tim Scully and Nicholas Sand were prosecuted for making the acetyl amide of LSD, known as ALD-52. At this time ALD-52 was not a controlled drug, but they were convicted on the grounds that in order to make ALD-52, they would have had to be in possession of LSD, which was illegal. The late 1960s also saw the introduction of various analogues of phencyclidine (PCP) to the illicit market, with Eticyclidine (PCE) first being detected in 1969.

==== 1980s–early 1990s ====
The modern use of the term designer drug was coined in the 1980s to refer to various synthetic opioid drugs, based mostly on the fentanyl molecule (such as α-methylfentanyl). The term gained widespread popularity when MDMA (ecstasy) experienced a popularity boom in the mid-1980s. When the term was coined in the 1980s, a wide range of narcotics were being sold as heroin on the black market. Many were based on fentanyl or meperidine. One, MPPP, was found in some cases to contain an impurity called MPTP, which caused brain damage that could result in a syndrome identical to late stage Parkinson's disease, from only a single dose. Other problems were highly potent fentanyl analogues that caused many accidental overdoses.

Because the government was powerless to prosecute people for these drugs until after they had been marketed successfully, laws were passed to give the DEA power to emergency schedule chemicals for a year, with an optional 6-month extension, while gathering evidence to justify permanent scheduling, as well as the analogue laws mentioned previously. Emergency-scheduling power was used for the first time for MDMA. In this case, the DEA scheduled MDMA as a Schedule I drug and retained this classification after review, even though their own judge ruled that MDMA should be classified Schedule III on the basis of its demonstrated uses in medicine. The emergency scheduling power has subsequently been used for a variety of other drugs including 2C-B, AMT, and BZP. In 2004, a piperazine drug, TFMPP, became the first drug that had been emergency-scheduled to be denied permanent scheduling and revert to legal status.

The late 1980s and early 1990s also saw the re-emergence of methamphetamine in the United States as a widespread public health issue, leading to increasing controls on precursor chemicals in an attempt to cut down on domestic manufacture of the drug. This led to several alternative stimulant drugs emerging, the most notable ones being methcathinone and 4-methylaminorex, but, despite attracting enough attention from authorities to provoke legal scheduling of these compounds, their distribution was relatively limited in extent and methamphetamine continued to dominate the illicit synthetic stimulant market overall.

The Temple of the True Inner Light, a small psychedelic church based in New York City which believes that psychedelic drugs are the physical form of God, was founded in 1980 and has operated for decades since then. It has employed the legal designer psychedelic dipropyltryptamine (DPT) as its sacrament since its formation and has been unbothered by authorities like the Drug Enforcement Administration (DEA).

==== Late 1990s–2004 ====
In the late 1990s and early 2000s, there was a huge explosion in designer drugs being sold over the internet. The term and concept of "research chemicals" was coined by some marketers of designer drugs (in particular, of psychedelic drugs in the tryptamine and phenethylamine family). The idea was that, by selling the chemicals as for "scientific research" rather than human consumption, the intent clause of the U.S. analogue drug laws would be avoided. Nonetheless, the DEA raided multiple suppliers, first JLF Primary Materials, and then multiple vendors (such as RAC Research) several years later in Operation Web Tryp. This process was accelerated greatly when vendors began advertising via search engines like Google by linking their sites to searches on key words such as chemical names and terms like psychedelic or hallucinogen. Widespread discussion of consumptive use and the sources for the chemicals in public forums also drew the attention of the media and authorities.

In 2004, the US Drug Enforcement Administration raided and shut down several Internet-based research chemical vendors in an operation called Web Tryp. With help from the authorities in India and China, two chemical manufacturers were also closed. Many other internet-based vendors promptly stopped doing business, even though their products were still legal throughout much of the world.

Most substances that were sold as "research chemicals" in this period of time are hallucinogens and bear a chemical resemblance to drugs such as psilocybin and mescaline. As with other hallucinogens, these substances are often taken for the purposes of facilitating spiritual processes, mental reflection or recreation. Some research chemicals on the market were not psychoactive, but can be used as precursors in the synthesis of other potentially psychoactive substances, for example, 2C-H, which could be used to make 2C-B and 2C-I among others. Extensive surveys of structural variations have been conducted by pharmaceutical corporations, universities and independent researchers over the last century, from which some of the presently available research chemicals derive. One particularly notable researcher is Alexander Shulgin, who presented syntheses and pharmacological explorations of hundreds of substances in the books TiHKAL and PiHKAL (co-authored with Ann Shulgin), and served as an expert witness for the defense in several court cases against manufacturers of psychoactive drugs.

The majority of chemical suppliers sold research chemicals in bulk form as powder, not as pills, as selling in pill form would invalidate the claims that they were being sold for non-consumptive research. Active dosages vary widely from substance to substance, ranging from micrograms to hundreds of milligrams, but while it is critical for the end user to weigh doses with a precision scale, instead of guessing ("eyeballing"), many users did not do this and this led to many emergency room visits and several deaths, which were a prominent factor leading to the emergency scheduling of several substances and eventually Operation Web Tryp. Some compounds such as 2C-B and 5-Meo-DiPT did eventually increase in popularity to the point that they were sold in pill form to reach a wider market, and acquired popular street names ("Nexus" and "Foxy," respectively). Once a chemical reaches this kind of popularity, it is usually just a matter of time before it is added to the list of scheduled (i.e., illegal) drugs.

The late 1990s and early 2000s also saw the first widespread use of novel anabolic steroids by athletes in competition. Steroids had been banned by the International Olympic Committee since 1976, but due to the large number of different anabolic agents available for human and veterinary use, the ability of laboratories to test for all available drugs had always lagged behind the ability of athletes to find new compounds to use. The introduction of increasingly formalised testing procedures, especially with the creation of the World Anti-Doping Agency in 1999, made it much more difficult for athletes to get away with using these drugs without detection, which then led to the synthesis of novel and potent anabolic steroid drugs such as tetrahydrogestrinone (THG), which were not detectable by the standard tests.

==== 2005–2021 ====
While through recent history most designer drugs had been either opioids, hallucinogens, or anabolic steroids, the range of possible compounds is limited only by the scientific and patent literature, and recent years have been characterised by a broadening of the range of compounds sold as designer drugs. These have included a wide variety of designer stimulants such as geranamine, mephedrone, MDPV and desoxypipradrol, several designer sedatives such as methylmethaqualone and premazepam, and designer analogues of sildenafil (Viagra), which have been reported as active compounds in "herbal" aphrodisiac products. Designer cannabinoids are another recent development, with two compounds JWH-018 and (C8)-CP 47,497 initially found in December 2008 as active components of "herbal smoking blends" sold as legal alternatives to marijuana. Subsequently, a growing range of synthetic cannabinoid agonists have continued to appear, including by 2010, novel compounds such as RCS-4, RCS-8, and AB-001, which had never been reported in the literature, and appear to have been invented by designer drug manufacturers themselves. Another novel development is the use of research ligands for cosmetic rather than strictly recreational purposes, such as grey-market internet sales of the non-approved alpha-melanocyte-stimulating hormone tanning drugs known as melanotan peptides.

"...what is new is the wide range of substances now being explored, the aggressive marketing of products that have been intentionally mislabelled, the growing use of the internet, and the speed at which the market reacts to control measures."

— EMCDDA director Wolfgang Goetz (November 2009).

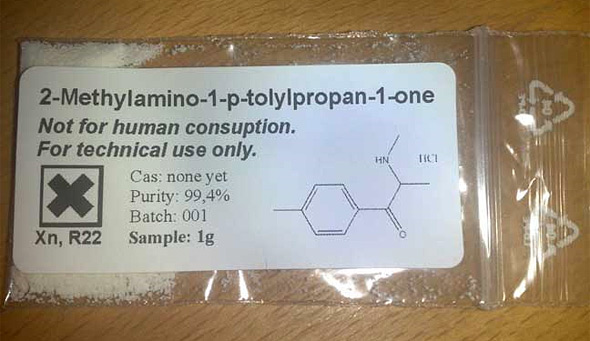
A sample of mephedrone. Note the label: "Not for human consumption. For technical use only"

Mephedrone and the cathinones marked somewhat of a turning point for designer drugs, turning them from little known, ineffective substances sold in head shops to powerful substances able to compete with classical drugs on the black market. Mephedrone especially experienced a somewhat meteoric rise in popularity in 2009 and the resulting media panic resulted in its prohibition in multiple countries. Following this there was a considerable emergence of other cathinones which attempted to mimic the effects of mephedrone, and with a newly attracted customer base, plenty of money to drive innovation.

Subsequently, the market rapidly expanded, with more and more substances being detected every year. In 2009, the EMCDDA's early warning system discovered 24 new drugs. In 2010, it found another 41; in 2011, another 49; and in 2012, there were 73 more. In 2013, a further 81 were identified: a total of 268 new drugs in just four years. These have not been limited to cathinones, with 35% being cannabinoids and the rest being composed of stimulants, benzodiazepines, psychedelics, dissociatives and to a lesser extent, every other class of drugs, even ibogoids and nootropics. The largest group of drugs being monitored by the EMCDDA is synthetic cannabinoids, with 209 different synthetic cannabinoids reported between 2008 and 2021 - including 11 new cannabinoids identified for the first time in 2020.

Since 2019, highly potent nitazenes (benzimidazole opioids) have proliferated as "new synthetic opioids" in the North American and European narcotics markets and as such have become a formative component of the opioid epidemic in the United States. Overdoses of nitazene opioids have led to several hundred documented fatalities.

==== 2022–present ====
In the early-to-mid 2020s, designer psychedelics such as 4-AcO-DMT (psilacetin) (found in mushroom edibles) and 4-HO-MET (metocin) and designer entactogens such as 5-MAPB have emerged and/or surged as openly marketed recreational drugs in the United States.

In the early 2020s, safety and legal difficulty of regulating peptides spurred the growth of grey-market synthetic peptide hormone vendors. These peptides are marketed as non-recreational and sold for their purported anti-aging, performance enhancing and cosmetic benefits. Such vendors may employ medical professionals using legal ambiguity for their operations.

== Terminology ==
Many terms exist other than "designer drug" often depending on the context and geographical region. For example, the term new psychoactive substance (NPS) is more commonly used in academic settings, and in regions such as Australia, New Zealand, and European Union, including United Kingdom (UK).

=== Common names ===
In the UK, to avoid being controlled by the Medicines Act, designer drugs such as mephedrone have been described as "plant food", despite the compounds having no history of being used for these purposes.

In the US, similar descriptions ("bath salts" is the most common) have been used to describe mephedrone as well as methylone and methylenedioxypyrovalerone (MDPV). Combined with labeling that they are "not for human consumption," these descriptions are an attempt to skirt the Federal Analog Act which forbids drugs that are "substantially similar" to already classified drugs from being sold for human use.

Synthetic cannabinoids are known under a variety of names including K2, Spice, Black Mamba, Bombay Blue, Genie, Zohai, Banana Cream Nuke, Krypton, and Lava Red. They are often called "synthetic marijuana," "herbal incense," or "herbal smoking blends" and often labeled "not for human consumption."

== Safety ==
The safety of research chemicals is untested and little if any research has been done on the toxicology or pharmacology of most of these drugs. Few, if any, human or animal studies have been done. Many research compounds have produced unexpected side-effects and adverse incidents due to the lack of screening for off-target effects prior to marketing; both Bromo-DragonFLY and mephedrone seem to be capable of producing pronounced vasoconstriction under some circumstances, which has resulted in several deaths, although the mechanism remains unclear. Substituted phenethylamines such as the 2C family and substituted amphetamines such as the DOx family have also caused a limited number of deaths.

== Law ==
Due to the recent development of many designer drugs, laws banning or regulating their use have not been developed yet, and in recent cases novel drugs have appeared directly in response to legislative action, to replace a similar compound that had recently been banned. Many of the chemicals fall under the various drug analogue legislations in certain countries, but most countries have no general analogue act or equivalent legislation and so novel compounds may fall outside of the law after only minor structural modifications.

In the United States, the Controlled Substances Act was amended by the Controlled Substance Analogue Enforcement of 1986, which attempted to ban designer drugs pre-emptively by making it illegal to manufacture, sell, or possess chemicals that were substantially similar in chemistry and pharmacology to Schedule I or Schedule II drugs.

Other countries have dealt with the issue differently. In some, the new drugs are banned as they become a concern, as in Germany, Canada, the United Kingdom, and Sweden. In Sweden, the police and customs may also seize drugs that are not on the list of drugs covered by the anti-drug laws if the police suspect that the purpose of the holding is related to drug abuse. Following a decision by a prosecutor, the police may destroy the seized drugs.

In Ireland, the Criminal Justice (Psychoactive Substances) Act 2010 bans substances based on their psychoactive effect, and was introduced as a catch-all to address the time lag between new substances appearing and their being banned individually. In the United Kingdom, the Psychoactive Substances Act 2016 adopts a similar approach.

Some countries, such as Australia, have enacted generic bans but based on chemical structure rather than psychoactive effect: if a chemical fits a set of rules regarding substitutions and alterations of an already-banned drug, then it too is banned. Brazil adopted the same model as Australia, in a recent ruling from ANVISA, which is responsible for defining what constitute drugs.

=== Temporary class drug ===
A temporary class drug is a relatively new status for controlled drugs, which has been adopted in some jurisdictions, notably New Zealand and the United Kingdom, to attempt to bring newly synthesized designer drugs under legal control. The controlled drug legislation in these jurisdictions requires drug scheduling decisions to follow an evidence-based process, where the harms of the drug are assessed and reviewed so that an appropriate legal status can be assigned. Since many designer drugs sold in recent years have had little or no published research that could help inform such a decision, they have been widely sold as "legal highs," often for months, before sufficient evidence accumulates to justify placing them on the controlled drug schedules.

== See also ==
- Controlled Substances Act
- Controlled Substance Analogue Enforcement of 1986
- Controlled Drugs and Substances Act
- Lizard Labs
- New chemical entity
- Online illicit drug vendor
- Operation Web Tryp
- Federal Analogue Act
- Pharmaceutical company
- Psychoactive Substances Act 2013 – New Zealand
- Psychoactive Substances Act 2016 – UK ban on all drugs based on psychoactive effect
- PsychonautWiki
- Research chemical
