= LSZ =

Psychedelic drug

- Structure of LA-SS-Az (trans-(S,S)-LSZ), the most active and commonly used isomer of LSZ

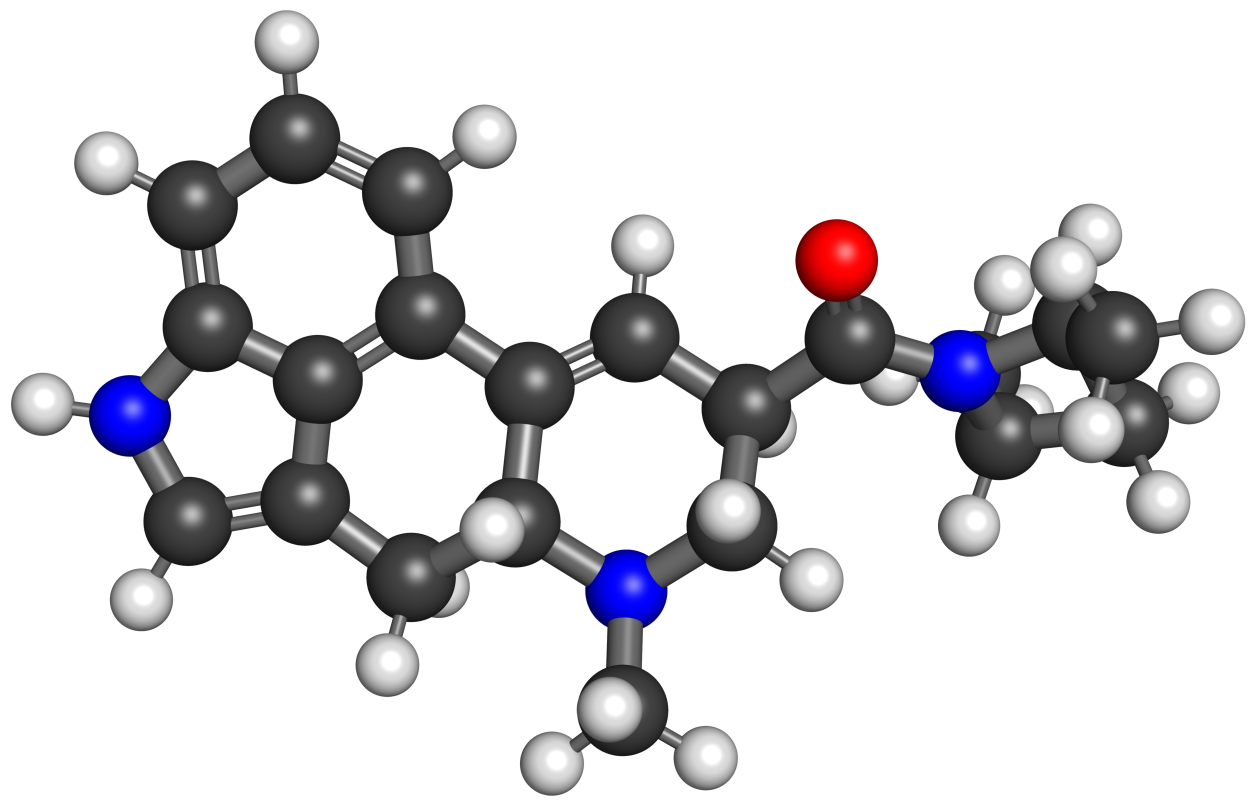
- Ball-and-stick model of LSZ

Clinical data
- Other names: Lysergic acid 2,4-dimethylazetidine; Lysergic acid 2S,4S-dimethylazetidine; LSZ; LA-Azetidide; LSD-Azetidide; LA-SS-Az; SS-LSZ; (S,S)-LSZ; Diazedine; λ; Lambda
- Routes of administration: Oral
- Drug class: Non-selective serotonin receptor agonist; Serotonin 5-HT_{2A} receptor agonist; Serotonergic psychedelic; Hallucinogen

Legal status
- Legal status: DE: NpSG (Industrial and scientific use only); UK: Class A; Illegal in Denmark, France, Sweden, and Switzerland

Pharmacokinetic data
- Duration of action: 3–11 hours (median 8 hours)

Identifiers
- IUPAC name: [(6aR,9R)-7-methyl-6,6a,8,9-tetrahydro-4H-indolo[4,3-fg]quinoline-9-yl]-[(2S,4S)-2,4-dimethylazetidin-1-yl]methanone
- freebase: (S,S)-isomer, freebase; tartrate salt: (S,S)-isomer, tartrate salt
- CAS Number: freebase: 470666-31-0; tartrate salt: 470666-32-1
- PubChem CID: freebase: 71301249
- DrugBank: freebase: DB15196
- ChemSpider: freebase: 30773535
- UNII: freebase: 8SWJ525W4R
- CompTox Dashboard (EPA): freebase: DTXSID201026958

Chemical and physical data
- Formula: C_{21}H_{25}N_{3}O
- Molar mass: 335.451 g·mol^{−1}
- 3D model (JSmol): freebase: Interactive image
- SMILES: freebase: C[C@H]1C[C@@H](N1C(=O)[C@H]2CN([C@@H]3CC4=CNC5=CC=CC(=C45)C3=C2)C)C
- InChI: freebase: InChI=1S/C21H25N3O/c1-12-7-13(2)24(12)21(25)15-8-17-16-5-4-6-18-20(16)14(10-22-18)9-19(17)23(3)11-15/h4-6,8,10,12-13,15,19,22H,7,9,11H2,1-3H3/t12-,13-,15+,19+/m0/s1; Key:DUKNIHFTDAXJON-CTQRGLTFSA-N

LSZ, also known as lysergic acid 2,4-dimethylazetidide or as LA-Azetidide (LA-Az), is a psychedelic drug of the lysergamide family related to lysergic acid diethylamide (LSD). It is taken orally.

The drug acts as a non-selective serotonin receptor agonist, including of the serotonin 5-HT_{2A} receptor. It also interacts with dopamine receptors. The compound is a close analogue of LSD that has been modified at the amide to be more rigid and to have three diastereomers. LA-SS-Az, the (S,S)- isomer, is the most potent and similar isomer to LSD, and is the typically employed form of LSZ. LA-SS-Az and the other isomers of LSZ produce psychedelic-like effects in animals.

LSZ was first described in the scientific literature by David E. Nichols and colleagues in 2002. It was developed as a tool for studying psychedelic interactions with the serotonin 5-HT_{2A} receptor and followed the earlier unstable compound LA-Aziridine developed by Nichols and Robert Oberlender. LSZ, under the name "diazedine", may have been produced on a small scale by the LSD manufacturers William Leonard Pickard and Gordon Todd Skinner around the year 2000. It was first definitely encountered as a novel designer drug in 2013 and then became a popular psychedelic. LSZ is a controlled substance in several European countries.

== Use and effects ==
LSZ, as the (S,S)- isomer LA-SS-Az, has been reported to have a dose range of 100 to 200 μg or 100 to 300 μg orally, with a typical dose estimate of 150 or 200 μg. This dose range is notably higher than that of LSD, which is 50 to 200 μg with a typical dose of about 100 μg. According to David E. Nichols however, LSZ is approximately equipotent with LSD based on human anecdotal reports. The duration of LSZ is reported to be in the range of 3 to 11 hours, with a median duration of around 8 hours. This was shorter than the duration of the LSD prodrug 1P-LSD, which had a duration range of 6 to 14 hours and a median duration of about 10 hours in the same study. The detailed effects of LSZ, aside from it being a psychedelic similarly to LSD, do not appear to have been reported in the published literature.

== Pharmacology ==
=== Pharmacodynamics ===
LSZ activities
Target	Affinity (K_{i}, nM)
5-HT_{1A}	0.45
5-HT_{1B}	2.4
5-HT_{1D}	2.4
5-HT_{1E}	276
5-HT_{1F}	ND
5-HT_{2A}	0.54–19.2 (K_{i}); 0.32–957 (EC_{50}); 56–85% (E_{max})
5-HT_{2B}	27 (K_{i}); 0.4–58.4 (EC_{50}); 57–74% (E_{max})
5-HT_{2C}	37 (K_{i}); 992 (EC_{50}); 39% (E_{max})
5-HT_{3}	>10,000
5-HT_{4}	ND
5-HT_{5A}	27.3
5-HT_{6}	14.5
5-HT_{7}	14.3
α_{1A}	850.2
α_{1B}	>10,000
α_{1D}–α_{2C}	ND
β_{1}	75.8
β_{2}	1,069
β_{3}	ND
D_{1}	292
D_{2}	73.6–110
D_{3}	6.0
D_{4}	36–95.5
D_{5}	402.2
H_{1}	2,504
H_{2}–H_{4}	ND
M_{1}–M_{5}	ND
I_{1}	ND
σ_{1}, σ_{2}	ND
TAAR1	ND
SERT	>10,000 (K_{i})
NET	>10,000 (K_{i})
DAT	>10,000 (K_{i})
Notes: The smaller the value, the more avidly the drug binds to the site. All proteins are human unless otherwise specified. Refs:

LSZ has been found to bind non-selectively to serotonin, dopamine, and certain other receptors. It shows especially high affinity for the serotonin 5-HT_{1A}, 5-HT_{2A}, and 5-HT_{2C} receptors, among others. The drug acts as a potent agonist of the serotonin 5-HT_{2A} and 5-HT_{2C} receptors, with potency and efficacy similar to that of LSD. It may be more potent than LSD as an agonist of the serotonin 5-HT_{1A} receptor.

LSZ produces the head-twitch response, a behavioral proxy of psychedelic-like effects, in rodents. It shows about the same potency as LSD and AL-LAD in producing this effect. However, LSZ shows a weaker maximal head-twitch response than LSD or AL-LAD. This might be due to lower efficacy at the serotonin 5-HT_{2A} receptor or stronger actions at other receptors like the serotonin 5-HT_{1A} or 5-HT_{2C} receptor. LSZ also substitutes for LSD in rodent drug discrimination tests. It was about 1.8-fold more potent than LSD in this assay. All three isomers of LSZ fully substituted for LSD in rodent drug discrimination tests, but the (S,S)- isomer was the most potent and was the only isomer that was more potent than LSD. In addition, only the (S,S) isomer fully substituted for the LSD-like selective serotonin 5-HT_{1A} receptor full agonist and partial ergoline LY-293284. In contrast to LSZ, LSD itself does not substitute for LY-293284 in drug discrimination tests.

In addition to its psychedelic effects, LSZ has been found to produce anti-inflammatory effects in preclinical research.

=== Pharmacokinetics ===
The in-vitro metabolism of LSZ has been studied.

== Chemistry ==
LSZ, also known as lysergic acid 2,4-dimethylazetidide or as LA-Azetidine (LA-Az), is a substituted lysergamide derivative related to lysergic acid diethylamide (LSD). It is the analogue of LSD in which the N,N-diethylamide moiety has been replaced with an 2,4-dimethylazetidine moiety. The compound has three possible diastereomers around the azetidine ring, including the cis-(2RS,4SR)-, trans-(2R,4R)-, and trans-(2S,4S)- 2,4-dimethylazetidine isomers. The (S,S)- isomer, also known as LA-SS-Az, is the most potent diastereomer and is the typically employed form of the compound.

LSZ and its three diastereomers
LSZ

cis-LSZ

trans-(R,R)-LSZ

trans-(S,S)-LSZ
(LA-SS-Az)

=== Synthesis ===
The chemical synthesis of LSZ has been described.

=== Analogues ===
Analogues of LSZ include other lysergamides like the 6-substituted lysergamides ETH-LAD, PRO-LAD, AL-LAD, and CE-LAD; the amide-substituted lysergamides LA-3Cl-SB, EcPLA, and MiPLA; the amide-cycilzed lysergamides LA-Aziridine, LA-Pyr (LPD-824), LPN, LA-Pip, LA-Morph (LSM-775), and LA-Azepane; and the ester prodrugs ALD-52 (1A-LSD), 1P-LSD, 1cP-LSD, 1V-LSD, 1B-LSD, 1P-ETH-LAD, and 1cP-AL-LAD, among others.

== History ==
LSZ was developed by David E. Nichols and colleagues at Purdue University and was first described by them in the scientific literature in 2002. It was developed to help better understand the binding orientation of LSD at the serotonin 5-HT_{2A} receptor and to help further map the topography of the receptor. LSZ is a rigid analogue of LSD in which the N,N-diethylamide moiety has been replaced with and constrained into a 2,4-dimethylazetidine moiety. Moreover, the compound has two additional chiral centers due to this modification, with three possible diastereomers.

Nichols and colleagues like Robert Oberlender had initially attempted to do this research by employing the closely related and very similar compound LA-Aziridine in the 1980s, but this drug proved to be highly chemically unstable such that in-vivo studies were precluded. With the development of LSZ, the team determined that the (S,S)- isomer, LA-SS-Az, was the most potent and hence most optimal configuration of LSZ in terms of serotonin 5-HT_{2A} receptor activation and psychedelic-like effects in animals. In addition, the conformation of LSD within the crystal structure of the closely related serotonin 5-HT_{2B} receptor was later found to be essentially superimposable with the structure of LA-SS-Az. Similar findings were made with virtual docking studies with the serotonin 5-HT_{2A} receptor. LSZ, as LA-SS-Az, is among the only known analogues of LSD modified at the amide to have similar or greater psychedelic-type potency.

According to Krystle Cole in an interview with journalist and researcher Hamilton Morris, the LSD clandestine manufacturers William Leonard Pickard and Gordon Todd Skinner had synthesized and experimented with a psychedelic drug they called "diazedine" around the year 2000. Per Cole, "[diazedine] was also crazy, but nothing earth-shattering". Pickard and Skinner had high expectations for the drug and intended to produce and distribute it as an LSD alternative, but had difficulty scaling its synthesis due to high production costs and low yields. Pickard was a student of Nichols in his lab at Purdue University and was aware of the work on LSZ before it was published. Morris has speculated that "diazedine" (notably a contraction of "dimethylazetidine") is extremely likely to have been LSZ, although this remains unconfirmed. There have also been rumors for many years that LSZ was distributed for a time on blotter paper under the name "λ" ("lambda"), though this has likewise not been confirmed.

LSZ was first definitely encountered as a novel designer drug, in Europe, in December 2013. It is known to have been produced and sold by the now-defunct psychedelic lysergamide manufacturer Lizard Labs in the 2010s and 2020s. The drug is said to have become a popular psychedelic drug and alternative to other lysergamides like LSD following its initial emergence.

== Society and culture ==
=== Legal status ===
==== Canada ====
LSZ is not a controlled substance in Canada as of 2025.

==== Europe ====
LSZ is illegal in Switzerland as of December 2015, in Denmark as of May 2015, and in Sweden as of January 2016. It is also illegal in France.

==== United Kingdom ====
On June 10, 2014, the United Kingdom Advisory Council on the Misuse of Drugs (ACMD) recommended that LSZ be specifically named in the UK Misuse of Drugs Act as a class A drug despite not identifying any harm associated with its use. The United Kingdom Home office accepted this advice and announced a ban of the substance to be enacted on 6 January 2015 as part of the Misuse of Drugs Act amended in 2014.

==== United States ====
LSZ is not an explicitly controlled substance in the United States. However, it could be considered a controlled substance under the Federal Analogue Act if intended for human consumption.

== Research ==
LSZ has been patented as a potential anti-inflammatory drug by Charles D. Nichols and colleagues.

== See also ==
- Substituted lysergamide
- Lizard Labs
