= 1F-LSD =

Clinical data
- Other names: 1-(2-Furoyl)-LSD; 1-(Furan-2-carbonyl)-LSD; SYN-L-005; N,N-Diethyl-1-(furan-2-carbonyl)-6-methyl-9,10-didehydroergoline-8β-carboxamide
- Routes of administration: Oral
- Drug class: Serotonin receptor agonist; Serotonin 5-HT_{2A} receptor agonist; Serotonergic psychedelic; Hallucinogen
- ATC code: None

Identifiers
- IUPAC name: (6aR,9R)-N,N-diethyl-4-(furan-2-carbonyl)-7-methyl-6,6a,8,9-tetrahydroindolo[4,3-fg]quinoline-9-carboxamide
- PubChem CID: 170763729

Chemical and physical data
- Formula: C_{25}H_{27}N_{3}O_{3}
- Molar mass: 417.509 g·mol^{−1}
- 3D model (JSmol): Interactive image
- SMILES: CCN(CC)C(=O)[C@H]1CN([C@@H]2CC3=CN(C4=CC=CC(=C34)C2=C1)C(=O)C5=CC=CO5)C
- InChI: InChI=1S/C25H27N3O3/c1-4-27(5-2)24(29)17-12-19-18-8-6-9-20-23(18)16(13-21(19)26(3)14-17)15-28(20)25(30)22-10-7-11-31-22/h6-12,15,17,21H,4-5,13-14H2,1-3H3/t17-,21-/m1/s1; Key:VHDXVHVDSPZVCI-DYESRHJHSA-N

1F-LSD, also known as 1-(2-furoyl)-LSD or as SYN-L-005, is a psychedelic drug of the lysergamide family related to lysergic acid diethylamide (LSD). It is thought to act as a prodrug of LSD. The drug interacts with serotonin receptors, including the serotonin 5-HT_{2A} receptor, and produces the head-twitch response in rodents, with about 3-fold lower potency than LSD. It hydrolyzes into LSD in rodents. 1F-LSD was patented in 2024 and was first described in the scientific literature in 2025. It has been encountered as a novel designer drug in Germany and Japan.

== Chemistry ==
=== Analogues ===
Analogues of 1F-LSD include 1P-LSD, 1cP-LSD, 1B-LSD, 1S-LSD, and 1T-LSD, among others.

== Society and culture ==
=== Legal status ===
==== Canada ====
1F-LSD is not an explicitly nor implicitly controlled substance in Canada as of 2025.

==== United States ====
1F-LSD is not an explicitly controlled substance in the United States. However, it could be considered a controlled substance under the Federal Analogue Act if intended for human consumption.

== See also ==
- Substituted lysergamide
- Lizard Labs
