= 1T-AL-LAD =

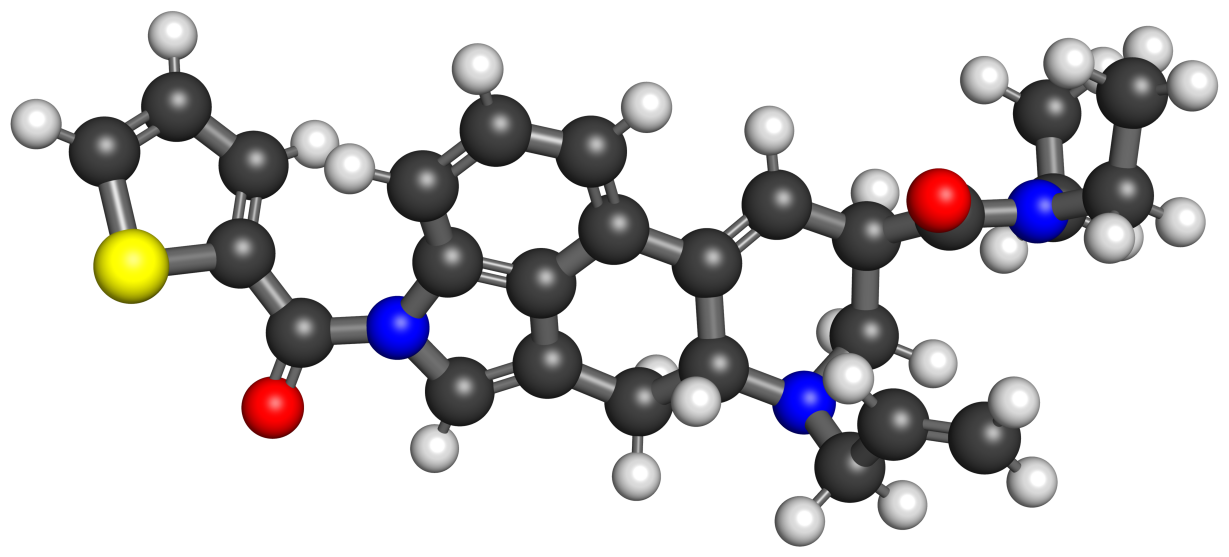

Clinical data
- Other names: 1-(Thiophene-2-carbonyl)-AL-LAD
- Routes of administration: Oral
- Drug class: Serotonergic psychedelic; Hallucinogen

Identifiers
- IUPAC name: (6aR,9R)-4-(thiophen-2-ylcarbonyl)-N,N-diethyl-7-prop-2-enyl-6,6a,8,9-tetrahydroindolo[4,3-fg]quinoline-9-carboxamide

Chemical and physical data
- Formula: C_{27}H_{29}N_{3}O_{2}S
- Molar mass: 459.61 g·mol^{−1}
- 3D model (JSmol): Interactive image
- SMILES: O=C(n1cc2C[C@H]3N(C[C@@H](C=C3c3cccc1c32)C(=O)N(CC)CC)CC=C)c1sccc1
- InChI: InChI=1S/C27H29N3O2S/c1-4-12-29-16-19(26(31)28(5-2)6-3)14-21-20-9-7-10-22-25(20)18(15-23(21)29)17-30(22)27(32)24-11-8-13-33-24/h4,7-11,13-14,17,19,23H,1,5-6,12,15-16H2,2-3H3/t19-,23-/m1/s1; Key:BMJBFHKDQQECIJ-AUSIDOKSSA-N

1T-AL-LAD, also known as 1-(thiophene-2-carbonyl)-AL-LAD, is a psychedelic lysergamide derivative which has been sold as a designer drug, first reported in April 2024. It is believed to act as a prodrug for AL-LAD in a similar manner to how 1P-LSD acts as a prodrug for LSD.

== Chemistry ==
=== Analogues ===
Analogues of 1T-AL-LAD include AL-LAD, 1P-AL-LAD, 1cP-AL-LAD, 1T-LSD, 1S-LSD, and 1P-ETH-LAD, among others.

== Society and culture ==
=== Legal status ===
==== Canada ====
1T-AL-LAD is not an explicitly nor implicitly controlled substance in Canada as of 2025.

==== United States ====
1T-AL-LAD is not an explicitly controlled substance in the United States. However, it could be considered a controlled substance under the Federal Analogue Act if intended for human consumption.

== See also ==
- Substituted lysergamide
- Lizard Labs
