= ALD-52 =

Chemical compound

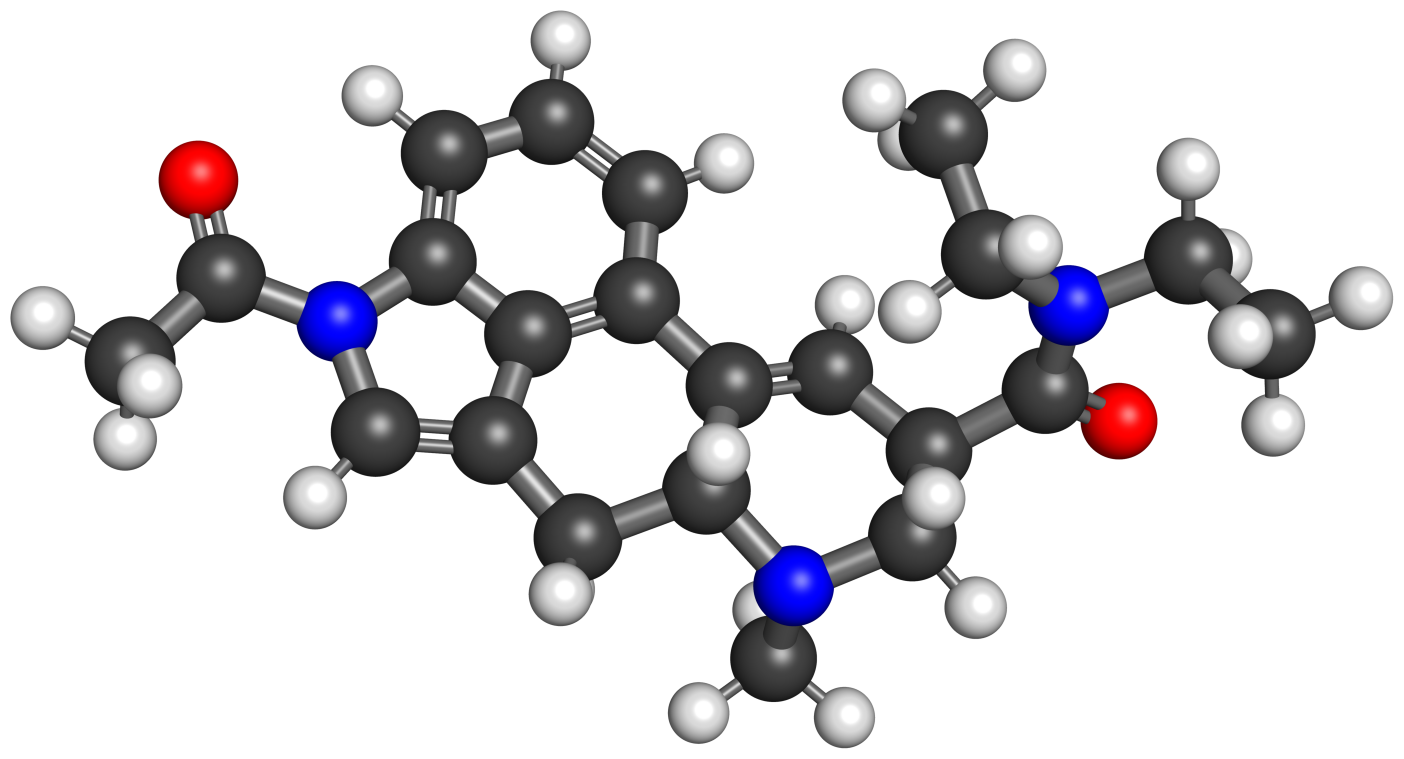

Clinical data
- Other names: ALD52; ALD; 1-Acetyl-N,N-diethyllysergamide; 1-Acetyl-LSD; 1A-LSD; N-Acetyl-LSD; N^{6}-Acetyl-LSD; Acetyl-LSD; Orange Sunshine; Orange Sunshine Acid
- Routes of administration: Oral
- Drug class: Serotonin receptor agonist; Serotonin 5-HT_{2A} receptor agonist; Serotonergic psychedelic; Hallucinogen

Legal status
- Legal status: AU: Unscheduled; BR: Class F2 (Prohibited psychotropics); CA: Unscheduled; DE: NpSG (Industrial and scientific use only); UK: Class A; US: Unscheduled, could be prosecuted under the Federal Analogue Act.; Unscheduled in the most countries of the world, Illegal in France, Romania, Switzerland, Finland and Singapore

Pharmacokinetic data
- Metabolism: Deacetylation (CYP3A4)
- Metabolites: LSD, others
- Onset of action: Similar to LSD
- Duration of action: Similar to LSD

Identifiers
- IUPAC name: (6aR,9R)-4-Acetyl-N,N-diethyl-7-methyl-4,6,6a,7,8,9-hexahydroindolo[4,3-fg]quinoline-9-carboxamide
- CAS Number: 3270-02-8
- PubChem CID: 201111
- ChemSpider: 174121
- UNII: R224WJZ8M7
- CompTox Dashboard (EPA): DTXSID20186370

Chemical and physical data
- Formula: C_{22}H_{27}N_{3}O_{2}
- Molar mass: 365.477 g·mol^{−1}
- 3D model (JSmol): Interactive image
- SMILES: O=C(n1cc2c3c(C4=C[C@@H](C(=O)N(CC)CC)CN([C@@H]4C2)C)cccc13)C
- InChI: InChI=1S/C22H27N3O2/c1-5-24(6-2)22(27)16-10-18-17-8-7-9-19-21(17)15(13-25(19)14(3)26)11-20(18)23(4)12-16/h7-10,13,16,20H,5-6,11-12H2,1-4H3/t16-,20-/m1/s1; Key:FJOWXGYLIWJFCH-OXQOHEQNSA-N

ALD-52, also known as 1-acetyl-LSD (1A-LSD) and falsely as "Orange Sunshine", is a psychedelic drug of the lysergamide family related to lysergic acid diethylamide (LSD). It is taken orally.

The drug acts as a readily converted prodrug of LSD and hence has very similar properties to those of LSD, including in terms of onset, duration, and subjective psychedelic effects. LSD itself acts as a non-selective agonist of serotonin and dopamine receptors, including of the serotonin 5-HT_{2A} receptor, and this mediates its hallucinogenic effects. ALD-52 is a 1-acyllysergamide, specifically the 1-acetyl derivative of LSD, and is closely related to other 1-acyllysergamide LSD prodrugs, such as 1P-LSD, 1V-LSD, and 1cP-LSD. The drug has about 90 to 100% of the potency of LSD.

ALD-52 was first described in the literature by Albert Hofmann and colleagues at Sandoz in 1957. It was once claimed that the "Orange Sunshine" LSD distributed by Tim Scully and Nick Sand during the 1967 Summer of Love in the United States was actually ALD-52 rather than LSD, but this turned out to be untrue. ALD-52 was first definitely encountered as a novel designer drug in 2016. The drug is a key parent compound and inspiration for the 1-acyllysergamide prodrugs like 1P-LSD that were developed by Lizard Labs and emerged as designer drugs in the mid-2010s.

== Use and effects ==
ALD-52 was long thought to be a readily converted prodrug of LSD. However, this was not empirically confirmed until formal studies were finally done in the 2010s and 2020s.

ALD-52 was clinically studied and found to produce psychedelic effects similar to those of LSD itself and to closely match the time–course of LSD in terms of onset and duration. However, in one study, it was claimed that ALD-52 seemed to modify cognition and body image to a greater extent than LSD. Both LSD and ALD-52 were reported to be active at doses of 0.5 to 1 μg/kg orally (35–70 μg for a 70-kg person). Other sources found that ALD-52 was 91% as potent as LSD (with LSD notably having 88% of the molecular weight of ALD-52) or that the two drugs were equipotent.

In his book TiHKAL (Tryptamines I Have Known and Loved), Alexander Shulgin briefly discusses ALD-52, giving a dose range of 50 to 175 μg orally and no onset or duration mentioned. In other publications however, he gave a dose range of 100 to 200 μg orally. A few different individual accounts of the effects of ALD-52 were described by Shulgin. One account found that there was less visual distortion than with LSD, that there was seemingly less anxiety than with LSD, and that it was somewhat less potent than LSD. Another claimed that it was more effective than LSD in increasing blood pressure. One account could not tell ALD-52 and LSD apart. Per Shulgin, if ALD-52 is a readily converted prodrug of LSD, then they should be equivalent in all regards (aside from a slight difference in potency).

== Pharmacology ==
=== Pharmacodynamics ===
ALD-52 is a readily converted prodrug of LSD and hence has similar pharmacology to LSD. This has been confirmed with human liver enzymes in vitro and in rodents in vivo, but still needs to be confirmed with a clinical study in humans in vivo.

In early studies, ALD-52 was found to have 19 or 20% of the toxicity of LSD in rabbits given intravenously, 12.5 or 13% of the pyretogenic effect of LSD in rabbits, and 2.0 to 2.1 times the antiserotonergic activity of LSD in the isolated rat uterus in vitro.

The receptor interactions of ALD-52 have been studied. The drug shows dramatically reduced affinities for the serotonin 5-HT_{1A} and 5-HT_{2A} receptors compared to LSD itself. It also showed markedly reduced activational potency and efficacy at the serotonin 5-HT_{2A} receptor relative to LSD, whereas agonistic activity at the serotonin 5-HT_{2B} and 5-HT_{2C} receptors was lost entirely.

An early study reported that ALD-52 surprisingly did not produce the head-twitch response, a behavioral proxy of psychedelic effects, in mice. It was subsequently suggested that this could be due to species differences in the metabolism of ALD-52. However, later research found that ALD-52 does indeed produce the head-twitch response in mice and that the earlier findings were erroneous. ALD-52 had about 45% of the molar potency of LSD in inducing the head-twitch response, whereas 1P-LSD had about 38%, 1V-LSD 36%, and 1cP-LSD 31% of the molar potency of LSD in this assay.

=== Pharmacokinetics ===
The preclinical pharmacokinetics and metabolism of ALD-52 have been studied. A large percentage of the total dose of both ALD-52 and 1P-LSD is metabolized into LSD in rodents. Circulating levels of LSD following subcutaneous injection in rodents are virtually identical with administration of ALD-52 and 1P-LSD. The formation of LSD from ALD-52 could be largely blocked by the strong cytochrome P450 inhibitor ketoconazole in a human liver enzyme system in vitro, with CYP3A4 specifically appearing to be responsible for ALD-52 deacetylation into LSD.

== Chemistry ==
ALD-52, also known as 1-acetyl-N,N-diethyllysergamide or as 1-acetyl-LSD (1A-LSD), is a substituted lysergamide and a 1-acyl derivative of lysergic acid diethylamide (LSD; N,N-diethyllysergamide), more specifically the 1-acetyl analogue of LSD.

=== Properties ===
The chemical stability of ALD-52 has been studied and described.

=== Synthesis ===
The chemical synthesis of ALD-52 has been described.

=== Analogues ===
Analogues of ALD-52 (1A-LSD) include MLD-41 (1-methyl-LSD), OML-632 (1-hydroxymethyl-LSD), ALA-10 (1A-LAE), 1-formyl-LSD, 1P-LSD, 1cP-LSD, 1V-LSD, 1B-LSD, 1S-LSD, 1T-LSD, 1P-ETH-LAD, and 1cP-AL-LAD, among others.

== History ==
ALD-52 was first synthesized and described in the scientific literature by Albert Hofmann and Franz Troxler at Sandoz in 1957. The properties and effects of ALD-52 were studied and reported in the late 1950s and early 1960s. It is said to be unclear whether ALD-52 ever circulated as a recreational drug similarly to LSD in the 1960s or subsequent decades.

The LSD manufacturers Tim Scully and Nick Sand once claimed that the "Orange Sunshine" LSD they distributed during the 1967 Summer of Love in the United States was actually ALD-52 rather than LSD. More specifically, they had been apprehended by law enforcement in 1973 and the pair argued in court that same year that they had distributed ALD-52 rather than LSD. This was notable as ALD-52 was not a controlled substance and hence was not technically illegal in contrast to LSD. However, the prosecution argued that ALD-52 readily converts into LSD and that the synthesis of ALD-52 requires going through LSD as an intermediate. In addition, they tested a sample of supposed ALD-52 that Sand and Scully provided to them via a friend which inadvertently turned out to be LSD. The pair were found guilty, including of lying in court, and Scully was sentenced to 20 years in prison while Sand received 15 years in prison. Later, in the 2000s and 2010s, Sand and Scully publicly admitted that they had never in fact manufactured or distributed ALD-52 and that "Orange Sunshine" was LSD all along. They disclosed that they had unsuccessfully lied to the court in an attempt to exploit a legal loophole and avoid conviction and prison time, which they regretted. The subject of the "Orange Sunshine" LSD was covered in the 2015 documentary The Sunshine Makers by Cosmo Feilding Mellen.

ALD-52 was one of the earliest 1-acyllysergamides to be described. It is a key parent compound of the 1-acyllysergamide LSD prodrugs and served as inspiration for development of subsequent compounds of this series such as 1P-LSD, 1V-LSD, and 1cP-LSD, among many others. These LSD prodrugs were developed by Lizard Labs and emerged as novel designer drugs starting in the mid-2010s. ALD-52 itself was first definitely encountered as a novel designer drug in Europe in 2016. Soon thereafter, it was encountered in Japan and Brazil. The detection of 1P-LSD slightly preceded that of ALD-52, having been first encountered in 2015. ALD-52 was thought to act as a prodrug of LSD since at least the 1960s. However, this was not definitely confirmed until formal studies were done in the 2010s and 2020s.

== Society and culture ==
=== Legal status ===
==== Austria ====
ALD-52 is technically not illegal but it may fall in the NPSG (Neue-Psychoaktive-Substanzen-Gesetz Österreich) as an analogue of LSD.

==== Canada ====
ALD-52 is not a controlled substance in Canada as of 2025.

==== Denmark ====
ALD-52 is not listed as an illegal substance in Denmark as of April 2019, and its chemical class 'lysergamide' is not banned under the Analogue Act (some LSD analogues are, however, prohibited).

==== Finland ====
ALD-52 is labeled a controlled psychoactive substance in Finland as of 2014.

==== Germany ====
ALD-52 is controlled under the NpSG as of July 18, 2019. Production and import with the aim to place it on the market, administration to another person and trading is punishable. Possession is illegal but not penalized.

==== Latvia ====
ALD-52 is illegal in Latvia. Although it is not officially scheduled, it is controlled as an LSD structural analog due to an amendment made on June 1, 2015.

==== Romania ====
ALD-52 is illegal to produce or sell in Romania. It is not included directly in the list of controlled substances, but it is included in an analogue act. However, it is not, as of yet, classified as illegal to use.

==== Singapore ====
ALD-52 is a class A controlled drug, and is illegal to traffic, manufacture, import, export, possess, or consume in Singapore as of December 1, 2019, punishable with a minimum of five years' imprisonment and five strokes of the cane.

==== Switzerland ====
Since March 2018, ALD-52 is illegal in Switzerland and has been put in the RS 812.121.11.

==== United Kingdom ====
On June 10, 2014, the UK Advisory Council on the Misuse of Drugs (ACMD) recommended that ALD-52 be specifically named in the UK Misuse of Drugs Act as a class A drug despite not identifying it as ever having been sold or any harm associated with its use. The UK Home office accepted this advice and announced a ban of the substance to be enacted on 6 January 2015 as part of The Misuse of Drugs Act 1971 (Amendment) (No. 2) Order 2014.

==== United States ====
ALD-52 is unscheduled in the United States. It may be considered an analogue of LSD, a Schedule I substance under the Controlled Substances Act however. As such, the sale for human consumption or the use for illicit non-medical or scientific use could be prosecuted as crimes under the Federal Analogue Act, though is legal for other uses such as use in research settings.

== See also ==
- Substituted lysergamide
- Lizard Labs
- 1-Acetyl-5-MeO-DMT (1A-5-MeO-DMT)
