= 1cP-LSD =

Chemical compound

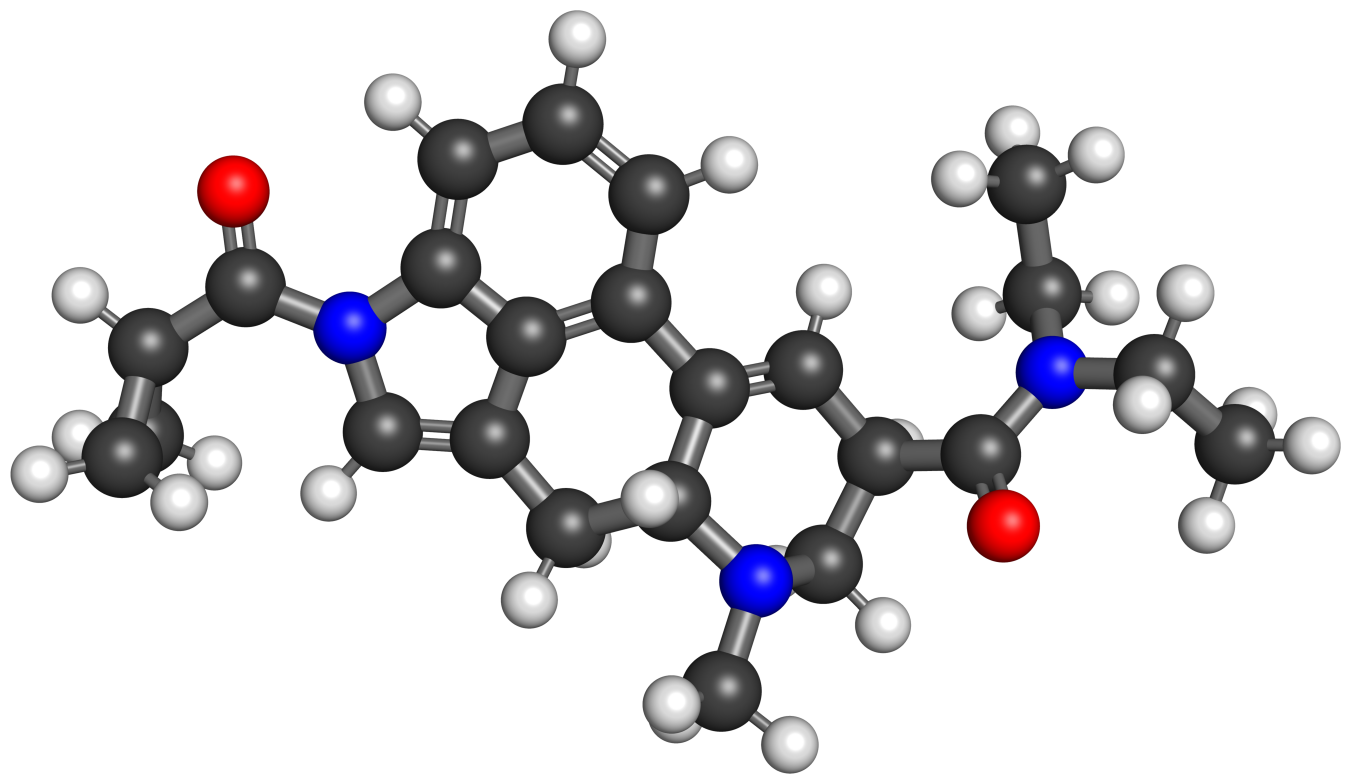

Clinical data
- Other names: 1-CPA-LSD; 1-Cyclopropanoyl-LSD; 1-Cyclopropionyl-LSD; 1-(Cyclopropylmethanoyl)-LSD; 1cP; Curie
- Routes of administration: Oral
- Drug class: Serotonergic psychedelic; Hallucinogen

Legal status
- Legal status: AU: S9 (Prohibited substance); BR: Class F2 (Prohibited psychotropics); CA: Unscheduled.; DE: NpSG (Industrial and scientific use only); UK: Under Psychoactive Substances Act

Pharmacokinetic data
- Duration of action: 5–10 hours

Identifiers
- IUPAC name: (6aR,9R)-N,N-diethyl-7-methyl-4-cyclopropylmethanoyl-4,6,6a,7,8,9-hexahydroindolo[4,3-fg]quinoline-9-carboxamide
- CAS Number: 2767597-50-0
- PubChem CID: 155884675
- ChemSpider: 107450612
- UNII: 7UU7S6TN3J

Chemical and physical data
- Formula: C_{24}H_{29}N_{3}O_{2}
- Molar mass: 391.515 g·mol^{−1}
- 3D model (JSmol): Interactive image
- SMILES: CCN(CC)C(=O)[C@@H]5C=C2[C@@H](Cc3cn(C(=O)C1CC1)c4cccc2c34)N(C)C5
- InChI: InChI=1S/C24H29N3O2/c1-4-26(5-2)23(28)17-11-19-18-7-6-8-20-22(18)16(12-21(19)25(3)13-17)14-27(20)24(29)15-9-10-15/h6-8,11,14-15,17,21H,4-5,9-10,12-13H2,1-3H3/t17-,21-/m1/s1; Key:RAFUPYYDHPFASC-DYESRHJHSA-N

1cP-LSD, also known as 1-cyclopropanoyl-LSD or by the nickname Curie, is a psychedelic drug of the lysergamide family and an acylated derivative of lysergic acid diethylamide (LSD) which has been sold as a designer drug. It is a prodrug of LSD.

== Use and effects ==
1cP-LSD has been used in the form of blotter tabs containing 100 μg 1cP-LSD free base and pellets containing 150 μg 1cP-LSD hemitartrate. Its dose is said to be 100 to 200 μg and it has comparable potency to 1P-LSD and 1B-LSD. Its duration has been said to be 5 to 10 hours.

== Pharmacology ==
=== Pharmacodynamics ===
1cP-LSD is a prodrug of LSD. It has been found to produce psychedelic-like effects, specifically the head-twitch response, in rodents with similar potency as 1P-LSD.

== Chemistry ==
=== Analogues ===
Related compounds include 1B-LSD, 1DD-LSD, 1P-LSD, 1V-LSD, ALD-52 (1A-LSD), 1cP-AL-LAD, AL-LAD, ETH-LAD, 1P-ETH-LAD, PRO-LAD, LSM-775, and LSZ, among others.

== Society and culture ==
=== Legal status ===
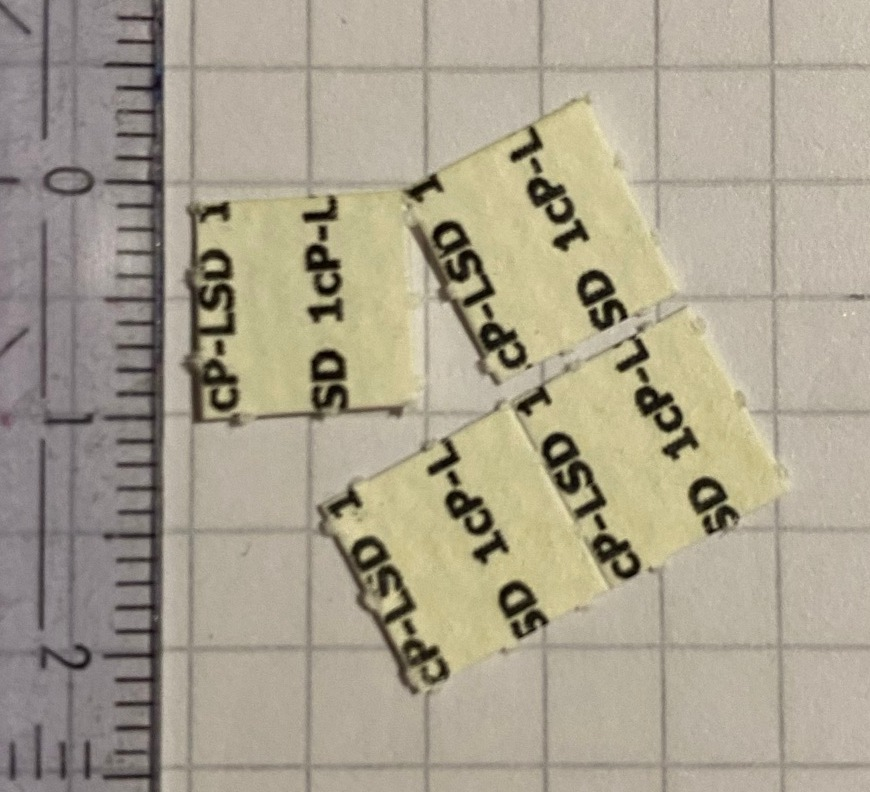
1cP-LSD on blotter paper.

==== Canada ====
1cP-LSD is not a controlled substance in Canada as of 2025.

==== Sweden ====
Sweden's public health agency suggested classifying 1cP-LSD as a dangerous substance on 18 December 2019 and later classified it as such on 22 April 2021.

==== United States ====
1cP-LSD is not an explicitly controlled substance in the United States. However, it could be considered a controlled substance under the Federal Analogue Act if intended for human consumption.

== Research ==
1cP-LSD has been investigated as a potential treatment for anxiety in dogs and cats.

== See also ==
- Substituted lysergamide
- Lizard Labs
