= 1T-LSD =

Chemical compound

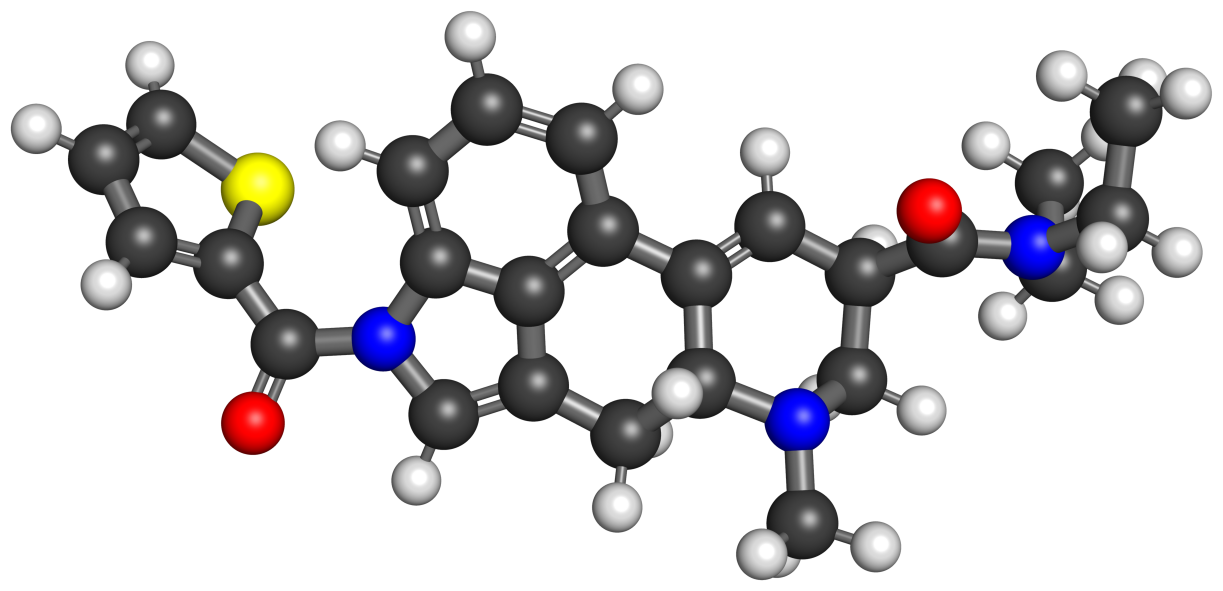

Clinical data
- Other names: 1-(Thiophene-2-carbonyl)-LSD; SYN-L-021
- Routes of administration: Oral
- Drug class: Serotonergic psychedelic; Hallucinogen

Identifiers
- IUPAC name: (6aR,9R)-N,N-diethyl-7-methyl-4-(thiophen-2-yl)methanoyl-4,6,6a,7,8,9-hexahydroindolo[4,3-fg]quinoline-9-carboxamide
- CAS Number: 3028949-85-8
- PubChem CID: 170763788
- ChemSpider: 129341136

Chemical and physical data
- Formula: C_{25}H_{27}N_{3}O_{2}S
- Molar mass: 433.57 g·mol^{−1}
- 3D model (JSmol): Interactive image
- SMILES: O=C(n1cc2C[C@@H]3C(=C[C@H](CN3C)C(=O)N(CC)CC)c3cccc1c32)c1cccs1

1T-LSD, also known as 1-(thiophene-2-carbonyl)-LSD or as SYN-L-021, is an acylated derivative of lysergic acid diethylamide (LSD), which has been sold as a designer drug. It was first identified in Japan in 2023 on blotter paper misrepresented as containing 1D-LSD, but which on analysis was determined to contain 1T-LSD instead. It was also detected in Germany around the same time.

== Use and effects ==
A 150 μg dose of 1T-LSD is said to be equivalent to 100 μg LSD. Doses of 87 to 100 μg 1T-LSD have been encountered in blotter tabs. It has also been encountered in tablets. As a prodrug of LSD, the drug is said to produce psychoactive effects comparable to LSD. There are no data on how delayed the onset of 1T-LSD may be compared to LSD.

== Chemistry ==
=== Analogues ===
Analogues of 1T-LSD include ALD-52 (1A-LSD), 1P-LSD, 1B-LSD, 1V-LSD, 1DD-LSD, and 1T-AL-LAD, among others.

== Society and culture ==
=== Legal status ===
==== Canada ====
1T-LSD is not a controlled substance in Canada as of 2025.

==== United States ====
1T-LSD is not an explicitly controlled substance in the United States. However, it could be considered a controlled substance under the Federal Analogue Act if intended for human consumption.

== See also ==
- Substituted lysergamide
- Lizard Labs
