= 1B-LSD =

Chemical compound

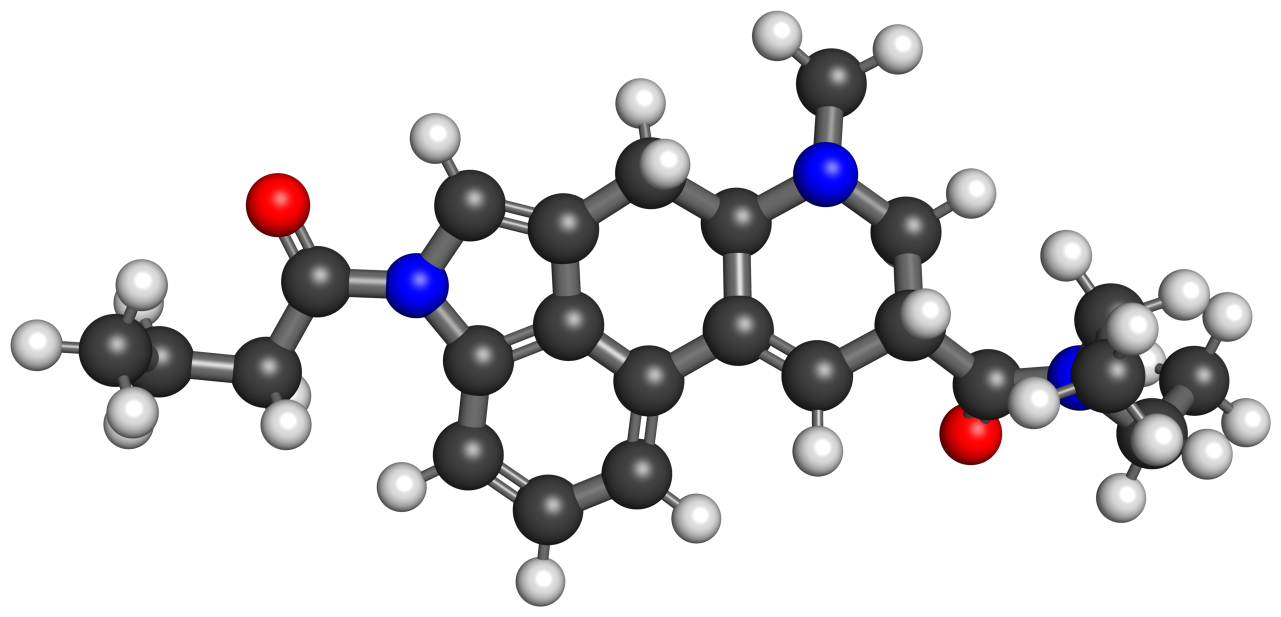

Clinical data
- Other names: 1-Butyryl-LSD; X-LSD
- Routes of administration: Oral
- Drug class: Serotonergic psychedelic; Hallucinogen

Legal status
- Legal status: AU: S8 (Controlled drug); BR: Class F2 (Prohibited psychotropics); CA: Unscheduled; DE: NpSG (Industrial and scientific use only); UK: Under Psychoactive Substances Act; US: Unscheduled (may be covered by the Federal Analogue Act if sold for human consumption); UN: Unscheduled

Identifiers
- IUPAC name: (6aR,9R)-N,N-diethyl-6-methyl-4-butanoyl-4,6,6a,7,8,9-hexahydroindolo[4,3-fg]quinoline-9-carboxamide
- CAS Number: 2349376-12-9
- PubChem CID: 145875086
- ChemSpider: 82827098
- UNII: Y6JQX3L6LP

Chemical and physical data
- Formula: C_{24}H_{31}N_{3}O_{2}
- Molar mass: 393.531 g·mol^{−1}
- 3D model (JSmol): Interactive image
- SMILES: CN1[C@](C2=C[C@@H](C(N(CC)CC)=O)C1)([H])CC3=CN(C(CCC)=O)C4=C3C2=CC=C4
- InChI: InChI=1S/C24H31N3O2/c1-5-9-22(28)27-15-16-13-21-19(18-10-8-11-20(27)23(16)18)12-17(14-25(21)4)24(29)26(6-2)7-3/h8,10-12,15,17,21H,5-7,9,13-14H2,1-4H3/t17-,21-/m1/s1; Key:SVRFNPSJPIDUBC-DYESRHJHSA-N

1B-LSD, also known as 1-butyryl-LSD, is a psychedelic drug of the lysergamide family and an acylated derivative of lysergic acid diethylamide (LSD) which has been sold as a designer drug.

== Pharmacology ==
=== Pharmacodynamics ===
1B-LSD has been found to produce psychedelic-like effects in rodents similarly to LSD, though with only around 1/7 the potency of LSD itself.

== Chemistry ==
=== Analogues ===
Related compounds include 1cP-LSD, 1P-LSD, 1V-LSD, ALD-52 (1A-LSD), 1cP-AL-LAD, AL-LAD, ETH-LAD, 1P-ETH-LAD, PRO-LAD, LSM-775, and LSZ, among others.

== Society and culture ==
=== Legal status ===
==== Canada ====
1B-LSD is not a controlled substance in Canada as of 2025.

==== Singapore ====
1B-LSD is illegal in Singapore. Sweden's public health agency suggested classifying 1B-LSD as a hazardous substance, on June 24, 2019.

==== United States ====
1B-LSD is not an explicitly controlled substance in the United States. However, it could be considered a controlled substance under the Federal Analogue Act if intended for human consumption.

== See also ==
- Substituted lysergamide
- Lizard Labs
