= 1P-AL-LAD =

Chemical compound

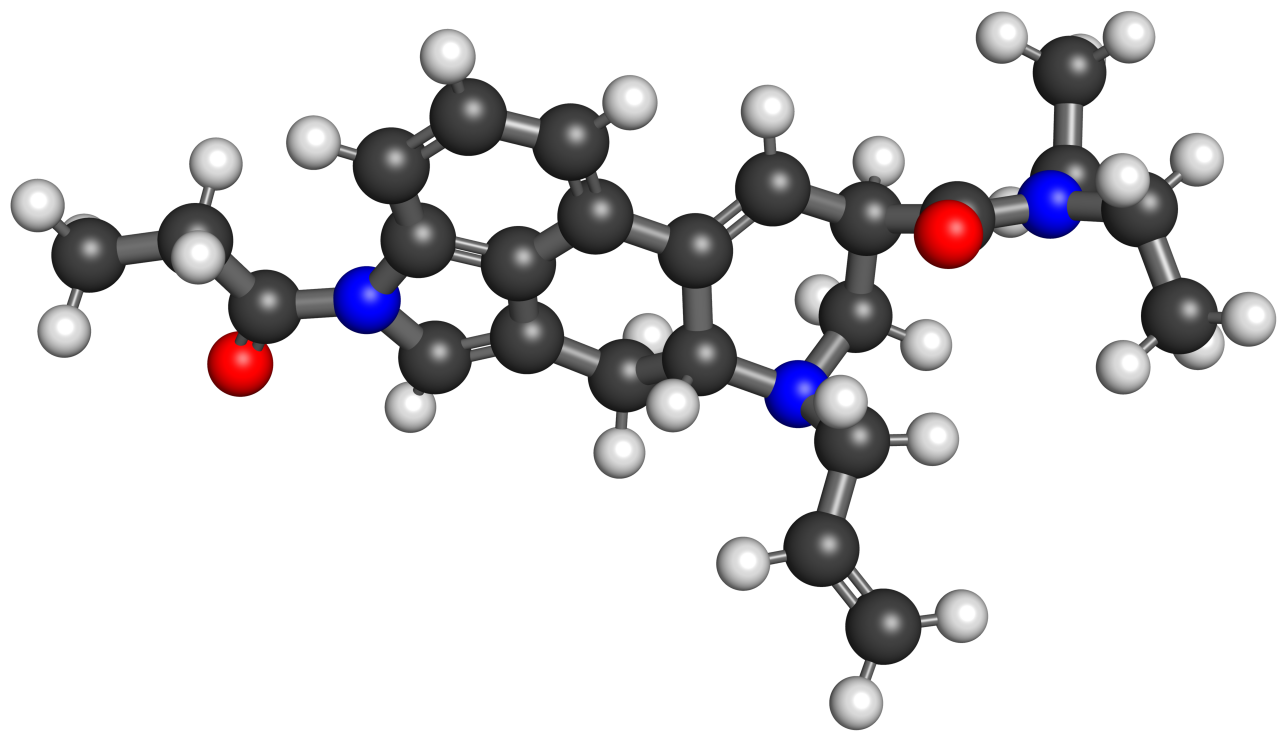

Clinical data
- Other names: 1-Propionyl-AL-LAD
- Routes of administration: Oral
- Drug class: Serotonergic psychedelic; Hallucinogen

Identifiers
- IUPAC name: (6aR,9R)-N,N-diethyl-4-propanoyl-7-prop-2-enyl-6,6a,8,9-tetrahydroindolo[4,3-fg]quinoline-9-carboxamide
- CAS Number: 3028950-71-9
- PubChem CID: 166091990

Chemical and physical data
- Formula: C_{25}H_{31}N_{3}O_{2}
- Molar mass: 405.542 g·mol^{−1}
- 3D model (JSmol): Interactive image
- SMILES: CCC(=O)N1C=C2C[C@@H]3C(=C[C@H](CN3CC=C)C(=O)N(CC)CC)C4=C2C1=CC=C4
- InChI: InChI=1S/C25H31N3O2/c1-5-12-27-15-18(25(30)26(7-3)8-4)13-20-19-10-9-11-21-24(19)17(14-22(20)27)16-28(21)23(29)6-2/h5,9-11,13,16,18,22H,1,6-8,12,14-15H2,2-4H3/t18-,22-/m1/s1; Key:GAGOTJNMWJYWMB-XMSQKQJNSA-N

1P-AL-LAD, also known as 1-propionyl-AL-LAD, is a derivative of lysergic acid diethylamide (LSD) which has psychedelic effects and has been sold as a designer drug. It is believed to act as a prodrug for AL-LAD and produces a head-twitch response in animal studies.

== Chemistry ==
=== Analogues ===
Analogues of 1P-AL-LAD include AL-LAD, 1cP-AL-LAD, 1T-AL-LAD, 1P-ETH-LAD, and 1P-LSD, among others.

== Society and culture ==
=== Legal status ===
==== Canada ====
1P-AL-LAD is not an explicitly nor implicitly controlled substance in Canada as of 2025.

==== United States ====
1P-AL-LAD is not an explicitly controlled substance in the United States. However, it could be considered a controlled substance under the Federal Analogue Act if intended for human consumption.

== See also ==
- Substituted lysergamide
- Lizard Labs
