= C24H31N3O2 =

The molecular formula C_{24}H_{31}N_{3}O_{2} (molar mass: 393.52 g/mol, exact mass: 393.2416 u) may refer to:

- Adamantyl-THPINACA
- 1B-LSD
- 1P-ETH-LAD
