= 1P-LSD =

Chemical compound

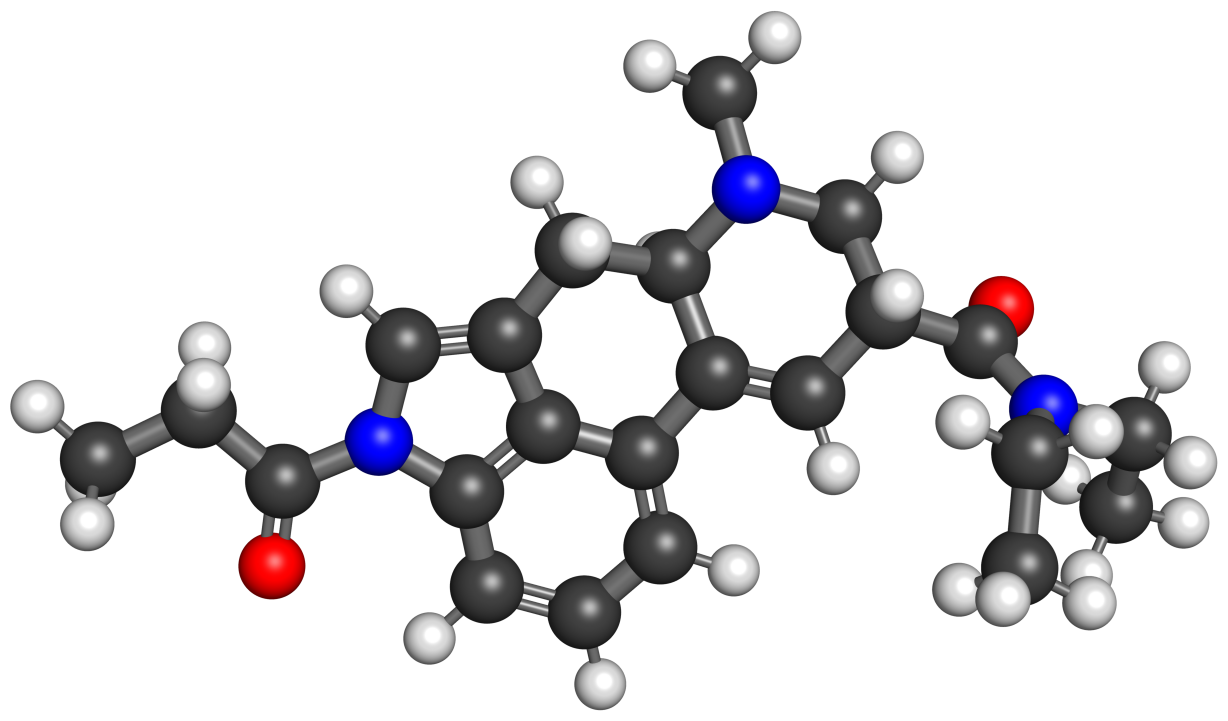

Clinical data
- Other names: 1-Propanoyl-lysergic acid diethylamide; 1-Propanoyl-LSD; 1-Propionyl-LSD
- Routes of administration: Oral
- Drug class: Serotonin receptor agonist; Serotonin 5-HT_{2A} receptor agonist; Serotonergic psychedelic; Hallucinogen
- ATC code: None

Legal status
- Legal status: AU: S8 (Controlled drug); BR: Class F2 (Prohibited psychotropics); CA: Unscheduled.; DE: NpSG (Industrial and scientific use only); UK: Under Psychoactive Substances Act; US: Unscheduled (may be considered illegal if sold for human consumption as an analog of LSD under the federal analogue act); UN: Unscheduled; In general Unscheduled, unless that was sold for human consumption, could be sold for medical and research purposes.

Pharmacokinetic data
- Bioavailability: ~100%
- Metabolism: Hydrolysis
- Metabolites: LSD
- Elimination half-life: Initial: ~0.2 hours
- Duration of action: 8–12 hours

Identifiers
- IUPAC name: (6aR,9R)-N,N-diethyl-7-methyl-4-propanoyl-6,6a,8,9-tetrahydroindolo[4,3-fg]quinoline-9-carboxamide
- CAS Number: 2349358-81-0
- PubChem CID: 119025985
- ChemSpider: 52085129
- UNII: 23R2G2G79C
- CompTox Dashboard (EPA): DTXSID701016895

Chemical and physical data
- Formula: C_{23}H_{29}N_{3}O_{2}
- Molar mass: 379.504 g·mol^{−1}
- 3D model (JSmol): Interactive image
- SMILES: CCN(CC)C(=O)[C@H]1CN(C)[C@@H]2Cc3cn(C(=O)CC)c4cccc(C2=C1)c34
- InChI: InChI=1S/C23H29N3O2/c1-5-21(27)26-14-15-12-20-18(17-9-8-10-19(26)22(15)17)11-16(13-24(20)4)23(28)25(6-2)7-3/h8-11,14,16,20H,5-7,12-13H2,1-4H3/t16-,20-/m1/s1; Key:JSMQOVGXBIDBIE-OXQOHEQNSA-N

1P-LSD, also known as 1-propionyl-LSD, is a psychedelic drug of the lysergamide family related to LSD. It is an amide derivative of LSD and a homologue of ALD-52 (1A-LSD). The drug originated in 2015 when it appeared as a designer drug sold online. It was first synthesized as a legal LSD alternative by Lizard Labs, a Netherlands based research chemical laboratory. It modifies the LSD molecule by adding a propionyl group to the nitrogen atom of LSD's indole group and is a prodrug of LSD.

== Use and effects ==
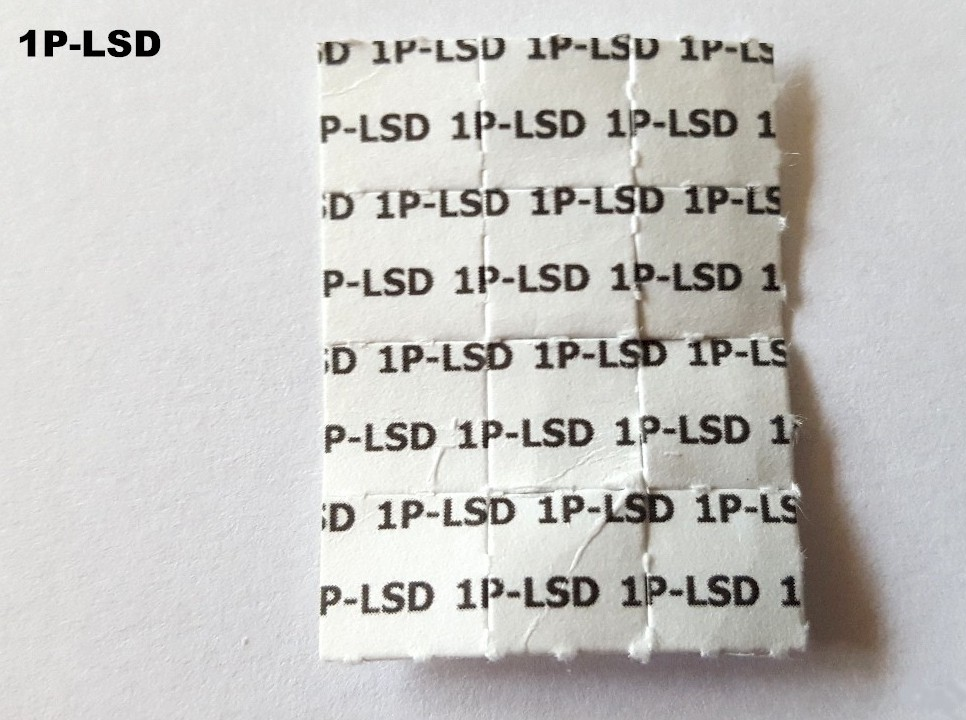
1P-LSD on blotter paper.

The dose range of 1P-LSD is 100 to 200 μg, with a typical dose estimate of 150 μg. Its duration is about 8 to 12 hours for most people. The subjective effects of 1P-LSD are not well-defined in the literature, although they are generally thought to be comparable to those of LSD. In a 2020 study, the qualitative effects of 1P-LSD and LSD were similar when measured using visual analog scales. The properties of 1P-LSD have also been assessed in other studies.

== Pharmacology ==
Like ALD-52 (1A-LSD), 1P-LSD is believed to act as a prodrug for LSD via hydrolysis of the propionyl group. When 1P-LSD is incubated in human serum or liver cells, administered intravenously to rats, or administered either orally or intravenously to human subjects, high levels of LSD and relatively low levels of 1P-LSD are quickly detected, demonstrating that 1P-LSD is rapidly hydrolyzed into LSD in vivo following ingestion. Indeed, following intravenous administration in humans 1P-LSD is detectable in serum for no longer than 4 hours, after which it is completely converted to LSD. These findings are supported by the similar duration and behavioral effects of 1P-LSD and LSD in both animal and human experiments.

== Chemistry ==
=== Synthesis ===
The chemical synthesis of 1P-LSD has been described in a patent from 2024.

=== Properties ===
The chemical stability of 1P-LSD has been studied.

=== Analogues ===
Related compounds include 1cP-LSD, 1B-LSD, 1D-LSD, 1V-LSD, ALD-52 (1A-LSD), 1cP-AL-LAD, AL-LAD, ETH-LAD, 1P-ETH-LAD, PRO-LAD, LSM-775, and LSZ, among others.

== History ==
1P-LSD was first described as well as encountered as a novel designer drug in 2015.

== Society and culture ==
=== Legal status ===
1P-LSD is unscheduled in the United States and Canada, but may be considered illegal if sold or used for human consumption as an analogue of LSD under the Federal Analogue Act in the United States. 1P-LSD is a prohibited or controlled substance in Australia, France, Finland, Denmark, Germany, Estonia, Japan, Latvia, Norway, Romania, Sweden, Switzerland, United Kingdom, Italy, Singapore, the Czech Republic, and Croatia. 1P-LSD has been illegal in Russia since 2017 as an LSD derivative.

== See also ==
- Substituted lysergamide
- Lizard Labs
- 4-AcO-DMT
