= Nor-LSD =

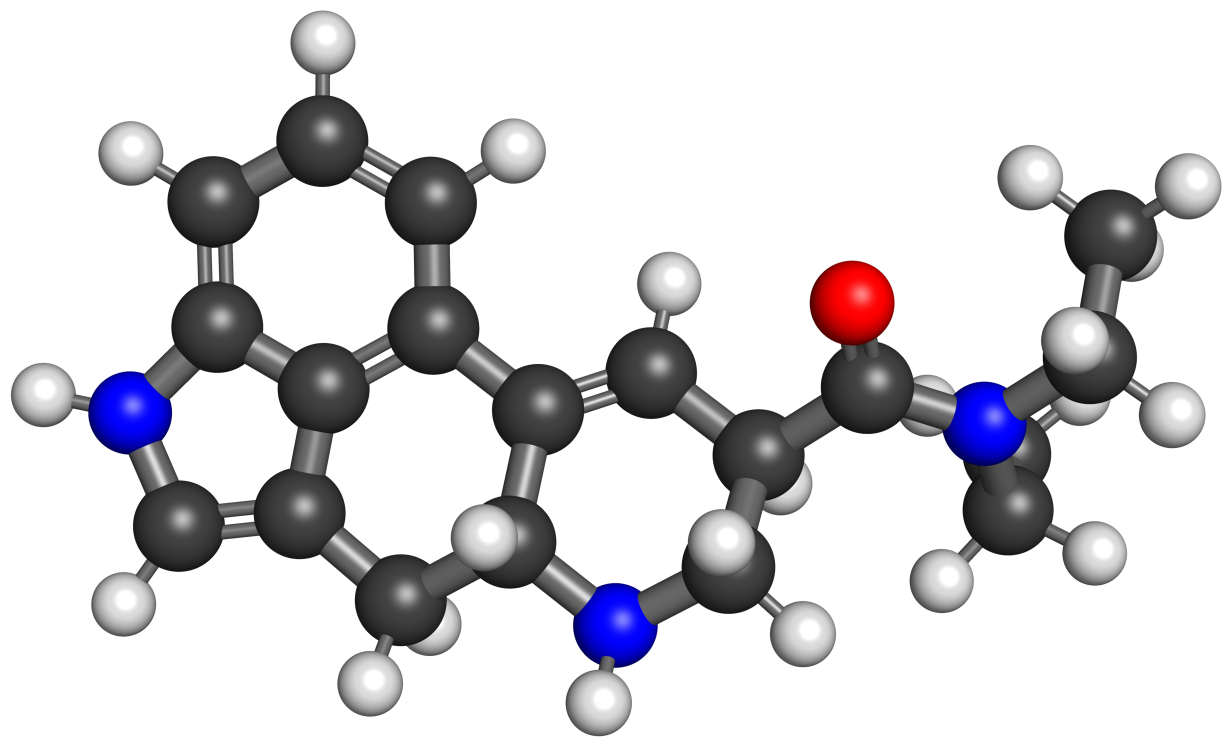

Clinical data
- Other names: norLSD; N,N-Diethyl-6-norlysergamide; N-Desmethyllysergic acid diethylamide; N-Desmethyl-LSD; Norlysergic acid diethylamide; N-Demethyl-LSD; 9,10-Didehydro-N,N-diethylergoline-8β-carboxamide; H-LAD; NORLAD; NOR-LAD; 6-Nor-LSD
- Drug class: Serotonin receptor modulator; Serotonergic psychedelic; Hallucinogen
- ATC code: None

Identifiers
- IUPAC name: (6aR,9R)-N,N-diethyl-4,6,6a,7,8,9-hexahydroindolo[4,3-fg]quinoline-9-carboxamide
- CAS Number: 35779-43-2
- PubChem CID: 169713
- ChemSpider: 148419
- ChEMBL: ChEMBL21343
- CompTox Dashboard (EPA): DTXSID80189307
- ECHA InfoCard: 100.164.623

Chemical and physical data
- Formula: C_{19}H_{23}N_{3}O
- Molar mass: 309.413 g·mol^{−1}
- 3D model (JSmol): Interactive image
- SMILES: CCN(CC)C(=O)[C@H]1CN[C@@H]2CC3=CNC4=CC=CC(=C34)C2=C1
- InChI: InChI=1S/C19H23N3O/c1-3-22(4-2)19(23)13-8-15-14-6-5-7-16-18(14)12(10-20-16)9-17(15)21-11-13/h5-8,10,13,17,20-21H,3-4,9,11H2,1-2H3/t13-,17-/m1/s1; Key:SUXLVXOMPKZBOV-CXAGYDPISA-N

Nor-LSD, or norLSD, also known as N,N-diethyl-6-norlysergamide or as N-desmethyllysergic acid diethylamide (N-desmethyl-LSD), is a serotonin receptor modulator and putative psychedelic of the lysergamide family related to lysergic acid diethylamide (LSD). It is the analogue of LSD in which the methyl group at the 6 position of the ergoline ring system has been removed.

== Use and effects ==
According to Alexander Shulgin, nor-LSD showed no psychedelic effects at assessed doses of up to 500 μg in humans, whereas LSD was active at doses as low as 50 μg. Higher doses of nor-LSD do not appear to have been assessed.

== Pharmacology ==
=== Pharmacodynamics ===
Nor-LSD showed 5- to 29-fold lower affinity for the serotonin 5-HT_{2} receptor compared to LSD (K_{i} = 30–158 nM vs. 5.4 nM, respectively). It also showed affinity for the serotonin 5-HT_{1} receptor. In another more recent study however, nor-LSD showed similar or even higher affinities, activational potencies, and/or efficacies at the serotonin 5-HT_{1A}, 5-HT_{2A}, and 5-HT_{2B} receptors as LSD, whereas it showed 36-fold lower affinity for the serotonin 5-HT_{2C} receptor compared to LSD.

Nor-LSD failed to completely substitute for LSD in rodent drug discrimination tests even at very high doses. The greatest degree of substitution with nor-LSD was 75% at a dose of 7,420 nM/kg, whereas 100% substitution occurred with LSD at a dose of 186 nM/kg (a 40-fold lower dose). The ED_{50} was 2,594 nM/kg for nor-LSD and 46 nM/kg for LSD. Hence, nor-LSD was approximately 56-fold less potent than LSD in terms of producing LSD-like effects in rodents and failed to produce full LSD-like effects even at the highest assessed dose. In another study, nor-LSD failed to produce LSD-like electroencephalogram (EEG) changes in rabbits.

=== Pharmacokinetics ===
Nor-LSD has been reported to occur as a metabolite of LSD in rats and humans.

== Chemistry ==
=== Derivatives ===
Derivatives of nor-LSD substituted at the 6 position include LSD (METH-LAD; 6-methyl), ETH-LAD (6-ethyl), PRO-LAD (6-propyl), BU-LAD (6-butyl), AL-LAD (6-allyl), and PARGY-LAD (6-propynyl), among others. There appears to be a length of about 3 carbon atoms that can be tolerated at the 6 position before potent psychedelic activity is lost.

== History ==
Nor-LSD was first described in the scientific literature, by Yuji Nakahara and Tetsukichi Niwaguchi, by at least 1971.

== See also ==
- Substituted lysergamide
