= C25H27N3O2S =

The molecular formula C_{25}H_{27}N_{3}O_{2}S may refer to:

- Brexpiprazole, used as an anti-psychotic medication
- 1T-LSD, a derivative of LSD
