= David E. Nichols =

American pharmacologist and medicinal chemist (born 1944)

David Earl Nichols
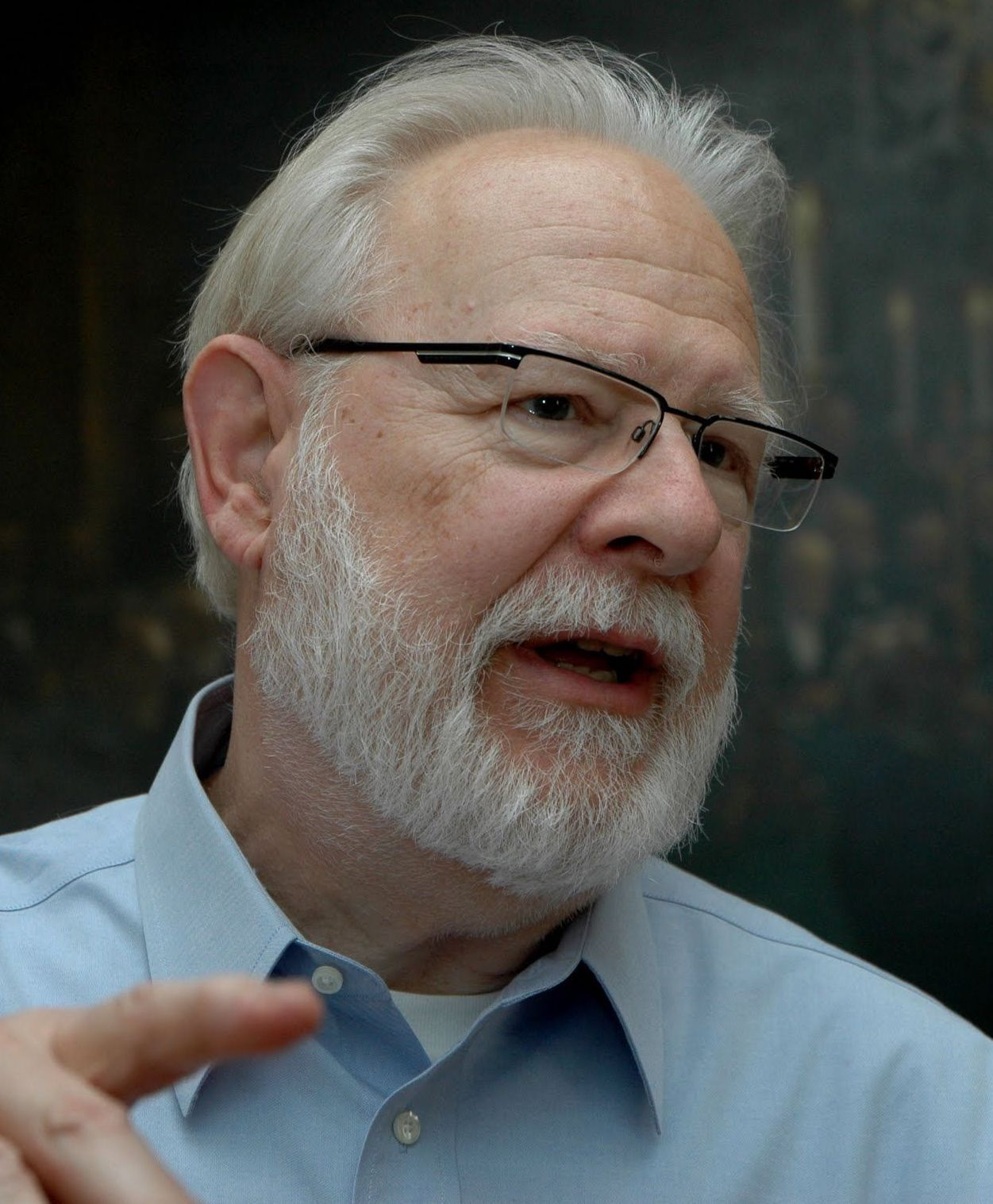
- Born: December 23, 1944 (age 81); Covington, Kentucky, US
- Education: University of Cincinnati (BS, 1969); University of Iowa (PhD, 1973)
- Known for: Extensive research into 5-HT_{2A} receptor and dopamine receptors, SAR of hallucinogens, research into MDMA neurotoxicity and MDMA analogues
- Scientific career
- Fields: Medicinal chemistry Pharmacology
- Workplaces: University of Iowa; Purdue University; Indiana University School of Medicine; University of North Carolina at Chapel Hill

David Earl Nichols (born December 23, 1944) is an American pharmacologist and medicinal chemist. Previously the Robert C. and Charlotte P. Anderson Distinguished Chair in Pharmacology at Purdue University, Nichols has worked in the field of psychoactive drugs since 1969. While still a graduate student, he patented the method that is used to make the optical isomers of psychedelic amphetamines. His contributions include the synthesis and reporting of escaline, LSZ, 6-APB, 2C-I-NBOMe and other NBOMe variants (NBOMe-2C-B, NBOMe-2C-C, NBOMe-2C-D), and several others, as well as the coining of the term "entactogen".

He is the founding president of the Heffter Research Institute, named after German chemist and pharmacologist Arthur Heffter, who first discovered that mescaline was the active component in the peyote cactus. In 2004 he was named the Irwin H. Page Lecturer by the former International Serotonin Club (now the International Society for Serotonin Research), and delivered an address in Portugal titled, "35 years studying psychedelics: what a long strange trip it's been". Among pharmacologists, he is considered to be one of the world's top experts on psychedelics. He has also been described as the "greatest living psychedelic chemist" or "greatest living psychedelic scientist" by Hamilton Morris and others in the 2020s. Nichols's other professional activities include teaching medicinal chemistry and molecular pharmacology at Purdue University in West Lafayette, IN, and teaching medical students at the Indiana University School of Medicine. He officially retired in 2012 but has continued to work in the field. As of 2019, Nichols was an adjunct professor at the UNC Eshelman School of Pharmacy, Chapel Hill, NC.

== Education ==
- BS – University of Cincinnati (1969)
- PhD – University of Iowa (1973)
- Postdoctoral researcher – University of Iowa (1973–74)

== Research areas ==
Nichols is still carrying out academic research on the chemistry of psychedelics. He has published approximately 250 scientific reports and book chapters, all describing the relationship between the structure of a molecule and its biological effects (often referred to as a Structure-activity relationship, or SAR). He has done extensive work using the rat model assay of drug discrimination in characterizing hallucinogenic drugs. Although his research mostly uses rats, a number of compounds included in Shulgin's PIHKAL were actually first synthesized in Nichols's lab. His lab also first developed [^{125}I]-(R)-DOI as a radioligand. Nichols is one of the few people who has published legitimate research on the chemistry and pharmacology of LSD in the last 20 years, and first reported that several LSD analogues, including ETH-LAD, PRO-LAD, and AL-LAD, were more potent than LSD itself. Their human effects are described in TiHKAL. He also improved the synthesis of psilocybin so that it could be accessible for several recent clinical studies.

Other notable research that he helped carry out includes extensive studies of the structure-activity relationships and mechanisms of action of MDA and MDMA, during which he helped to discover many novel analogues including such compounds as 5-methyl-MDA, 4-MTA and MDAI. Nichols has said that he believes gray-market chemists used information from papers he published on 4-methylthioamphetamine (MTA) in the 1990s to synthesize the drug, which they sold in tablets nicknamed "flatliners" as a substitute for MDMA (Ecstasy).

More recently, Nichols has become one of the world leaders in research on dopamine, and his team has developed several notable dopamine receptor ligands, including the selective D_{1} full agonist compounds dihydrexidine and dinapsoline which have been researched for the treatment of Parkinson's disease, as well as a number of other subtype-selective dopamine agonists derived from dinoxyline. He co-founded DarPharma, Inc. to commercialize his dopamine compounds; several of his team's compounds are now being studied in clinical trials for the treatment of Parkinson's disease and the cognitive and memory deficits of schizophrenia.

== Impact on the designer drug market ==
Designer drug producers who scan scientific literature for information on compounds with potential grey market value have described Nichols' publications as an "especially valuable" road map to making new designer drugs. Several deaths have been attributed to compounds that have been discovered in Nichols' lab, which he finds quite upsetting, "I was stunned by this revelation, and it left me with a hollow and depressed feeling for some time."

== Personal life ==
Nichols has disclosed that he is writing three books as of the 2020s. These books include a memoir, a collection of his letters with Alexander Shulgin, and a science fiction novel.

== See also ==
- List of psychedelic chemists
- Alexander Shulgin
- Charles D. Nichols
- Richard Glennon
- Robert Oberlender
- Peyton Jacob III
- Daniel Trachsel
- Jonathan Ott
- Jason Wallach
- Adam Halberstadt
- Matthew J. Baggott
- Rick Strassman
- Casey William Hardison
- Bromo-DragonFLY
- TCB-2
- 25I-NBOMe
- Lysergic acid 2,4-dimethylazetidide
- 4-MTA
- MDAI
- Dihydrexidine
- Dinapsoline
