= Dinapsoline =

Chemical compound

Clinical data
- ATC code: none

Identifiers
- IUPAC name: 8,9-dihydroxy-2,3,7,11b-tetrahydro-1H-naph[1,2,3-de]isoquinoline
- CAS Number: 458563-40-1
- PubChem CID: 9816455
- ChemSpider: 7992205
- UNII: GZ9XC6C5P9
- CompTox Dashboard (EPA): DTXSID50431229

Chemical and physical data
- Formula: C_{16}H_{15}NO_{2}
- Molar mass: 253.301 g·mol^{−1}
- 3D model (JSmol): Interactive image
- SMILES: Oc1c3c(ccc1O)[C@H]4c2c(cccc2C3)CNC4
- InChI: InChI=1S/C16H15NO2/c18-14-5-4-11-12(16(14)19)6-9-2-1-3-10-7-17-8-13(11)15(9)10/h1-5,13,17-19H,6-8H2/t13-/m0/s1; Key:ZQTSNGJHMUKLOM-ZDUSSCGKSA-N

Dinapsoline is a drug developed for the treatment of Parkinson's disease, that acts as a selective full agonist at the dopamine D_{1} receptor.
