= 1V-LSD =

Chemical compound

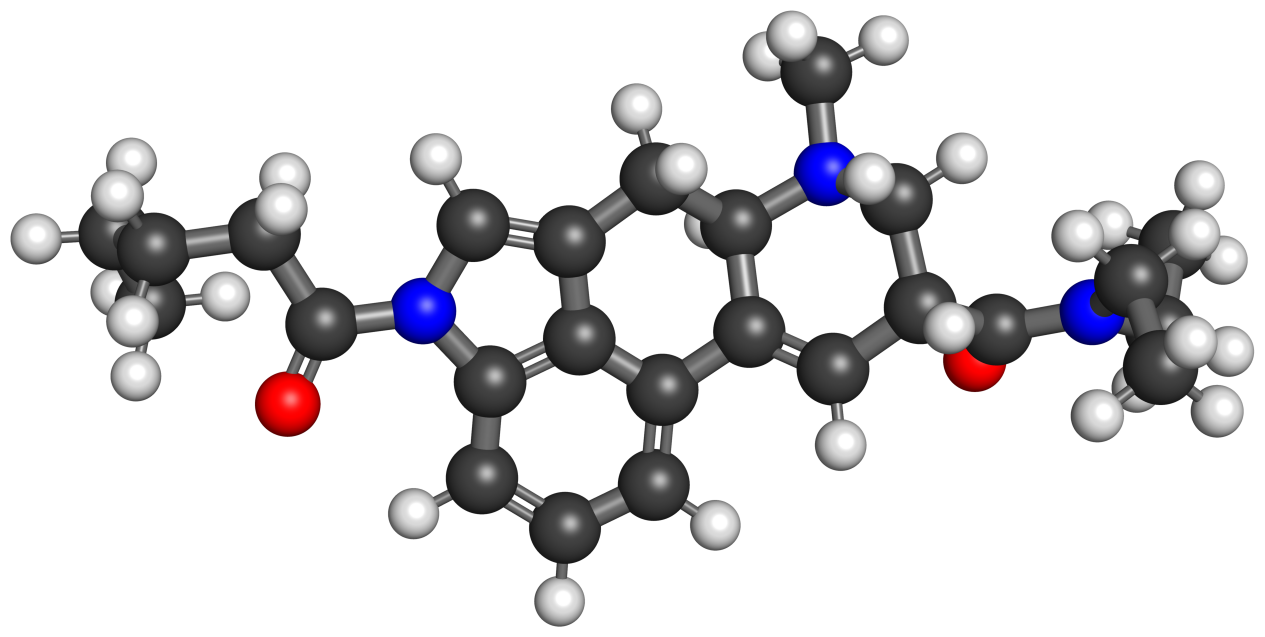

Clinical data
- Other names: 1-Valeryl-LSD; 1-Valeroyl-LSD; 1-Pentanoyl-LSD; Valerie; 1-Valeryl-N,N-diethyllysergamide
- Routes of administration: Oral
- Drug class: Serotonergic psychedelic; Hallucinogen

Legal status
- Legal status: AU: S8 (Controlled drug); CA: Unscheduled; DE: NpSG (Industrial and scientific use only); UK: Under Psychoactive Substances Act; US: Unscheduled (when wasn't sold for human consumption); UN: Unscheduled

Pharmacokinetic data
- Duration of action: 6–8 hours (reportedly)

Identifiers
- IUPAC name: (6aR,9R)-N,N-Diethyl-7-methyl-4-pentanoyl-4,,6,6a,7,8,9-hexahydroindolo[4,3-fg]quinoline-9-carboxamide
- CAS Number: 3028950-70-8
- PubChem CID: 162368540
- UNII: V9TJ3HT283
- CompTox Dashboard (EPA): DTXSID801342453

Chemical and physical data
- Formula: C_{25}H_{33}N_{3}O_{2}
- Molar mass: 407.558 g·mol^{−1}
- 3D model (JSmol): Interactive image
- SMILES: CCN(CC)C(=O)[C@@H]5C=C2[C@@H](Cc3cn(C(=O)CCCC)c4cccc2c34)N(C)C5
- InChI: InChI=1S/C25H33N3O2/c1-5-8-12-23(29)28-16-17-14-22-20(19-10-9-11-21(28)24(17)19)13-18(15-26(22)4)25(30)27(6-2)7-3/h9-11,13,16,18,22H,5-8,12,14-15H2,1-4H3/t18-,22-/m1/s1; Key:GIIBVGJWUZNECE-XMSQKQJNSA-N

1V-LSD, also known as 1-valeryl-LSD or by the nickname Valerie, is a psychedelic drug of the lysergamide family related to lysergic acid diethylamide (LSD). It is an analogue of LSD and is thought to act as a prodrug of LSD. The drug has been encountered as a novel designer recreational drug.

== Use and effects ==
1V-LSD has been sold in the form of blotter containing 150 μg per tab. Its effects are said to be comparable to 100 to 120 μg 1P-LSD or 1cP-LSD, but with a longer duration. On the other hand, other sources report that 1V-LSD has a shorter duration than LSD of 6 to 8 hours.

== Pharmacology ==
=== Pharmacodynamics ===
As demonstrated with other N-acylated derivatives of LSD, 1V-LSD is believed to serve as a prodrug for LSD but may also act directly as a weak partial agonist at the serotonin 5-HT_{2A} receptor.

A head-twitch response assay in mice found that 1V-LSD has a similar potency to 1P-LSD and 1cP-LSD, with behavioral effects also closely resembling these structural analogs.

== Toxicity ==
In a study employing computational methods for predictive analysis in silico, 1V-LSD exhibited notably high values for certain parameters associated with potential pulmonary toxicity and cardiotoxicity when compared to other lysergamides examined, such as 1B-LSD, 1cP-LSD, 1P-LSD, and ALD-52.

== Chemistry ==
=== Synthesis ===
1V-LSD is the condensation product of valeric acid (pentanoic acid) and LSD, where the valeroyl group is substituted on the NH position of the indole moiety.

=== Detection ===
Ehrlich's reagent is used to identify the presence of an indole moiety; the chemical backbone of the lysergamide and ergoline molecules. However, as with other N-acylated lysergamides, 1V-LSD reacts very slowly to Ehrlich reagent and may not give reliable results if the reagent isn't fresh.

=== Analogues ===
Related compounds include 1B-LSD, 1cP-LSD, 1D-LSD, 1P-LSD, and AL-LAD, among others.

== History ==
1V-LSD was first described in the scientific literature by 2022.

== Society and culture ==
=== Legal status ===
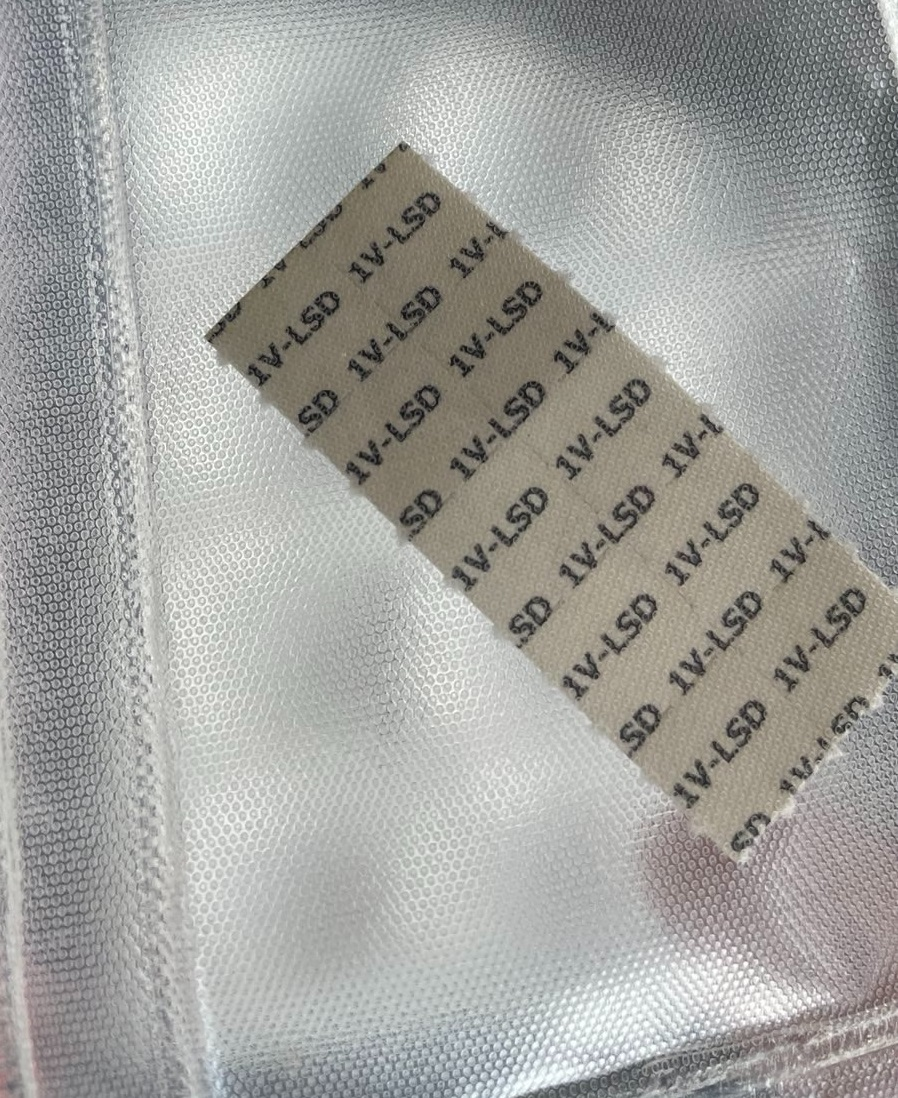
1v-LSD strip blotters.

==== Canada ====
1V-LSD is not an explicitly nor implicitly controlled substance in Canada as of 2025.

==== Germany ====
An amendment to the NpSG banned the sale of 1V-LSD in Germany in September 2022. Due to a interpunctation error in the actualised NpSG, the ban never took effect. The law was amended in March 2023, now banning 1V-LSD.

==== Poland ====
1V-LSD has been a controlled substance in Poland since 2024.

==== South Korea ====
1V-LSD was placed under legal control in South Korea in July 2022 on a temporary but renewable basis.

==== Sweden ====
Since 2 March 2022, 1V-LSD has been under investigation in Sweden and may therefore soon become controlled.

==== United States ====
1V-LSD is not an explicitly controlled substance in the United States. However, it could be considered a controlled substance under the Federal Analogue Act if intended for human consumption.

== See also ==
- Substituted lysergamide
- Lizard Labs
