= ETH-LAD =

Chemical compound

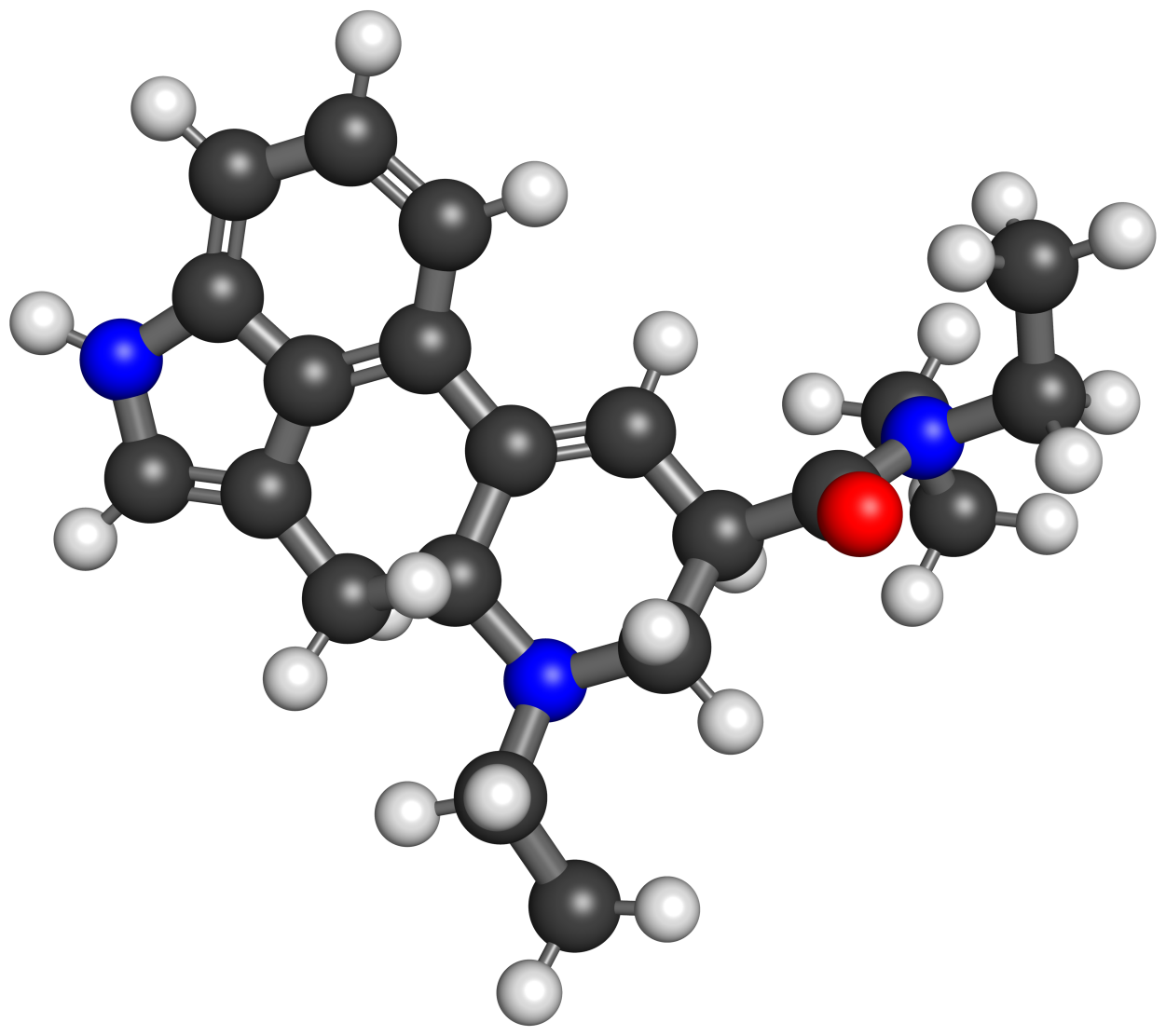

Clinical data
- Other names: ETH-LAD; ETHLAD; 6-Ethyl-6-nor-lysergic acid diethylamide; 6-Ethyl-6-nor-LSD; N(6)-Ethyl-nor-LSD; 9,10-Didehydro-N,N,6-triethylergoline-8β-carboxamide
- Routes of administration: Oral
- Drug class: Serotonin receptor agonist; Serotonergic psychedelic; Hallucinogen

Legal status
- Legal status: DE: NpSG (Industrial and scientific use only); UK: Class A; Illegal in France

Pharmacokinetic data
- Onset of action: 15 minutes–1 hour
- Duration of action: 8–12 hours

Identifiers
- IUPAC name: (6aR,9R)-N,N-diethyl-7-ethyl-4,6,6a,7,8,9- hexahydroindolo-[4,3-fg]quinoline-9-carboxamide
- CAS Number: 65527-62-0
- PubChem CID: 44457783
- ChemSpider: 21106300
- UNII: 21Z2736X9Q
- ChEMBL: ChEMBL22694
- CompTox Dashboard (EPA): DTXSID90215823

Chemical and physical data
- Formula: C_{21}H_{27}N_{3}O
- Molar mass: 337.467 g·mol^{−1}
- 3D model (JSmol): Interactive image
- SMILES: CCN(C([C@@H]1C=C2C3=CC=CC4=C3C(C[C@H]2N(CC)C1)=CN4)=O)CC
- InChI: InChI=1S/C21H27N3O/c1-4-23(5-2)21(25)15-10-17-16-8-7-9-18-20(16)14(12-22-18)11-19(17)24(6-3)13-15/h7-10,12,15,19,22H,4-6,11,13H2,1-3H3/t15-,19-/m1/s1; Key:MYNOUXJLOHVSMQ-DNVCBOLYSA-N

ETH-LAD, or ETHLAD, also known as 6-ethyl-6-nor-LSD, is a psychedelic drug of the lysergamide family related to lysergic acid diethylamide (LSD; also known as METH-LAD). It is slightly more potent than LSD and is therefore among the most potent psychedelics known. The drug is taken orally.

It acts as a serotonin receptor agonist, including of the serotonin 5-HT_{2A} receptor. In addition, it binds to dopamine receptors. The drug produces psychedelic-like effects in animals. It is closely structurally related to LSD and to other psychedelic lysergamides like PRO-LAD and AL-LAD.

ETH-LAD was first described in the scientific literature by 1976. Its effects in humans were assessed and reported by Alexander Shulgin in the 1980s and 1990s. The drug was encountered as a novel recreational designer drug in Europe by 2016. In addition, a prodrug of ETH-LAD, 1P-ETH-LAD, has been sold on darkweb markets.

== Use and effects ==
According to Alexander Shulgin in his book TiHKAL (Tryptamines I Have Known and Loved), ETH-LAD has a dose of 40 to 150 μg orally and a duration of 8 to 12 hours. However, it also produced clear effects at a dose of 20 μg, and in other publications, Shulgin gave a lower dose range for the drug of 40 to 80 μg. Its onset ranges from 15 minutes to 1 hour and peak effects occur after about 1 to 2 hours.

Shulgin has stated that ETH-LAD is "a little more potent" than LSD or roughly twice as potent as LSD in humans. Other researchers have described it as "slightly more potent" or "somewhat more potent" than LSD in humans. For comparison, Shulgin lists the dose range of LSD as 60 to 200 μg or 50 to 200 μg in his publications. Based on the preceding findings, ETH-LAD is one of the most potent serotonergic psychedelics known in humans, if not the most potent known psychedelic. As a result of this, it has been said that LSD can no longer be considered the most potent psychedelic.

The effects of ETH-LAD have been reported to include closed-eye imagery, very few visual changes or distortions, gentle movements of objects, LSD-like visual aspects, two-dimensional surfaces looking three-dimensional, objects looking "magical", and possible time slowing. It was described as making the body feel balanced, thinking being easy, concepts easy to follow through, mind capable of realistic and down-to-earth thought, and warmth and humor being present. Other reported effects included feeling lazy, diuretic effects, no appetite loss, decongestant effects, stomach discomfort, and chills.

Compared to LSD, ETH-LAD was described as lacking the push and sparkle of LSD, allowing for extraordinary experiences with none of LSD's demands, being less aggressive than LSD and lacking its "taking control" nature, having a greatly modified degree of visual distortion relative to LSD, having visual effects similar to LSD but much more gentle, and being more allowing than demanding.

Informal online anecdotal reports have described ETH-LAD as highly visual, introspective, and sometimes more "analytical" or "neutral" than LSD, but have also reported heavier body load and stronger physical side effects such as nausea and discomfort especially at high doses. Other reported effects have included positive after-effects like increased creativity and well-being as well as adverse reactions such as confusion, emotional distress, and rarely severe agitation and paranoia.

== Overdose ==
A case report of ETH-LAD overdose has been published. The symptoms were rated as moderate to severe and included acute aggression, agitation, unconsciousness, metabolic disturbances, and persistent psychosis. Some of the findings were described as unexpected and it was concluded that ETH-LAD may lead to severe toxic effects in overdose in contrast to LSD which is generally well-tolerated. Treatment included benzodiazepines and dexmedetomidine for sedation, antipsychotics for psychotic symptoms, and intensive care for physical complications.

== Pharmacology ==
=== Pharmacodynamics ===
ETH-LAD acts as a serotonin receptor agonist with a strong binding affinity to the serotonin 5-HT_{2A} receptor. It shows greater potency and efficacy as a serotonin 5-HT_{2A} receptor agonist than LSD in vitro. In addition to the serotonin 5-HT_{2A} receptor, the drug binds with high affinity to the serotonin 5-HT_{1A} and 5-HT_{2C} receptors. Like LSD, ETH-LAD also binds with lower affinity to the dopamine D_{1}, D_{2}, D_{3}, D_{4}, and D_{5} receptors.

ETH-LAD shows psychedelic-like effects in rodent drug discrimination tests. It is about 1.6- to 2.3-fold more potent than LSD in these tests. Similarly to LSD, ETH-LAD shows moderate anti-inflammatory effects in preclinical research, but with a slightly higher potency.

=== Pharmacokinetics ===
The in-vitro metabolism of ETH-LAD has been studied.

== Chemistry ==
ETH-LAD, also known as 9,10-didehydro-N,N,6-triethylergoline-8β-carboxamide or as 6-ethyl-6-nor-LSD, is a substituted lysergamide derivative related to lysergic acid diethylamide (LSD; also known as METH-LAD). It is the 6-ethyl derivative of nor-LSD (6-nor-LSD; H-LAD) and is the derivative of LSD with an ethyl group instead of methyl group at the 6 position of the ergoline ring system.

=== Properties ===
According to Alexander Shulgin, ETH-LAD may be chemically unstable in solution.

=== Synthesis ===
The chemical synthesis of ETH-LAD has been described.

=== Analogues ===
Analogues of ETH-LAD include nor-LSD, LSD, PRO-LAD, IP-LAD, AL-LAD, FLUORETH-LAD, and CE-LAD, among others. 1P-ETH-LAD, a prodrug of ETH-LAD, has been developed and encountered as a novel designer drug.

== History ==
ETH-LAD was first described in the scientific literature by Tetsukichi Niwaguchi and colleagues by 1976. Subsequently, its preclinical pharmacology was studied and described by Andrew J. Hoffman and David E. Nichols in 1985. ETH-LAD's properties and effects in humans were assessed by Alexander Shulgin. These observations were reported via personal communication by Nichols in 1986, later described by Shulgin himself in a 1994 literature review, and described in-depth by Shulgin himself in his 1997 book TiHKAL (Tryptamines I Have Known and Loved). ETH-LAD was encountered as a novel designer drug in Europe by 2016.

== Society and culture ==
=== Legal status ===
==== Canada ====
ETH-LAD is not a controlled substance in Canada as of 2025.

==== Switzerland ====
ETH-LAD is illegal in Switzerland as of December 2015.

==== United Kingdom ====
On June 10, 2014, the United Kingdom Advisory Council on the Misuse of Drugs (ACMD) recommended that ETH-LAD be specifically named in the UK Misuse of Drugs Act as a class A drug despite not identifying it as ever having been sold or any harm associated with its use. The UK Home office accepted this advice and announced a ban of the substance to be enacted on 6 January 2015.

==== United States ====
ETH-LAD is not an explicitly controlled substance in the United States. However, it could be considered a controlled substance under the Federal Analogue Act if intended for human consumption.

== See also ==
- Substituted lysergamide
- Lizard Labs
