= 1cP-AL-LAD =

Chemical compound

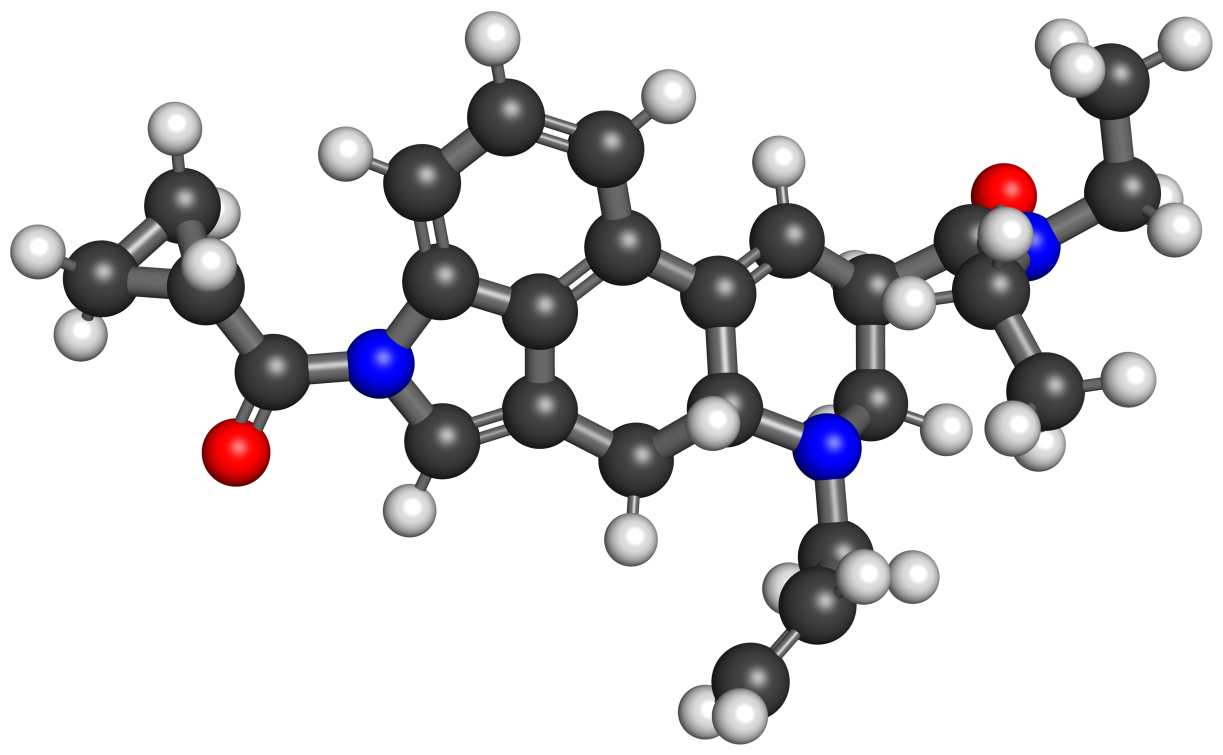

Clinical data
- Routes of administration: Oral
- Drug class: Serotonergic psychedelic; Hallucinogen

Pharmacokinetic data
- Duration of action: 7–10 hours

Identifiers
- IUPAC name: (6aR,9R)-4-(cyclopropanecarbonyl)-N,N-diethyl-7-prop-2-enyl-6,6a,8,9-tetrahydroindolo[4,3-fg]quinoline-9-carboxamide
- CAS Number: 3028950-72-0
- PubChem CID: 162368406
- UNII: HH7F72QLZ3
- CompTox Dashboard (EPA): DTXSID301342446

Chemical and physical data
- Formula: C_{26}H_{31}N_{3}O_{2}
- Molar mass: 417.553 g·mol^{−1}
- 3D model (JSmol): Interactive image
- SMILES: CCN(CC)C(=O)[C@@H]1C=C2[C@@H](Cc3cn(C(=O)C4CC4)c4cccc2c34)N(C1)CC=C
- InChI: InChI=1S/C26H31N3O2/c1-4-12-28-15-19(25(30)27(5-2)6-3)13-21-20-8-7-9-22-24(20)18(14-23(21)28)16-29(22)26(31)17-10-11-17/h4,7-9,13,16-17,19,23H,1,5-6,10-12,14-15H2,2-3H3/t19-,23-/m1/s1; Key:VSABTUDYQCMWKE-AUSIDOKSSA-N

1cP-AL-LAD is a psychedelic drug of the lysergamide family related to lysergic acid diethylamide (LSD). It is thought to act as prodrug of AL-LAD. The drug has been encountered as a novel designer drug.

== Use and effects ==
The dose of 1cP-AL-LAD ranges from 20 to 350 μg orally, with an average dose being 100 to 225 μg. Its duration is said to be 7 to 10 hours. The drug is said to produce psychedelic effects that are weaker and shorter-lasting than those of LSD.

== Chemistry ==
=== Analogues ===
Related compounds include 1cP-LSD, 1D-LSD, 1P-AL-LAD, and 1T-AL-LAD, among others.

== History ==
1cP-AL-LAD has been sold as a designer drug. It was first identified online in December 2020 and in France in June 2021.

== Society and culture ==
=== Legal status ===
==== Canada ====
1cP-AL-LAD is not a controlled substance in Canada as of 2025.

==== United States ====
1cP-AL-LAD is not an explicitly controlled substance in the United States. However, it could be considered a controlled substance under the Federal Analogue Act if intended for human consumption.

== See also ==
- Substituted lysergamide
- Lizard Labs
