= AL-LAD =

Chemical compound (psychedelic drug)

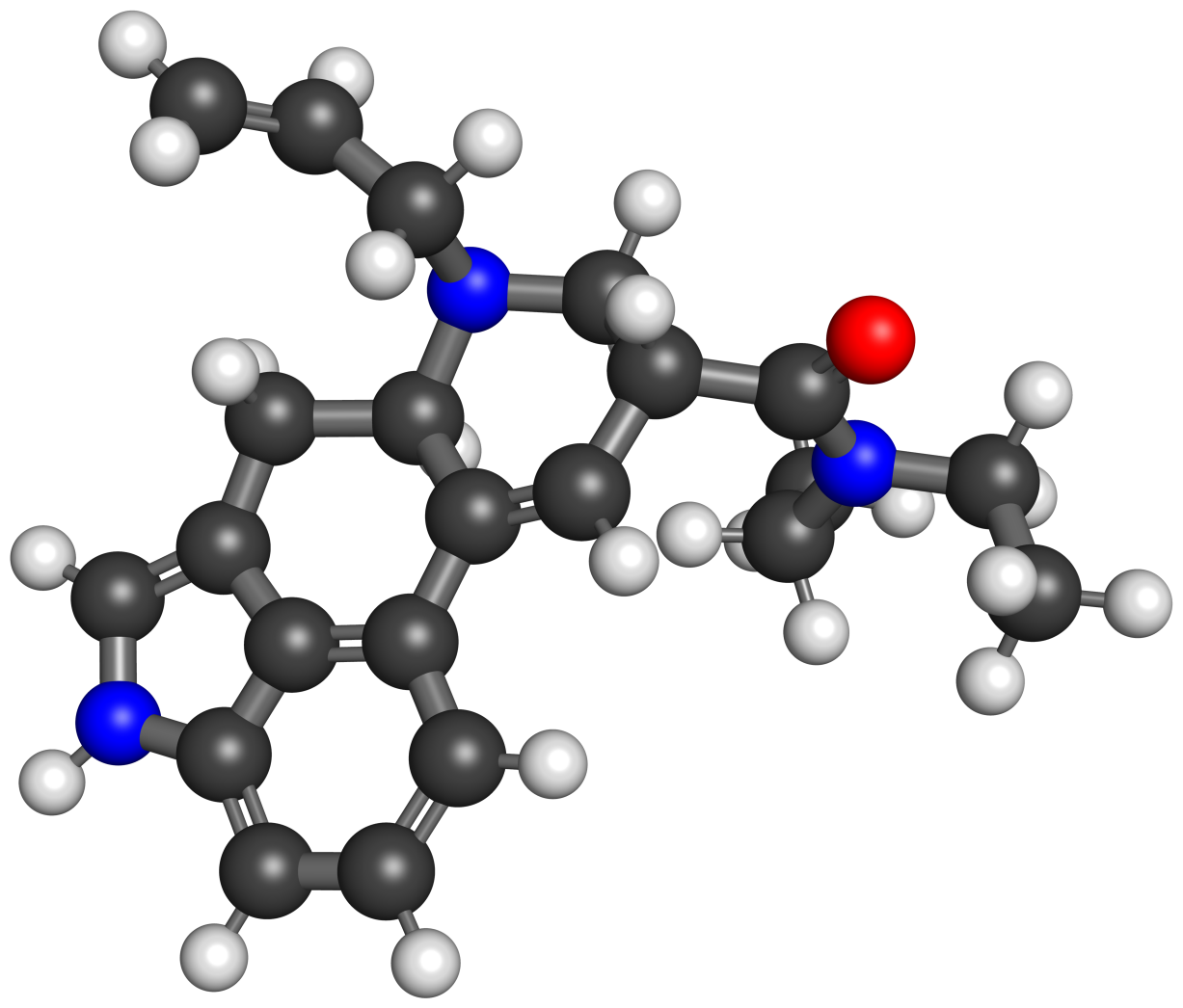

Clinical data
- Other names: ALLAD; AllylLAD; Allyl-LAD; ALLYLAD; AllyLAD; ALLY-LAD; 6-Allyl-6-nor-LSD; 6-Allyl-6-nor-N,N-diethyllysergamide; 9,10-Didehydro-6-allyl-N,N-diethylergoline-8β-carboxamide
- Routes of administration: Oral
- Drug class: Non-selective serotonin receptor agonist; Serotonin 5-HT_{2A} receptor agonist; Serotonergic psychedelic; Hallucinogen
- ATC code: None

Legal status
- Legal status: AU: Unscheduled; CA: Unscheduled.; DE: NpSG (Industrial and scientific use only); UK: Class A; US: Unscheduled, could be illegal if is sold for human consumption under the Federal Analogue Act.; Illegal in Denmark, Sweden, Switzerland and France, could be illegal in many countries if is sold for human consumption or under the several analogue acts

Pharmacokinetic data
- Onset of action: ≤15–20 minutes or a few hours
- Duration of action: 6–8 hours

Identifiers
- IUPAC name: (6aR,9R)-N,N-diethyl-7-prop-2-enyl-6,6a,8,9-tetrahydro-4H-indolo[4,3-fg]quinoline-9-carboxamide
- CAS Number: 65527-61-9
- PubChem CID: 15227511
- ChemSpider: 21106248
- UNII: 020O2SR91L
- ChEMBL: ChEMBL281787
- CompTox Dashboard (EPA): DTXSID30215822

Chemical and physical data
- Formula: C_{22}H_{27}N_{3}O
- Molar mass: 349.478 g·mol^{−1}
- 3D model (JSmol): Interactive image
- SMILES: [H][C@@]12Cc3c[nH]c4cccc(C1=C[C@@H](C(=O)N(CC)CC)CN2CC=C)c34
- InChI: InChI=1S/C22H27N3O/c1-4-10-25-14-16(22(26)24(5-2)6-3)11-18-17-8-7-9-19-21(17)15(13-23-19)12-20(18)25/h4,7-9,11,13,16,20,23H,1,5-6,10,12,14H2,2-3H3/t16-,20-/m1/s1; Key:JCQLEPDZFXGHHQ-OXQOHEQNSA-N

AL-LAD, or ALLAD, also known as ALLY-LAD or as 6-allyl-6-nor-LSD, is a psychedelic drug of the lysergamide family related to lysergic acid diethylamide (LSD). It is taken orally.

The drug interacts with serotonin and dopamine receptors and is known to act as an agonist of the serotonin 5-HT_{2A} receptor similarly to LSD. AL-LAD produces psychedelic-like effects in animals. It is closely structurally related to LSD and to other psychedelic lysergamides such as ETH-LAD and PRO-LAD.

AL-LAD was first described in the scientific literature by 1976. Subsequently, it was described by Alexander Shulgin in his 1997 book TiHKAL (Tryptamines i Have Known And Loved). AL-LAD was encountered as a novel designer recreational drug by 2015. The related drugs 1P-AL-LAD, 1cP-AL-LAD, and 1T-AL-LAD are thought to function as prodrugs of AL-LAD and have also been encountered as designer drugs in the 2020s.

== Use and effects ==
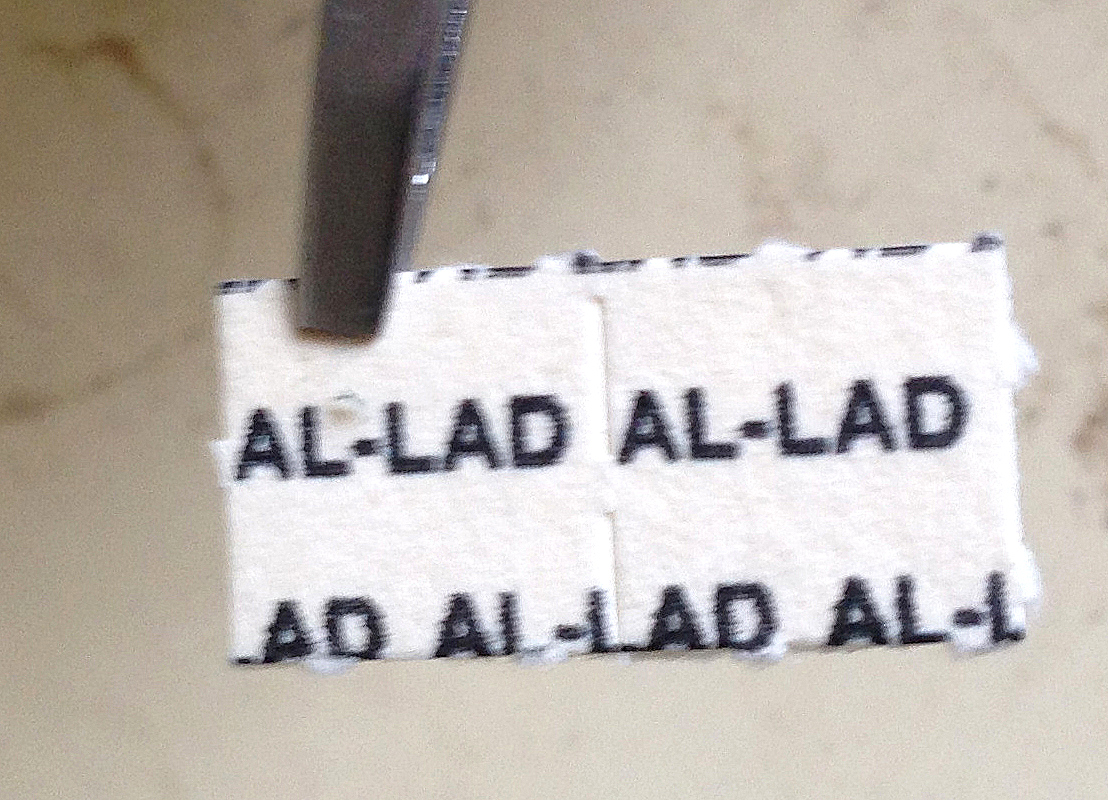
AL-LAD on blotter paper.

In his book TiHKAL (Tryptamines I Have Known and Loved), Alexander Shulgin describes the dose range of AL-LAD as 80 to 160 μg and its duration as 6 to 8 hours. In other publications however, Shulgin listed its dose range as 50 to 150 μg. A typical or moderate dose may be around 100 μg. The drug appears to be roughly equipotent with LSD, which has a listed dose range of 50 to 200 μg. AL-LAD's duration appears to be shorter than that of LSD, which is said to have a duration of 8 to 12 hours. The onset of AL-LAD has been reported to be within 15 to 20 minutes, but others reported a slower and more gradual onset building up over a few hours. It is also reported to have a very long "down-ramp" of effects.

AL-LAD has been described as producing similar effects to LSD and as being "really trippy" similarly, but as lacking the "vaguely sinister push" of LSD. In addition, it has been reported to have less visual distortion than LSD. The experience has been described as "simply beautiful". Its effects have been reported to include waves of intensification, no closed-eye visuals to superb mental imagery, mild visual distortion, open-eye visuals including floors melting and patterns on walls and ceilings flowing, some time dilation, separation from surrounding world, loss of contact with body, body feeling "blob-like", feeling stoned, music and erotic enhancement, clear thinking and good interpretation, mental and physical excitation, mood fluctuations, emotional lability, crying, opening up of repressed feelings, and in one case social distance and avoidance. Some individuals specifically reported no fear, panic, or body disturbance.

== Pharmacology ==
=== Pharmacodynamics ===
AL-LAD has been found to interact with the serotonin 5-HT_{1} and 5-HT_{2} receptors and with the dopamine D_{1} and D_{2} receptors. It is known to act as a potent full agonist of the serotonin 5-HT_{2A} receptor.

The drug was about 3.5-fold more potent than LSD in substituting for LSD in drug discrimination tests in rodents. Conversely however, AL-LAD was similar in potency to LSD in humans. AL-LAD produces the head-twitch response, a behavioral proxy of psychedelic-like effects, in rodents. It was slightly less potent than LSD in producing the head-twitch response in rodents.

=== Pharmacokinetics ===
The in-vitro metabolism of AL-LAD has been studied.

== Chemistry ==
AL-LAD, also known as 6-allyl-6-nor-LSD or as 6-allyl-6-nor-N,N-diethyllysergamide, is a synthetic substituted lysergamide and a 6-substituted derivative of nor-LSD (LAD).

=== Detection ===
AL-LAD does not cause a color change with the Marquis, Mecke or Mandelin reagents, but does cause the Ehrlich's reagent to turn purple because of the presence of the indole moiety in its structure.

=== Synthesis ===
The chemical synthesis of AL-LAD has been described. It is starting from nor-LSD as a precursor, using allyl bromide as a reactant.

=== Analogues ===
AL-LAD is closely related to other 6-substituted lysergamides such as LSD (METH-LAD), ETH-LAD, PRO-LAD, and MAL-LAD, among others. Ester prodrugs of AL-LAD include 1P-AL-LAD, 1cP-AL-LAD, and 1T-AL-LAD.

== History ==
AL-LAD was first described in the scientific literature by Tetsukichi Niwaguchi and colleagues in 1976. Subsequently, it was further studied by Andrew J. Hoffman and David E. Nichols in 1985. Alexander Shulgin described the effects of AL-LAD in humans in his 1997 book TiHKAL (Tryptamines I Have Known and Loved). The drug was encountered as a novel designer drug in Europe by 2015.

== Society and culture ==
=== Legal status ===
==== International ====
AL-LAD is not scheduled by the United Nations' Convention on Psychotropic Substances.

==== Canada ====
AL-LAD is not a controlled substance in Canada as of 2025.

==== Denmark ====
AL-LAD is illegal in Denmark.

==== Finland ====
Listed in a decree of the government's psychoactive substances banned from the consumer market.

==== France ====
AL-LAD is illegal in France.

==== Latvia ====
AL-LAD is possibly illegal in Latvia. Although it isn't specifically scheduled, it may be controlled as an LSD structural analogue due to an amendment made on June 1, 2015.

==== Sweden ====
The Riksdag added AL-LAD to Narcotic Drugs Punishments Act under Swedish schedule I ("substances, plant materials and fungi which normally do not have medical use" ) as of January 26, 2016, published by Medical Products Agency (MPA) in regulation HSLF-FS 2015:35 listed as 6-allyl-6-nor-LSD, AL-LAD, and 6-allyl-N,N-dietyl-9,10-didehydroergolin-8-karboxamid.

==== Switzerland ====
AL-LAD is illegal in Switzerland.

==== United Kingdom ====
AL-LAD is illegal in the UK. On June 10, 2014 the UK Advisory Council on the Misuse of Drugs (ACMD) recommended that AL-LAD be specifically named in the UK Misuse of Drugs Act as a class A drug despite not identifying any harm associated with its use. The UK Home office accepted this advice and announced a ban of the substance to be enacted on 6 January 2015 as part of The Misuse of Drugs Act 1971 (Amendment) (No. 2) Order 2014.

==== United States ====
AL-LAD is not an explicitly controlled substance in the United States. However, it could be considered a controlled substance under the Federal Analogue Act if intended for human consumption.

== See also ==
- Substituted lysergamide
- Lizard Labs
