= Chemical stability =

Thermodynamic equilibrium of a chemical system

In chemistry, chemical stability is the thermodynamic stability of a chemical system, in particular a chemical compound or a polymer. Colloquially, it may instead refer to kinetic persistence, the shelf-life of a metastable substance or system; that is, the timescale over which it begins to degrade.

Thermodynamic stability occurs when a system is in its lowest energy state, or in chemical equilibrium with its environment. This may be a dynamic equilibrium in which individual atoms or molecules change form, but their overall number in a particular form is conserved. This type of chemical thermodynamic equilibrium will persist indefinitely unless the system is changed. Chemical systems might undergo changes in the phase of matter or a set of chemical reactions.

State A is said to be more thermodynamically stable than state B if the Gibbs free energy of the change from A to B is positive.

== Versus reactivity ==
Thermodynamic stability applies to a particular system. The reactivity of a chemical substance is a description of how it might react across a variety of potential chemical systems and, for a given system, how fast such a reaction could proceed.

Chemical substances or states can persist indefinitely even though they are not in their lowest energy state if they experience metastability — a state which is stable only if not disturbed too much. A substance (or state) might also be termed "kinetically persistent" if it is changing relatively slowly (and thus is not at thermodynamic equilibrium, but is observed anyway). Metastable and kinetically persistent species or systems are not considered truly stable in chemistry. Therefore, the term chemically stable should not be used by chemists as a synonym of unreactive because it confuses thermodynamic and kinetic concepts. On the other hand, highly chemically unstable species tend to undergo exothermic unimolar decompositions at high rates. Thus, high chemical instability may sometimes parallel unimolar decompositions at high rates.

== Outside chemistry ==
In everyday language, and often in materials science, a chemical substance is said to be "stable" if it is not particularly reactive in the environment or during normal use, and retains its useful properties on the timescale of its expected usefulness. In particular, the usefulness is retained in the presence of air, moisture or heat, and under the expected conditions of application. In this meaning, the material is said to be unstable if it can corrode, decompose, polymerize, burn or explode under the conditions of anticipated use or normal environmental conditions.
