= 1P-ETH-LAD =

Chemical compound

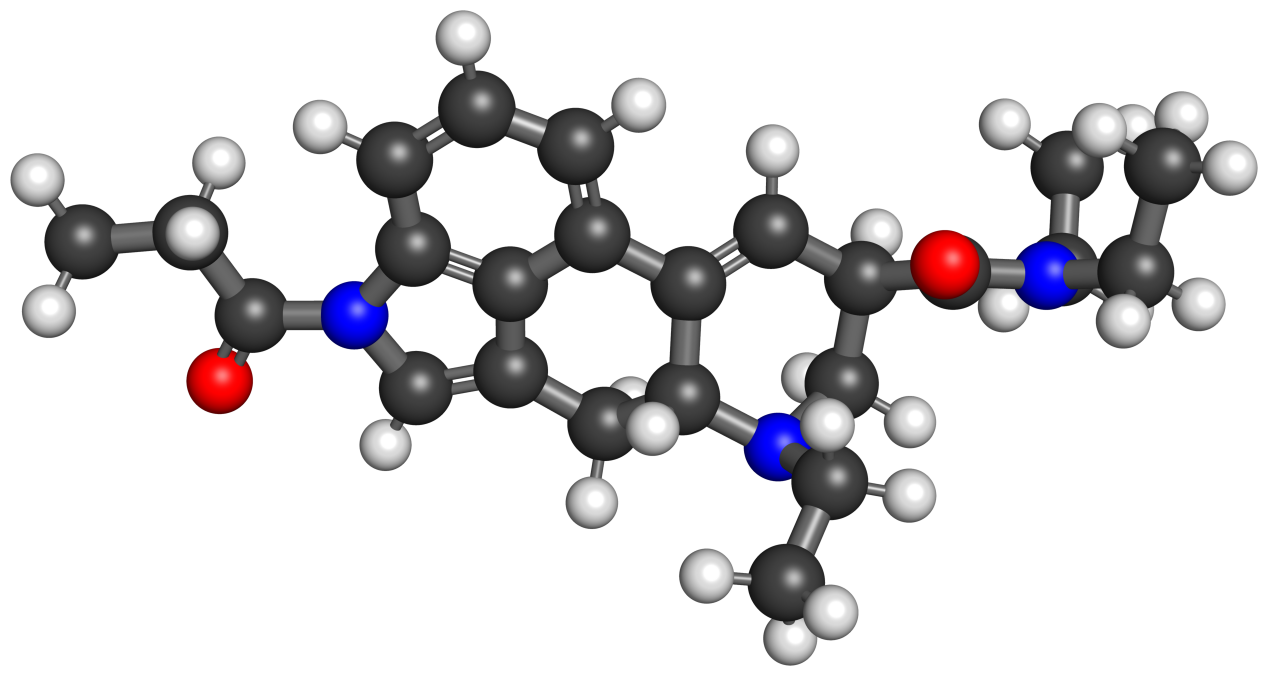

Clinical data
- Other names: 1-Propionyl-ETH-LAD; 1-Propionyl-6-ethyl-6-nor-LSD
- Routes of administration: Oral
- Drug class: Serotonergic psychedelic; Hallucinogen

Legal status
- Legal status: DE: NpSG (Industrial and scientific use only); UK: Under Psychoactive Substances Act; Illegal in France

Identifiers
- IUPAC name: (6aR,9R)-N,N-Diethyl-7-ethyl-4-propanoyl-6,6a,8,9-tetrahydroindolo[4,3-fg]quinoline-9-carboxamide
- CAS Number: 2230715-45-2
- PubChem CID: 119025859
- ChemSpider: 52085137
- UNII: HA76076A0R
- CompTox Dashboard (EPA): DTXSID301016300

Chemical and physical data
- Formula: C_{24}H_{31}N_{3}O_{2}
- Molar mass: 393.531 g·mol^{−1}
- 3D model (JSmol): Interactive image
- SMILES: CCC(=O)N1C=C2C[C@@H]3C(=C[C@H](CN3CC)C(=O)N(CC)CC)C4=C2C1=CC=C4
- InChI: InChI=1S/C24H31N3O2/c1-5-22(28)27-15-16-13-21-19(18-10-9-11-20(27)23(16)18)12-17(14-26(21)8-4)24(29)25(6-2)7-3/h9-12,15,17,21H,5-8,13-14H2,1-4H3/t17-,21-/m1/s1; Key:MLOFCBXSOAYCIF-DYESRHJHSA-N

1P-ETH-LAD, also known as 1-propionyl-6-ethyl-6-nor-LSD, is a psychedelic drug of the lysergamide family related to lysergic acid diethylamide (LSD). It is the 1-propionyl derivative of ETH-LAD and is thought to act as a prodrug of ETH-LAD analogously to how 1P-LSD acts as a prodrug of LSD.

== Use and effects ==
Like ETH-LAD, this drug has been reported to be significantly more potent than LSD itself, and is reported to largely mimic ETH-LAD's psychedelic effects.

== Pharmacology ==
Research has shown formation of ETH-LAD from 1P-ETH-LAD incubated in human serum, suggesting that it functions as a prodrug.

== Chemistry ==
=== Analogues ===
Analogues of 1P-ETH-LAD include 1P-LSD and 1P-AL-LAD, among others.

== History ==
1P-ETH-LAD has little history of human usage before January 2016.

== Society and culture ==
=== Legal status ===
==== Canada ====
1P-ETH-LAD is not a controlled substance in Canada as of 2025.

==== United Kingdom ====
It is illegal to produce, supply, or import 1P-ETH-LAD under the Psychoactive Substance Act, which came into effect on May 26, 2016.

==== United States ====
1P-ETH-LAD is not an explicitly controlled substance in the United States. However, it could be considered a controlled substance under the Federal Analogue Act if intended for human consumption.

== See also ==
- Substituted lysergamide
- Lizard Labs
