= PRO-LAD =

Chemical compound

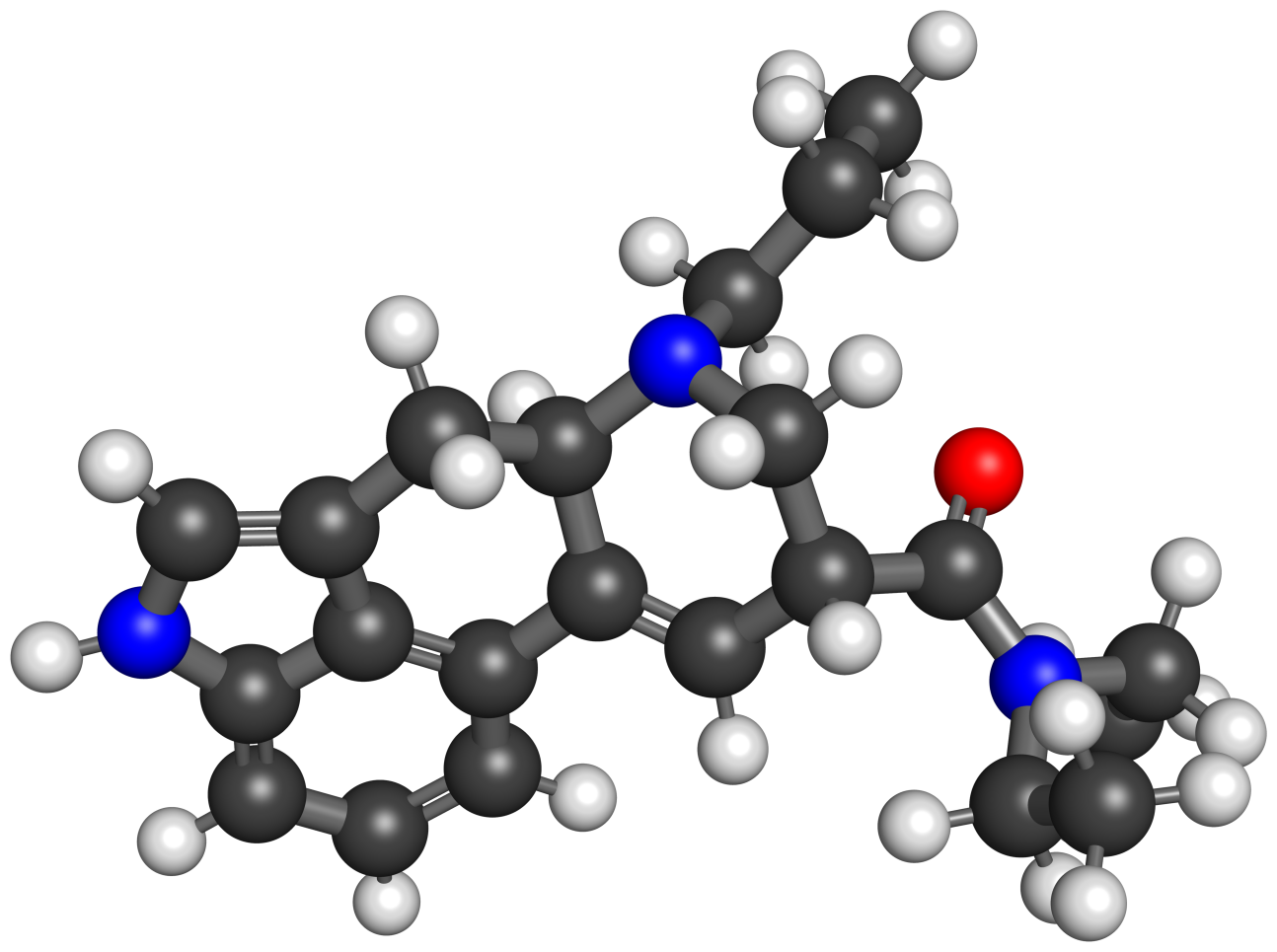

Clinical data
- Other names: PROLAD; 6-Propyl-6-nor-LSD; 6-Propyl-nor-LSD; 6-Propyl-6-norlysergic acid diethylamide; N,N-Diethyl-6-propyl-9,10-didehydroergoline-8β-carboxamide
- Routes of administration: Oral
- Drug class: Serotonin receptor modulator; Serotonin 5-HT_{2A} receptor agonist; Serotonergic psychedelic; Hallucinogen

Legal status
- Legal status: DE: NpSG (Industrial and scientific use only); UK: Under Psychoactive Substances Act; US: Analogue to a Schedule I/II drug but only if it is intended for human consumption; Illegal in France

Pharmacokinetic data
- Onset of action: ≤15 minutes
- Duration of action: 6–8 hours

Identifiers
- IUPAC name: (6aR,9R)-N,N-diethyl-7-propyl-6,6a,8,9-tetrahydro-4H-indolo[4,3-fg]quinoline-9-carboxamide
- CAS Number: 65527-63-1
- PubChem CID: 44457803
- ChemSpider: 21106361
- UNII: RVR83W9XMC
- ChEMBL: ChEMBL22258
- CompTox Dashboard (EPA): DTXSID50215824

Chemical and physical data
- Formula: C_{22}H_{29}N_{3}O
- Molar mass: 351.494 g·mol^{−1}
- 3D model (JSmol): Interactive image
- SMILES: CCN(CC)C(=O)[C@@H]2C=C1c3cccc4[nH]cc(C[C@H]1N(C2)CCC)c34
- InChI: InChI=1S/C22H29N3O/c1-4-10-25-14-16(22(26)24(5-2)6-3)11-18-17-8-7-9-19-21(17)15(13-23-19)12-20(18)25/h7-9,11,13,16,20,23H,4-6,10,12,14H2,1-3H3/t16-,20-/m1/s1; Key:HZKYLVLOBYNKKM-OXQOHEQNSA-N

PRO-LAD, or PROLAD, also known as 6-propyl-6-nor-LSD, is a psychedelic drug of the lysergamide family related to lysergic acid diethylamide (LSD). It is taken orally.

== Use and effects ==
According to Alexander Shulgin in his book TiHKAL (Tryptamines I Have Known and Loved) and other publications, PRO-LAD has a dose range of 100 to 200 μg or 80 to 175 μg orally and a duration of 6 to 8 hours. The onset is within 15 minutes. It has around the same potency as LSD, which has a listed dose range of 50 to 200 μg. On the other hand, PRO-LAD has a shorter duration than LSD, which has a listed duration of 8 to 12 hours.

The effects of PRO-LAD have been reported to include a lack of visuals and other psychedelic effects at lower doses, considerable visuals at higher doses, fantasy, synesthesia, clear thinking, lack of "cosmic-type" thinking, humor, pleasantness, dulled emotions, uncomfortableness, paranoia, and lightheadedness. It has been described as having relatively light or moderate effects. In addition, it is said to "not have any of the flavor of LSD", to be less visual than LSD, and to be "not up to LSD", if that is one's standard, as it is "basically not like LSD".

== Pharmacology ==
=== Pharmacodynamics ===
PRO-LAD shows affinity for serotonin receptors, including for the serotonin 5-HT_{1A}, 5-HT_{2A}, and 5-HT_{2C} receptors. It acts as a partial agonist of the serotonin 5-HT_{2A} receptor similarly to LSD.

The drug fully substitutes for LSD in rodent drug discrimination tests and with about the same or slightly greater potency than LSD itself. On the other hand, it was about 2- to 3-fold less potent than ETH-LAD or AL-LAD.

== Chemistry ==
=== Synthesis ===
The chemical synthesis of PRO-LAD has been described.

=== Analogues ===
Analogues of PRO-LAD include LSD, ETH-LAD, IP-LAD, AL-LAD, BU-LAD, MAL-LAD, PARGY-LAD, CYP-LAD, FLUORETH-LAD, and FP-LAD, among others.

== History ==
PRO-LAD was first described in the scientific literature by Tetsukichi Niwaguchi and colleagues in 1976. Subsequently, it was studied and described by Andrew J. Hoffman and David E. Nichols in 1985. The hallucinogenic effects of PRO-LAD in humans were first described by Nichols in a literature review via personal communication with Alexander Shulgin in 1986. The drug was later described in greater detail by Shulgin in his 1997 book TiHKAL (Tryptamines I Have Known and Loved). PRO-LAD is said to have been encountered as a novel designer drug by 2015.

== Society and culture ==
=== Legal status ===
==== Canada ====
PRO-LAD is not a controlled substance in Canada as of 2025.

==== Switzerland ====
PRO-LAD is illegal in Switzerland as of December 2015.

==== United Kingdom ====
On June 10, 2014, the United Kingdom Advisory Council on the Misuse of Drugs (ACMD) recommended that PRO-LAD be specifically named in the UK Misuse of Drugs Act as a class A drug despite not identifying it as ever having been sold or any harm associated with its use. The UK Home office accepted this advice and announced a ban of the substance to be enacted on 6 January 2015 as part of The Misuse of Drugs Act 1971 (Amendment) (No. 2) Order 2014.

==== United States ====
PRO-LAD is not an explicitly controlled substance in the United States. However, it could be considered a controlled substance under the Federal Analogue Act if intended for human consumption.

== See also ==
- Substituted lysergamide
