= Lizard Labs =

Chemical manufacturer and vendor, 2012–2024

- Founded: 2012
- Founder: Alexander Stratford ("Al")
- Defunct: December 31, 2024
- Headquarters: Maastricht, Netherlands
- Products: Research chemicals and designer drugs
- Website: lizardlabs.eu (2014–2022) lizardlabs.nl (2023–2024) synexsynthetics.nl

Lizard Labs, also known as Lizart Trading B.V. or Synex Synthetics B.V., was a well-known chemical producer and online vendor of legal psychoactive research chemicals that was based in Maastricht, Netherlands and operated from 2012 to 2024. During its period of activity, the company operated on a large scale and was among the key players in the legal designer drug industry.

== Operations ==
Lizard Labs's founder was a British chemist named Alexander Stratford who also went by the pseudonym "Al". The company developed and sold designer lysergamides, or LSD derivatives and prodrugs, such as 1V-LSD. They sold and shipped their compounds internationally, for instance to countries like Germany, France, and Japan.

The company played an ongoing "cat-and-mouse game" of developing and selling novel legal LSD prodrugs to circumvent drug laws. They initially developed the legal LSD prodrug 1P-LSD, which they released in 2012 or 2015 and was later banned. Subsequently, the company successively developed other legal LSD prodrugs including 1B-LSD, 1cP-LSD, 1V-LSD, 1D-LSD, and 1S-LSD, which were each introduced and then variably banned similarly. These 1-acyllysergamides were inspired by the much earlier LSD prodrug ALD-52 (1A-LSD) that had been developed and described by Albert Hofmann and colleagues at Sandoz in the 1950s. 1V-LSD and other LSD prodrugs are metabolically converted into LSD in the body and are said to be very similar or almost identical in their effects to actual LSD. However, according to Al, they can reportedly have differing durations from LSD, such as a shorter duration of 6 to 8 hours in the case of 1V-LSD.

Lizard Labs synthesized compounds such as 1V-LSD in-house, with the whole process in the case of 1V-LSD taking about 1 month. In a scene in a media feature, Al was shown holding a vial containing approximately 3 or 4 grams of 1V-LSD powder, which was said to be enough to dose "maybe a small country". The company described having to employ alternative chemical synthesis routes to avoid use of controlled precursors and intermediates. In addition to lysergamide prodrugs, they also synthesized and sold other psychedelic lysergamides like LSZ and various other legal psychoactive research chemicals besides lysergamides. The company obtained their raw materials from India and China.

The company's website stated that their chemicals were for research purposes only and not for human consumption. However, when interviewed in a media feature, in which he was described as the inventor of "legal LSD", Al said that he wished to make the LSD psychedelic experience more accessible, highlighting potential personal benefits and relatively low risks of the drug. As another basis for his company, he also cited the low and inconsistent quality of black-market LSD, which might or might not actually contain any LSD at all and was known to contain highly variable doses.

== History ==
Lizard Labs was founded by Alexander Stratford in 2012. It was interviewed by a French magazine in July 2022 and was covered in a short German documentary by Vice Media in August 2022. Journalist Hamilton Morris has also been interested in covering Lizard Labs and almost featured them in the third and final season of his Vice Media television show Hamilton's Pharmacopeia in 2021.

Soon after the mid-2022 media coverage, the company was raided by an international United States-led law enforcement operation in November 2022, with American authorities accusing them of manufacturing fentanyl. Electronic devices and equipment were confiscated, employees were detained and questioned, and the company's website was shut down. However, no substances were confiscated and no arrests were made. Subsequently, the company resumed operations and its website came back online by January 2023. Nonetheless, it later permanently shut down at the end of 2024 and the lab was sold. The reason cited for their closing was that continued operations in the Netherlands had become increasingly challenging. Subsequent to Lizard Labs's closing, other companies have filled its niche, including in Maastricht, Netherlands. In mid-2026, it was reported that Stratford was arrested in the United Kingdom and is facing possible extradition to the United States. He is accused of facilitating the importation of controlled substances into the United States and potentially faces life in prison.

Stratford and colleagues published numerous studies on psychedelic lysergamides in the 2010s and 2020s, for instance the "Return of the Lysergamides" series of papers on lysergamides and lysergamide prodrugs. The studies included analytical, preclinical, and clinical research on these lysergamides. The papers were coauthored with prominent psychedelic researchers, such as Jason Wallach, Adam Halberstadt, and David E. Nichols. Lizard Labs has also patented numerous lysergamide prodrugs.

== See also ==
- Online illicit drug vendor
- Substituted lysergamide
- List of psychedelic chemists
- William Leonard Pickard
