= Δ6-Cannabidiol =

Chemical compound

Δ^{6}-Cannabidiol
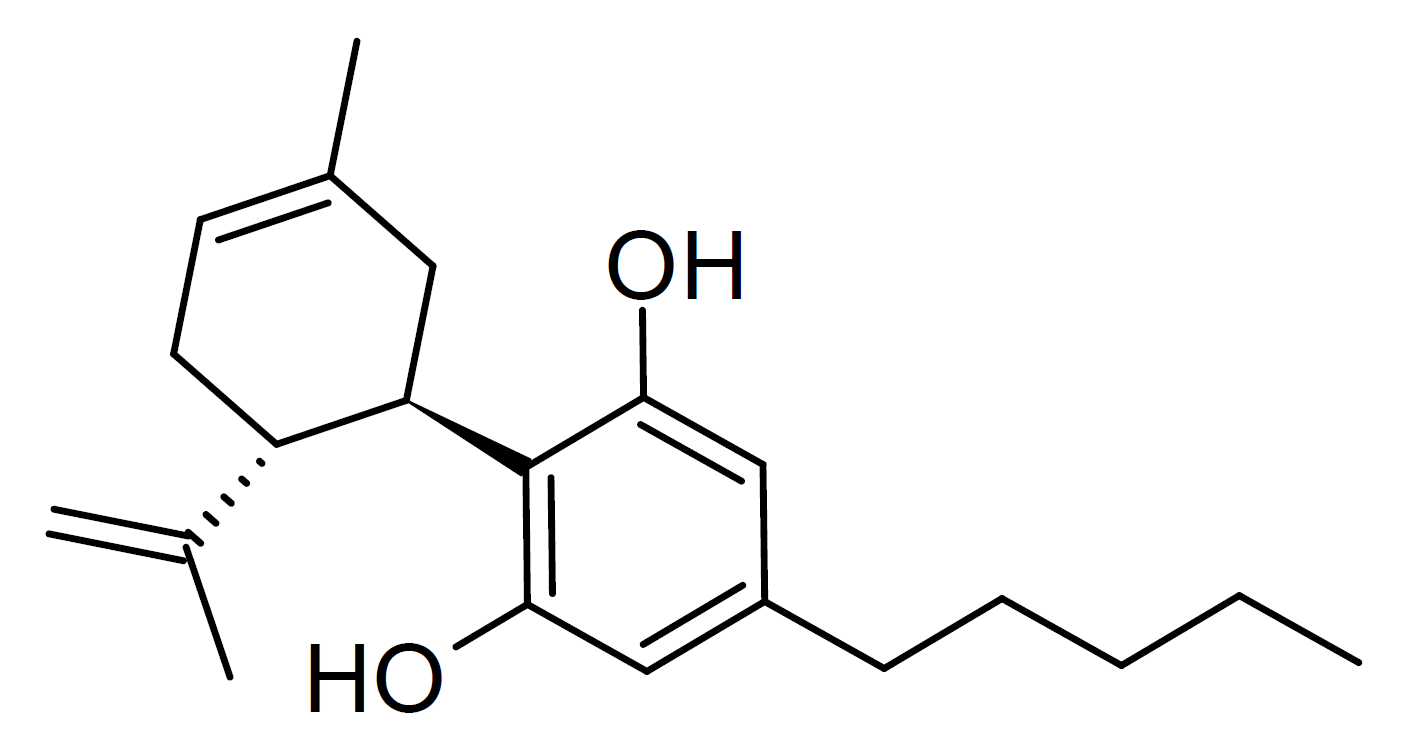

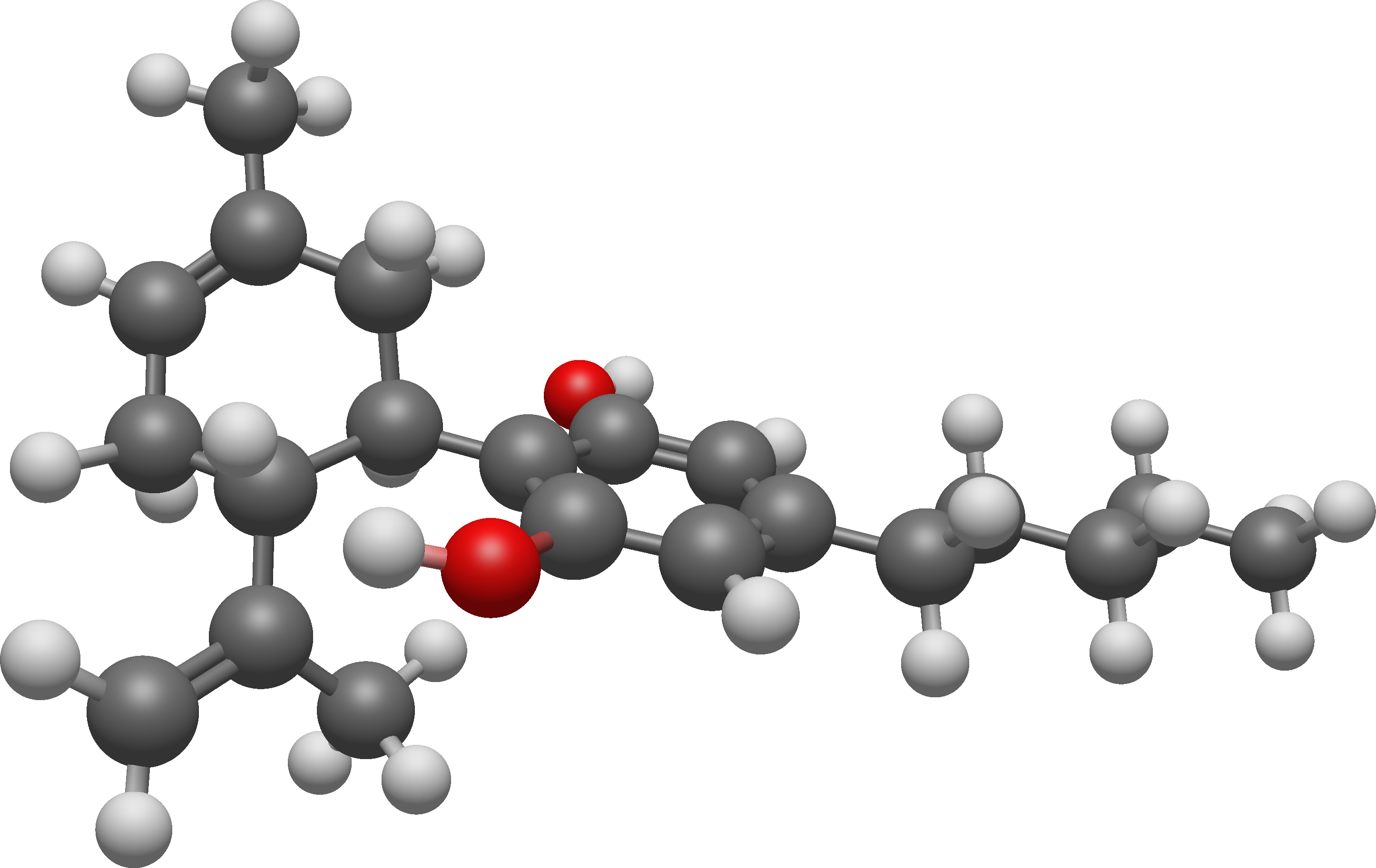

Identifiers
- IUPAC name: 2-[(1R,6R)-3-methyl-6-prop-1-en-2-ylcyclohex-3-en-1-yl]-5-pentylbenzene-1,3-diol
- CAS Number: 95588-88-8
- PubChem CID: 60209648
- ChemSpider: 24593618
- UNII: 59PB2GS7XS
- CompTox Dashboard (EPA): DTXSID901337112

Chemical and physical data
- Formula: C_{21}H_{30}O_{2}
- Molar mass: 314.469 g·mol^{−1}
- 3D model (JSmol): Interactive image
- SMILES: CCCCCC1=CC(=C(C(=C1)O)[C@@H]2CC(=CC[C@H]2C(=C)C)C)O
- InChI: InChI=1S/C21H30O2/c1-5-6-7-8-16-12-19(22)21(20(23)13-16)18-11-15(4)9-10-17(18)14(2)3/h9,12-13,17-18,22-23H,2,5-8,10-11H2,1,3-4H3/t17-,18+/m0/s1; Key:ZTGXAWYVTLUPDT-ZWKOTPCHSA-N

Δ^{6}-Cannabidiol (Delta-6-CBD, ∆^{6}-CBD, sometimes alternatively numbered as ∆^{3}-CBD) is a positional isomer of cannabidiol, found in only trace amounts in natural cannabis plants but readily synthesised from cannabidiol by base-catalysed migration of the double bond.

== See also ==
- 4'-Fluorocannabidiol
- 7-Hydroxycannabidiol
- 8,9-Dihydrocannabidiol
- Abnormal cannabidiol
- Cannabidiolic acid
- Cannabidiol dimethyl ether
- Cannabidiphorol
- Cannabigerol
- Cannabinodiol
- Cannabidivarin
- Cannabimovone
- Delta-8-THC
- Delta-10-THC
- H2-CBD
- H4-CBD
