= Etrinabdione =

Chemical compound

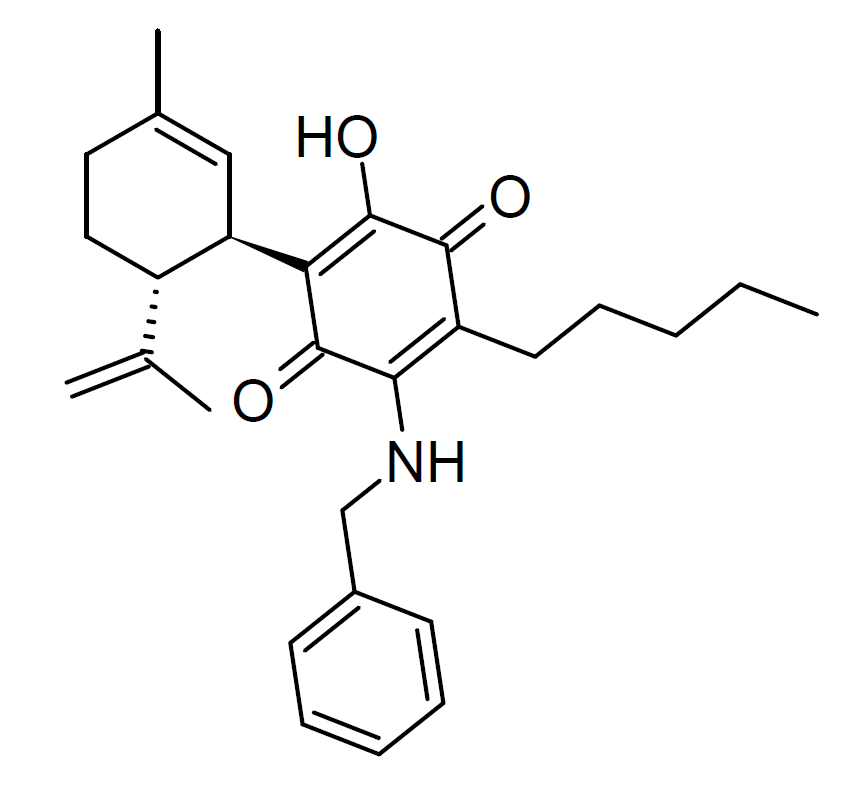

Identifiers
- IUPAC name: 5-(benzylamino)-4-hydroxy-3-[(1R,6R)-3-methyl-6-prop-1-en-2-ylcyclohex-2-en-1-yl]-6-pentylcyclohexa-3,5-diene-1,2-dione
- CAS Number: 1818428-24-8
- PubChem CID: 118465221
- DrugBank: DB18008
- ChemSpider: 129767891
- UNII: KTJCIKNF3F
- ChEMBL: ChEMBL5095098

Chemical and physical data
- Formula: C_{28}H_{35}NO_{3}
- Molar mass: 433.592 g·mol^{−1}
- 3D model (JSmol): Interactive image
- SMILES: CCCCCC1=C(C(=C(C(=O)C1=O)[C@@H]2C=C(CC[C@H]2C(=C)C)C)O)NCC3=CC=CC=C3
- InChI: InChI=1S/C28H35NO3/c1-5-6-8-13-22-25(29-17-20-11-9-7-10-12-20)27(31)24(28(32)26(22)30)23-16-19(4)14-15-21(23)18(2)3/h7,9-12,16,21,23,29,31H,2,5-6,8,13-15,17H2,1,3-4H3/t21-,23+/m0/s1; Key:CGGGAXJIRQSRPH-JTHBVZDNSA-N

Etrinabdione (VCE-004.8, EHP-101) is a drug structurally related to cannabidiol and HU-331 which has potent antiinflammatory and neuroprotective effects. It acts as a dual agonist of CB_{2} and PPARγ and is in clinical trials for the treatment of scleroderma.

== See also ==
- HU-331
- HU-336
- HUF-101
