= Cannabidiol diacetate =

Chemical compound

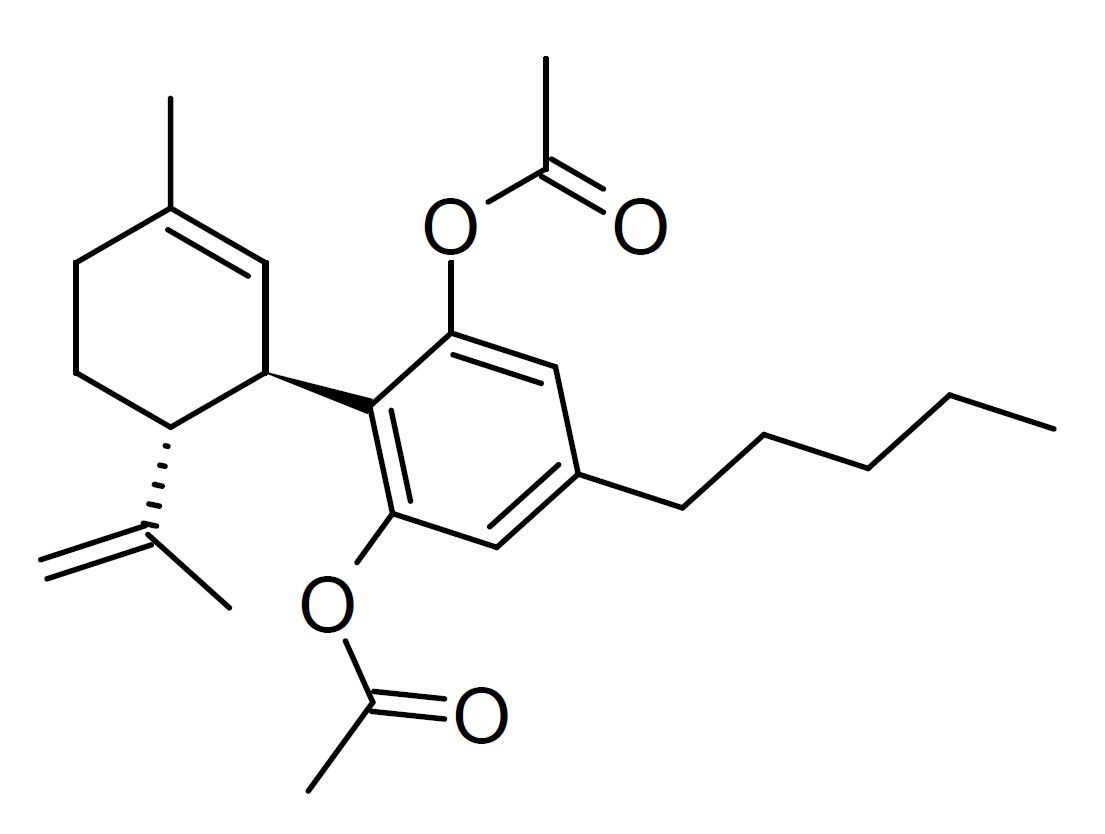

Identifiers
- IUPAC name: [3-acetyloxy-2-[(1R,6R)-3-methyl-6-prop-1-en-2-ylcyclohex-2-en-1-yl]-5-pentylphenyl] acetate
- CAS Number: 40525-15-3
- PubChem CID: 15139512
- ChemSpider: 24721420
- ChEMBL: ChEMBL525251

Chemical and physical data
- Formula: C_{25}H_{34}O_{4}
- Molar mass: 398.543 g·mol^{−1}
- 3D model (JSmol): Interactive image
- SMILES: CCCCCC1=CC(=C(C(=C1)OC(=O)C)[C@@H]2C=C(CC[C@H]2C(=C)C)C)OC(=O)C
- InChI: InChI=1S/C25H34O4/c1-7-8-9-10-20-14-23(28-18(5)26)25(24(15-20)29-19(6)27)22-13-17(4)11-12-21(22)16(2)3/h13-15,21-22H,2,7-12H2,1,3-6H3/t21-,22+/m0/s1; Key:UCYSPYOYJNVCAI-FCHUYYIVSA-N

Cannabidiol diacetate (CBD-di-O-Acetate, CBD-DO) is a semi-synthetic derivative of cannabidiol derived by acetylation of the OH groups, which presumably acts as a prodrug for CBD. It has been found as a component of grey-market cannabis products such as e-cigarette liquids and cannabis infused foods.

== See also ==
- 4'-Fluorocannabidiol
- 7-Hydroxycannabidiol
- 8,9-Dihydrocannabidiol
- Cannabidiol dimethyl ether
- Delta-6-Cannabidiol
- H4-CBD
- KLS-13019
- THC-O-acetate
