= CBD-DMH =

Chemical compound with cannabinoid effects

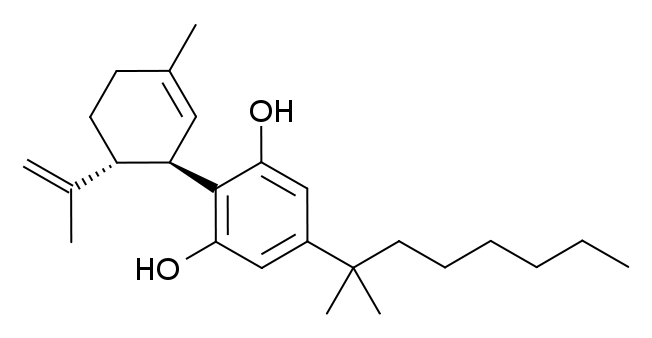

Identifiers
- IUPAC name: 5-(1,1-Dimethylheptyl)-2-[(1R,6R)-3-methyl-6-(1-methylethenyl)-2-cyclohexen-1-yl]-1,3-benzenediol
- CAS Number: 97452-63-6 (−)-enantiomer
- PubChem CID: 126670
- ChemSpider: 112525
- UNII: P28FSD6QS7
- CompTox Dashboard (EPA): DTXSID10913915

Chemical and physical data
- Formula: C_{25}H_{38}O_{2}
- Molar mass: 370.577 g·mol^{−1}
- 3D model (JSmol): Interactive image
- SMILES: CCCCCCC(C)(C)c1cc(c(c(c1)O)[C@@H]2C=C(CC[C@H]2C(=C)C)C)O
- InChI: InChI=1S/C25H38O2/c1-7-8-9-10-13-25(5,6)19-15-22(26)24(23(27)16-19)21-14-18(4)11-12-20(21)17(2)3/h14-16,20-21,26-27H,2,7-13H2,1,3-6H3/t20-,21+/m0/s1; Key:MPJURNPNPDQYSY-LEWJYISDSA-N

Cannabidiol-dimethylheptyl (CBD-DMH or DMH-CBD) is a synthetic homologue of cannabidiol where the pentyl chain has been replaced by a dimethylheptyl chain. Several isomers of this compound are known. The most commonly used isomer in research is (−)-CBD-DMH, which has the same stereochemistry as natural cannabidiol, and a 1,1-dimethylheptyl side chain. This compound is not psychoactive and acts primarily as an anandamide reuptake inhibitor, but is more potent than cannabidiol as an anticonvulsant and has around the same potency as an antiinflammatory. Unexpectedly the “unnatural” enantiomer (+)-CBD-DMH, which has reversed stereochemistry from cannabidiol, was found to be a directly acting cannabinoid receptor agonist with a K_{i} of 17.4nM at CB_{1} and 211nM at CB_{2}, and produces typical cannabinoid effects in animal studies, as does its 7-OH derivative.

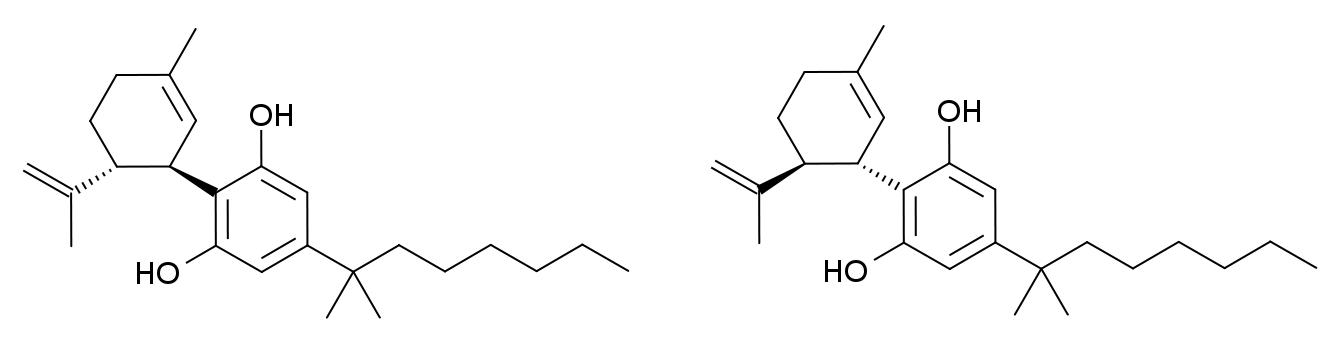
(−)-CBD-DMH (left) and (+)-CBD-DMH (right)

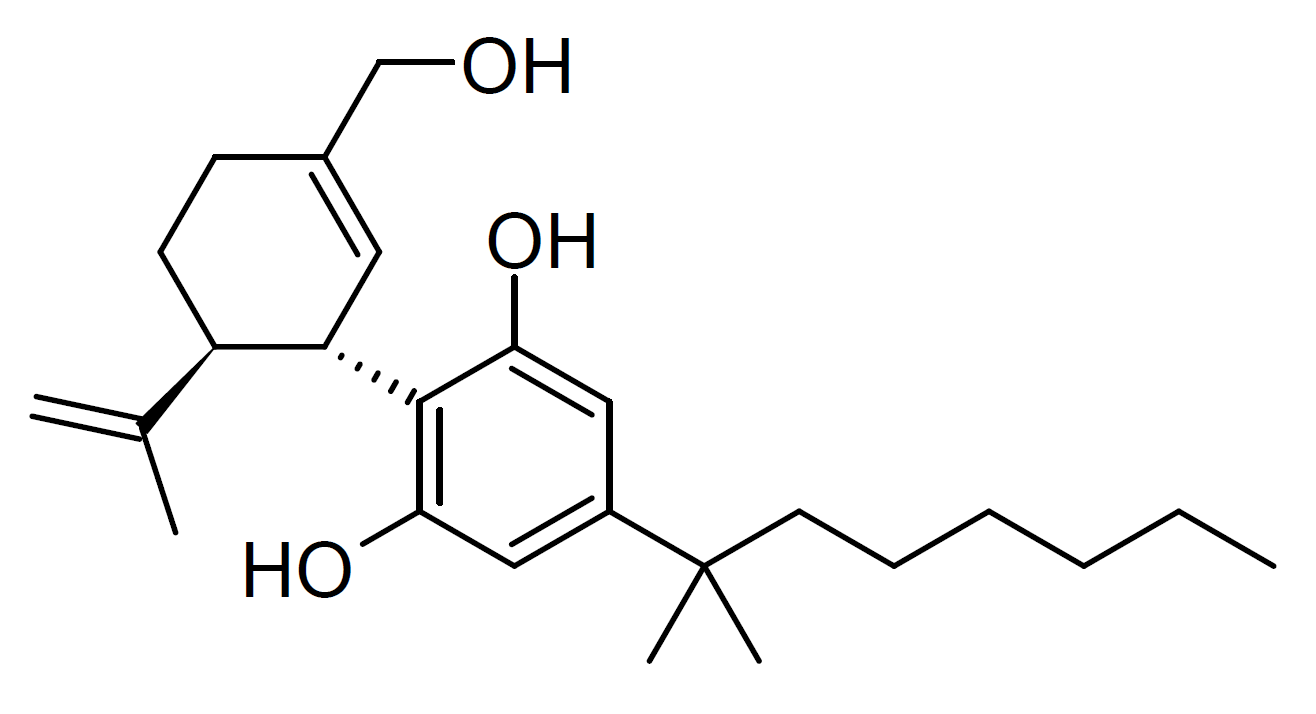
7-OH-(+)-CBD-DMH

Another closely analogous compound has also been described, with the double bond in the cyclohexene ring shifted to between the 1,6-positions rather than the 2,3-positions (i.e. analogous to synthetic THC analogues such as parahexyl), the isopropenyl group saturated to isopropyl, and a 1,2-dimethylheptyl side chain. It is synthesized by Birch reduction from the 1,2-dimethylheptyl analogue of cannabidiol. This compound also produces potent cannabinoid-like effects in animals, but has three chiral centers and is composed of a mixture of eight stereoisomers, which have not been studied individually, so it is not known which stereoisomers are active.

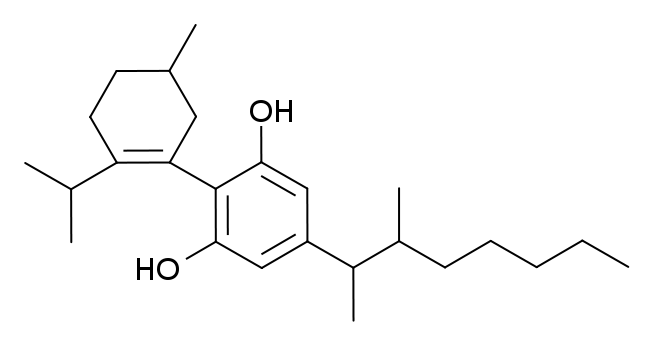
1,2-CBD-DMH

== See also ==
- Δ8-THC-DMH
- 7-OH-CBD
- Abnormal cannabidiol
- Cannabinoid receptors
- Cannabidiphorol
- Cis-THC
- HU-211
- HUF-101
- KLS-13019
- O-1656
- O-1871
- O-1918
- Nabilone
- Tetrahydrocannabiphorol
- NESS-040C5
