= Cannabisol =

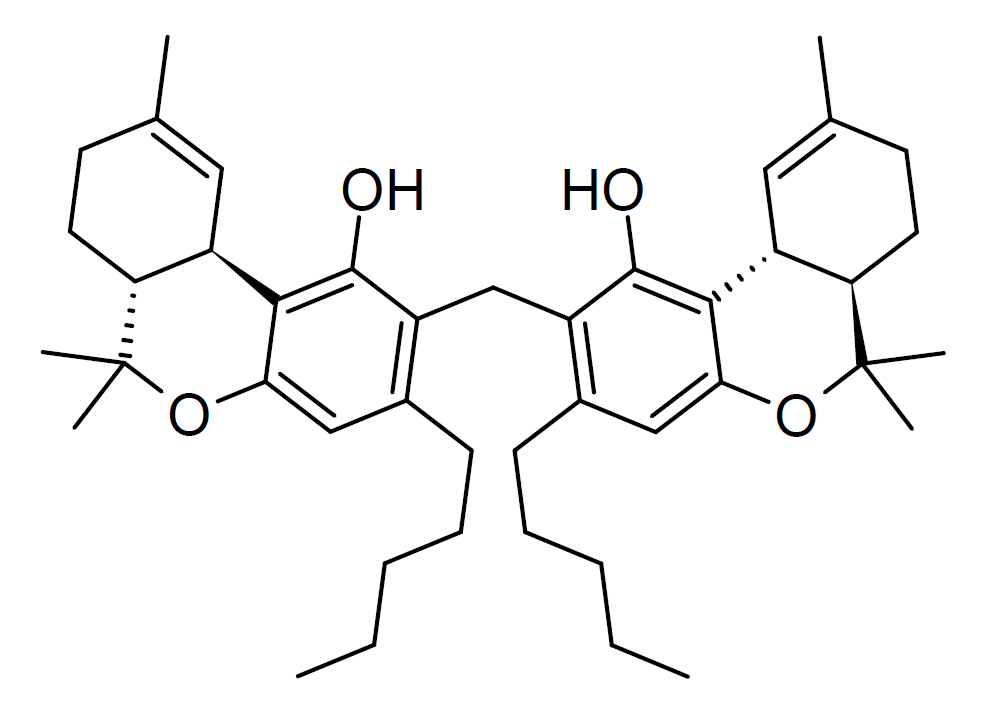

Identifiers
- IUPAC name: (6aR,10aR)-2-[[(6aR,10aR)-1-hydroxy-6,6,9-trimethyl-3-pentyl-6a,7,8,10a-tetrahydrobenzo[c]chromen-2-yl]methyl]-6,6,9-trimethyl-3-pentyl-6a,7,8,10a-tetrahydrobenzo[c]chromen-1-ol
- CAS Number: 1384106-31-3
- PubChem CID: 102487751
- UNII: XQY3V2EC6H
- CompTox Dashboard (EPA): DTXSID701107446

Chemical and physical data
- Formula: C_{43}H_{60}O_{4}
- Molar mass: 640.949 g·mol^{−1}
- 3D model (JSmol): Interactive image
- SMILES: CCCCCC1=CC2=C([C@@H]3C=C(CC[C@H]3C(O2)(C)C)C)C(=C1CC4=C(C5=C(C=C4CCCCC)OC([C@H]6[C@H]5C=C(CC6)C)(C)C)O)O
- InChI: InChI=1S/C43H60O4/c1-9-11-13-15-28-23-36-38(32-21-26(3)17-19-34(32)42(5,6)46-36)40(44)30(28)25-31-29(16-14-12-10-2)24-37-39(41(31)45)33-22-27(4)18-20-35(33)43(7,8)47-37/h21-24,32-35,44-45H,9-20,25H2,1-8H3/t32-,33-,34-,35-/m1/s1; Key:PDADLCKRVIFEGH-BAQBVXSRSA-N

Cannabisol is a phytocannabinoid first isolated from Cannabis sativa in 2012, which is a dimer of THC found in trace amounts in cannabis plant material. Its bioactivity has not yet been studied, but similar dimeric forms of cannabidiol (known as cannabitwinol) and cannabigerol (known as cannabizetol) have also been reported more recently, and found to have TRP channel modulatory and antiinflammatory actions respectively.

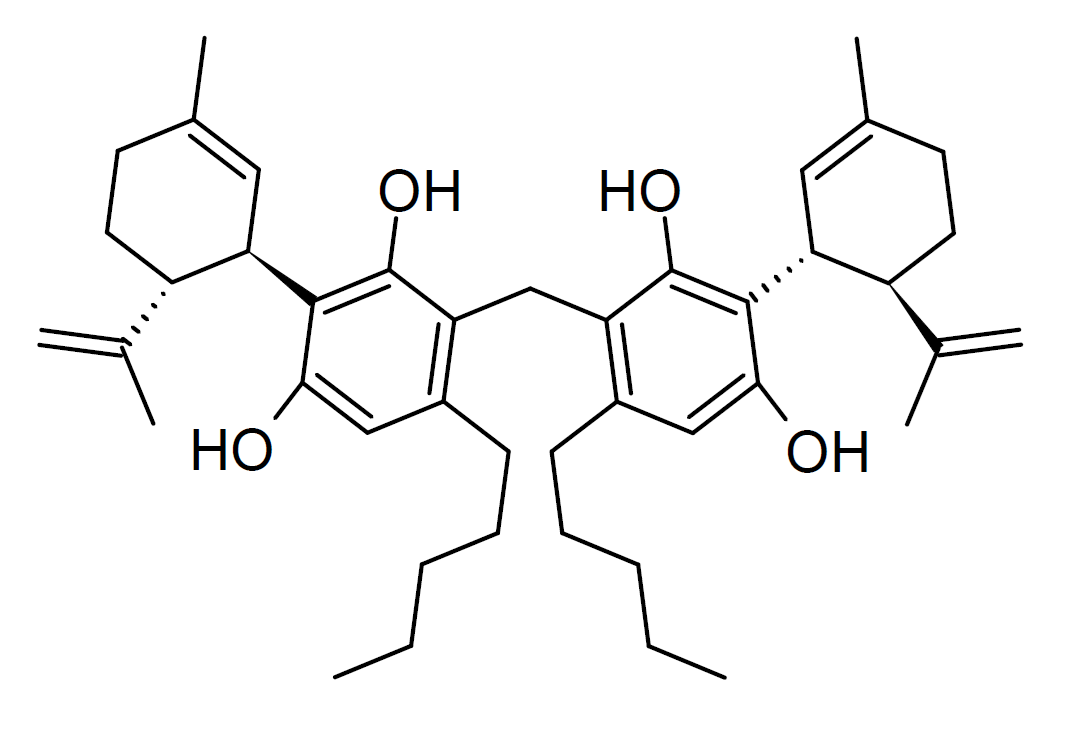
Cannabitwinol, PMID:162659880

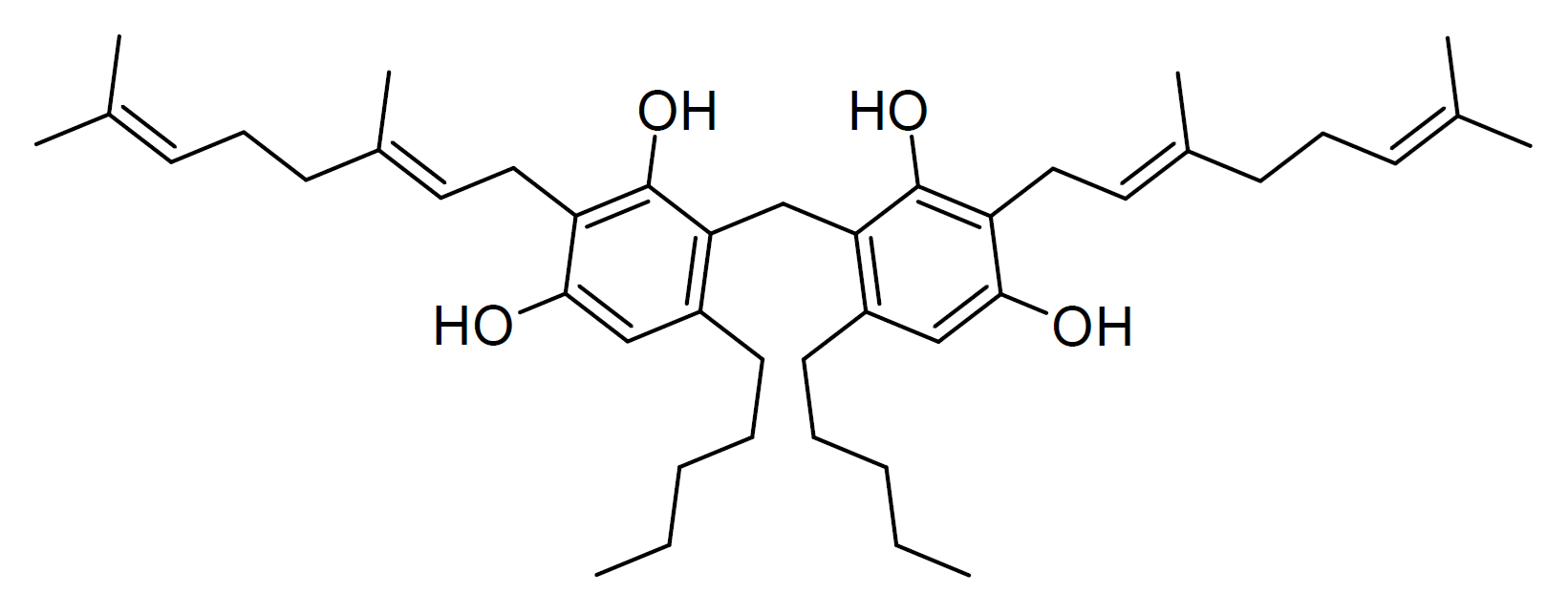
Cannabizetol

== See also ==
- Cannabichromene
- Cannabicitran
- Cannabicyclol
- Cannabielsoin
- Cannabimovone
- Cannabinodiol
- Cannabitriol
