= Alec Todd =

British biochemist (1907–1997)

The Right Honourable The Lord Todd OM FRS FRSE
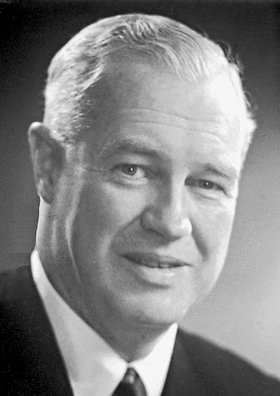
- Alexander Todd in 1957
- Born: Alexander Robertus Todd; 2 October 1907; Cathcart, Scotland
- Died: 10 January 1997 (aged 89); Oakington, England
- Education: University of Glasgow; University of Frankfurt am Main; Oriel College, Oxford
- Awards: Tilden Prize (1940); Davy Medal (1949); Royal Medal (1955); Nobel Prize for Chemistry (1957); Paul Karrer Gold Medal (1963); Copley Medal (1970); Lomonosov Gold Medal (1978)
- Scientific career
- Fields: Chemistry, Biochemistry
- Workplaces: Lister Institute; University of Edinburgh; University of London; University of Manchester; University of Cambridge; University of Strathclyde; Hatfield Polytechnic
- Doctoral advisor: Prof. Dr. Walther Borsche, Sir Robert Robinson
- Doctoral students: J. Rodney Quayle

Alexander Robertus Todd, Baron Todd (2 October 1907 – 10 January 1997) was a British biochemist whose research on the structure and synthesis of nucleotides, nucleosides, and nucleotide coenzymes gained him the Nobel Prize for Chemistry in 1957.

== Early life and education ==
Todd was born at Cathcart in outer Glasgow, the elder son of Alexander Todd, JP, a clerk with the Glasgow Subway, and his wife, Jane Lowry.

He attended Allan Glen's School and graduated from the University of Glasgow with a bachelor's degree (BSc) in 1928. He received a doctorate (Dr Phil.nat.) from Goethe University Frankfurt in 1931 for his thesis on the chemistry of the bile acids.

Todd was awarded an 1851 Research Fellowship from the Royal Commission for the Exhibition of 1851, and, after studying at Oriel College, Oxford, he received another doctorate (DPhil) in 1933.

== Career ==
Todd held posts with the Lister Institute, the University of Edinburgh (staff, 1934–1936) and the University of London, where he was appointed Reader in biochemistry.

In 1938, Alexander Todd spent six months as a visiting professor at California Institute of Technology, eventually declining an offer of faculty position.

Todd became the Sir Samuel Hall Chair of Chemistry and director of the Chemical Laboratories of the University of Manchester in 1938, where he began working on nucleosides, compounds that form the structural units of nucleic acids (DNA and RNA). At 31, he was the youngest professor of chemistry since Frankland. He was elected to membership of the Manchester Literary and Philosophical Society in 1938.

In 1944, he was appointed to the 1702 Chair of Chemistry in the University of Cambridge, which he held until his retirement in 1971. In 1949, he synthesised adenosine triphosphate (ATP) and flavin adenine dinucleotide (FAD). Todd served as a visiting professor at the University of Chicago in Autumn 1948 and University of Sydney in 1950.

By 1951, Todd and collaborators at Cambridge had determined by biochemical methods how the backbone of DNA is structured via the successive linking of carbon atoms 3 and 5 of the sugar to phosphates. This helped corroborate Francis Crick and James_Watson's X-ray structural work published in 1953.

In 1955, he helped elucidate the structure of vitamin B_{12}, although the final formula and definite structure was determined by Dorothy Hodgkin and her team, and later worked on the structure and synthesis of vitamin B_{1} and vitamin E, the anthocyanins (the pigments of flowers and fruits) from insects (aphids, beetles) and studied alkaloids found in cannabis. He served as chairman of the Government of the United Kingdom's advisory committee on scientific policy from 1952 to 1964.

He is credited as the first person to synthesize H4-CBD and H2-CBD from Cannabidiol by hydrogenation as early as 1940.

He received the 1957 Nobel Prize in Chemistry "for his work on nucleotides and nucleotide co-enzymes."

Elected a Fellow of Christ's College, Cambridge in 1944, he served as Master from 1963 to 1978. Lord Todd became the first Chancellor of the new University of Strathclyde in 1965, and a visiting professor at Hatfield Polytechnic (1978–1986). Among his many honours, including over 40 honorary degrees, he was elected a Fellow of the Royal Society in 1942, a member of the United States National Academy of Sciences in 1955, a member of the American Academy of Arts and Sciences in 1957, and the American Philosophical Society in 1965. President of the Royal Society from 1975 to 1980, The Queen awarded him the Order of Merit in 1977.

In 1981, Todd became a founding member of the World Cultural Council.

== Personal life and death ==
In 1937, Todd married Alison Sarah Dale (d. 1987), daughter of Nobel Prize winner Henry Hallett Dale, who like Todd, served as President of the Royal Society of London. They had a son and two daughters:

- Dr the Hon Alexander Henry Todd (b. 1939), educated at Oriel College, Oxford, Master Salters' Company (1999/2000), m. 1stly 1967 (div 1981) Joan Margaret Koester, m. 2ndly Patricia Mary Harvey Jones, daughter of Brigadier Alan Harvey Jones CBE TD, of Somerford Booths, Cheshire;
- The Hon Helen Jean Todd (b. 1941), m. 1963 Philip Edgar Brown, and has two sons and a daughter;
- The Hon Hilary Alison Todd (b. 1946).

Todd died in Cambridge on 10 January 1997 at the age of 89 following a heart attack.

== Honours ==
Todd was honoured as a Nieuwland Lecturer at the University of Notre Dame in 1948, an Arthur D. Little Visiting Professor at Massachusetts Institute of Technology in 1954, and a Hitchcock Lecturer at University of California, Berkeley, in 1957.

Knighted as Sir Alexander Todd in 1954 he was elevated as a Life Peer on 16 April 1962, being created Baron Todd of Trumpington in the County of Cambridge.

Lord Todd, Master of the Worshipful Company of Salters (1961/62) and then Master of Christ's College (1963–78), is commemorated by a blue plaque erected by the Royal Society of Chemistry at the Department of Chemistry in the University of Cambridge.

Coat of arms of Alec Todd

Coronet
Coronet of a Baron
Crest
In front of an Open Book Proper bound Or a Fox passant guardant Gules.
Escutcheon
Gules a Chevron between in chief two Foxes' Masks and in base a Serpent embowed biting the tail Or.
Supporters
Dexter an Ounce and Sinister a Fox each Sable bezanty and gorged with a Ducal Coronet with Chain reflexed over the back Or pendant from the Coronet by a like chain an Escutcheon Blue celeste.
Motto
Faire Sans Dire
Orders
Suspended below the Shield by its ribbon, the insignia of the Order of Merit:
Other elements
As Master Salter and then as Master of Christ's College, Cambridge, Lord Todd impaled his arms of office (dexter) with his family arms (sinister):
,

== Bibliography ==
- Todd, Alexander (3 December 2009). A Time to Remember. Cambridge University Press. ISBN 978-0-521-12673-1.

== See also ==
- Atherton–Todd reaction
- History of RNA biology
- List of RNA biologists
- Presidents of the Royal Society

Academic offices
Preceded by Sir William Pope	Professor; Organic Chemistry, Cambridge; 1944–1972	Succeeded by Ralph Raphael
Preceded by Brian Downs	32nd Master; Christ's College, Cambridge; 1963–1978	Succeeded by Sir John Plumb
Professional and academic associations
Preceded by Sir Alan Lloyd Hodgkin	54th President of the Royal Society; 1975–1980	Succeeded by Sir Andrew Huxley
Civic offices
Preceded by	Master; Worshipful Company of Salters; 1961/62	Succeeded by
