= Onternabez =

Cannabidiol-derivative drug

Clinical data
- Other names: HU-308, HU308, PPP-003, ARDS-003
- Drug class: CB_{2} receptor agonist
- ATC code: None

Legal status
- Legal status: CA: Schedule II; UK: Class B; US: Unscheduled; Florida: Schedule I

Pharmacokinetic data
- Metabolism: Liver
- Excretion: Kidneys

Identifiers
- IUPAC name: [(1S,2S,5S)-2-[2,6-Dimethoxy-4-(2-methyloctan-2-yl)phenyl]-7,7-dimethyl-4-bicyclo[3.1.1]hept-3-enyl]methanol
- CAS Number: 256934-39-1
- PubChem CID: 11553430
- ChemSpider: 8020425
- UNII: 8I5L034D55
- KEGG: D12305
- ChEBI: CHEBI:146244
- CompTox Dashboard (EPA): DTXSID801017327

Chemical and physical data
- Formula: C_{27}H_{42}O_{3}
- Molar mass: 414.630 g·mol^{−1}
- 3D model (JSmol): Interactive image
- SMILES: CCCCCCC(C)(C)C1=CC(=C(C(=C1)OC)[C@H]2C=C([C@@H]3C[C@H]2C3(C)C)CO)OC
- InChI: InChI=1S/C27H42O3/c1-8-9-10-11-12-26(2,3)19-14-23(29-6)25(24(15-19)30-7)20-13-18(17-28)21-16-22(20)27(21,4)5/h13-15,20-22,28H,8-12,16-17H2,1-7H3/t20-,21-,22+/m0/s1; Key:CFMRIVODIXTERW-FDFHNCONSA-N

Onternabez (also known as HU-308, HU308, PPP-003, and ARDS-003) is a synthetic cannabinoid that acts as a potent cannabinoid agonist. It is highly selective for the cannabinoid-2 receptor (CB_{2} receptor) subtype, with a selectivity more than 5,000 times greater for the CB_{2} receptor than the CB_{1} receptor. The synthesis and characterization of onternabez took place in the laboratory of Raphael Mechoulam at the Hebrew University of Jerusalem (the HU in HU-308) in the late 1990s. The pinene dimethoxy-DMH-CBD derivative onternabez was identified as a potent peripheral CB_{2}-selective agonist in in vitro and animal studies in 1990 and 1999.

== Legal status ==
Onternabez is non-psychoactive and not scheduled at the federal level in the United States. It is a Schedule I controlled substance in the state of Florida making it illegal to buy, sell, or possess there.

== See also ==
- Cannabidiol dimethyl ether
- Cannabidiol diacetate
- HU-210
- HU-320
- HU-211
- Nabilone
- CP 47,497
