= C21H26O2 =

The molecular formula C_{21}H_{26}O_{2} (molar mass : 310.42 g/mol, exact mass : 310.19328) may refer to:

- Altrenogest
- Cannabinol
- Cannabinodiol
- Gestodene, a progesterone contraceptive hormone
- Mestranol
- Plomestane
