= C23H34O2 =

The molecular formula C_{23}H_{34}O_{2} (molar mass: 342.51 g/mol, exact mass: 342.2559 u) may refer to:

- Cannabidiol dimethyl ether
- Cardenolide
- Tetrahydrocannabiphorol
