= H4-CBD =

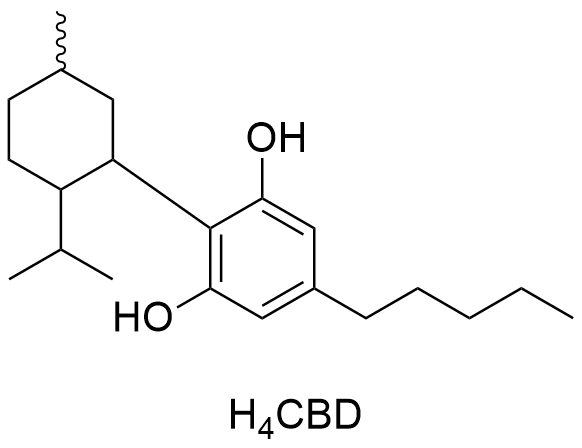

Names
- IUPAC name 2-(2-Isopropyl-5-methylcyclohexyl)-5-pentylbenzene-1,3-diol
- Other names: Hydrogenated CBD; HCBD; Tetrahydrocannabidiol; Cyclohexyl-CBD

Identifiers
CAS Number	4460-20-2
3D model (JSmol)	Interactive image
ChemSpider	535647
PubChem CID	616324
CompTox Dashboard (EPA)	DTXSID00346910
- InChI: InChI=1S/C21H34O2/c1-5-6-7-8-16-12-19(22)21(20(23)13-16)18-11-15(4)9-10-17(18)14(2)3/h12-15,17-18,22-23H,5-11H2,1-4H3 Key: LXIXAVCVBZBXIY-UHFFFAOYSA-N
- SMILES: Oc1c(c(O)cc(c1)CCCCC)C2\CC(/CCC2\C(C)C)C

Properties
Chemical formula	C_{21}H_{34}O_{2}
Molar mass	318.501 g·mol^{−1}

Related compounds
Related compounds	H2-CBD
- Except where otherwise noted, data are given for materials in their standard state (at 25 °C [77 °F], 100 kPa). Infobox references

H4CBD (hydrogenated CBD, tetrahydrocannabidiol) is a synthetic cannabinoid that was first synthesized by Alexander R. Todd in 1940 derived from the catalytic hydrogenation of cannabidiol.

H2-CBD and 8,9-dihydrocannabidiol have also been referred to as "hydrogenated CBD", which may cause confusion.

== Pharmacology ==
In 2006, it was discovered that H4CBD has a binding affinity of 145 nM at the CB1 receptor and potential anti-inflammatory effects independent of its cannabinoid receptor action. In contrast, CBD has been found to bind to the CB1 receptor as an inverse agonist/antagonist with a K_{i} ranging from 3.3 to 4.8 mM.

== Elucidation ==
In 2023 H_{4}CBD epimers were elucidated using NOESY and COSY NMR spectroscopic techniques, while the inclusion of LC-MS and SCFC were used to isolate individual diasteromers.

== See also ==
- H2-CBD (also hydrogenated CBD)
- 8,9-Dihydrocannabidiol (one of the two components in H2CBD)
- Hexahydrocannabinol (hydrogenated THC)
- 4'-Fluorocannabidiol
- 7-Hydroxycannabidiol
- Abnormal cannabidiol
- Cannabidiol dimethyl ether
- Delta-6-cannabidiol
