= C25H36O4 =

The molecular formula C_{25}H_{36}O_{4} (molar mass: 400.55 g/mol, exact mass: 400.2614 u) may refer to:

- Ajulemic acid
- HU-320, or 7-nor-7-carboxy-CBD-1,1-DMH
