= KLS-13019 =

Chemical compound

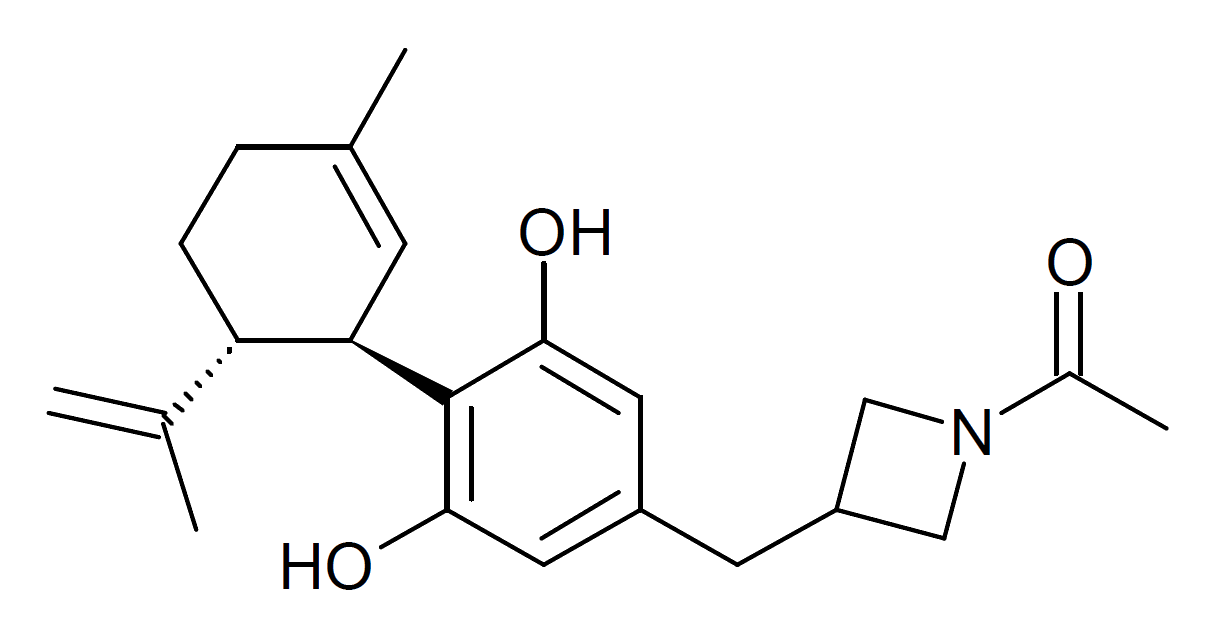

Identifiers
- IUPAC name: 1-[3-[[3,5-dihydroxy-4-[(1R,6R)-3-methyl-6-prop-1-en-2-ylcyclohex-2-en-1-yl]phenyl]methyl]azetidin-1-yl]ethanone
- CAS Number: 1801243-39-9
- PubChem CID: 91824155
- ChemSpider: 58922500
- ChEMBL: ChEMBL3809216

Chemical and physical data
- Formula: C_{22}H_{29}NO_{3}
- Molar mass: 355.478 g·mol^{−1}
- 3D model (JSmol): Interactive image
- SMILES: CCCCCC1=CC(=C(C(=C1F)O)[C@@H]2C=C(CC[C@H]2C(=C)C)C)O
- InChI: InChI=1S/C22H29NO3/c1-13(2)18-6-5-14(3)7-19(18)22-20(25)9-16(10-21(22)26)8-17-11-23(12-17)15(4)24/h7,9-10,17-19,25-26H,1,5-6,8,11-12H2,2-4H3/t18-,19+/m0/s1; Key:VWVIOABMCXYUAS-RBUKOAKNSA-N

KLS-13019 is a cannabidiol derivative that has been modified on the side chain to improve solubility and tissue penetration properties. It was developed and patented by Neuropathix subsidiary Kannalife and found to be 50x more potent than cannabidiol as a neuroprotective agent, thought to be mediated by modulation of the mitochondrial sodium-calcium exchanger and GPR55. It also had a higher therapeutic index than cannabidiol. Both KLS-13019 and cannabidiol, prevented the development of CIPN, while only KLS-13019 uniquely reversed neuropathic pain from chemotherapy. KLS-13019 binds to fewer biological targets than cannabidiol and KLS-13019 may possess the unique ability to reverse addictive behaviour, an effect not observed with cannabidiol. Recent studies have also demonstrated that KLS-13019 influences neuroinflammatory responses in primary neuronal cultures, an effect that is dependent on the fatty acyl composition of lysophosphatidylinositol. This suggests an interaction between KLS-13019 and lipid signaling pathways, potentially involving GPR55, a receptor implicated in neuroinflammatory modulation.

== See also ==
- GPR55
- NLRP3
- NCX1
- Mitochondrial disease
- G protein-coupled receptor
- 7-Hydroxycannabidiol
- Abnormal cannabidiol
- Cannabidiol dimethyl ether
- Delta-6-Cannabidiol
- HU-320
- HU-331
- HUF-101
- O-1602
- O-1918
