= HU-345 =

Chemical compound

Identifiers
- IUPAC name: 6,6,9-Trimethyl-3-pentyl-1H-benzo[c]chromene-1,4(6H)-dione
- CAS Number: 731773-46-9
- PubChem CID: 11198119
- ChemSpider: 9373188
- ChEMBL: ChEMBL127671
- CompTox Dashboard (EPA): DTXSID101029797

Chemical and physical data
- Formula: C_{21}H_{24}O_{3}
- Molar mass: 324.420 g·mol^{−1}
- 3D model (JSmol): Interactive image
- SMILES: O=C2\C(=C/C(=O)C=3c1c(ccc(c1)C)C(OC2=3)(C)C)CCCCC
- InChI: InChI=1S/C21H24O3/c1-5-6-7-8-14-12-17(22)18-15-11-13(2)9-10-16(15)21(3,4)24-20(18)19(14)23/h9-12H,5-8H2,1-4H3; Key:UFDYTRQMIXJHTH-UHFFFAOYSA-N

HU-345 (Cannabinolquinone, CBNQ) is a drug that is able to inhibit aortic ring angiogenesis more potently than the parent compound cannabinol (CBN). It exhibits no psychoactive effects.

HU-345 is made via the oxidation of CBN or THC.

== See also ==
- HU-331
- HU-336
