= Cannabimovone =

Chemical compound

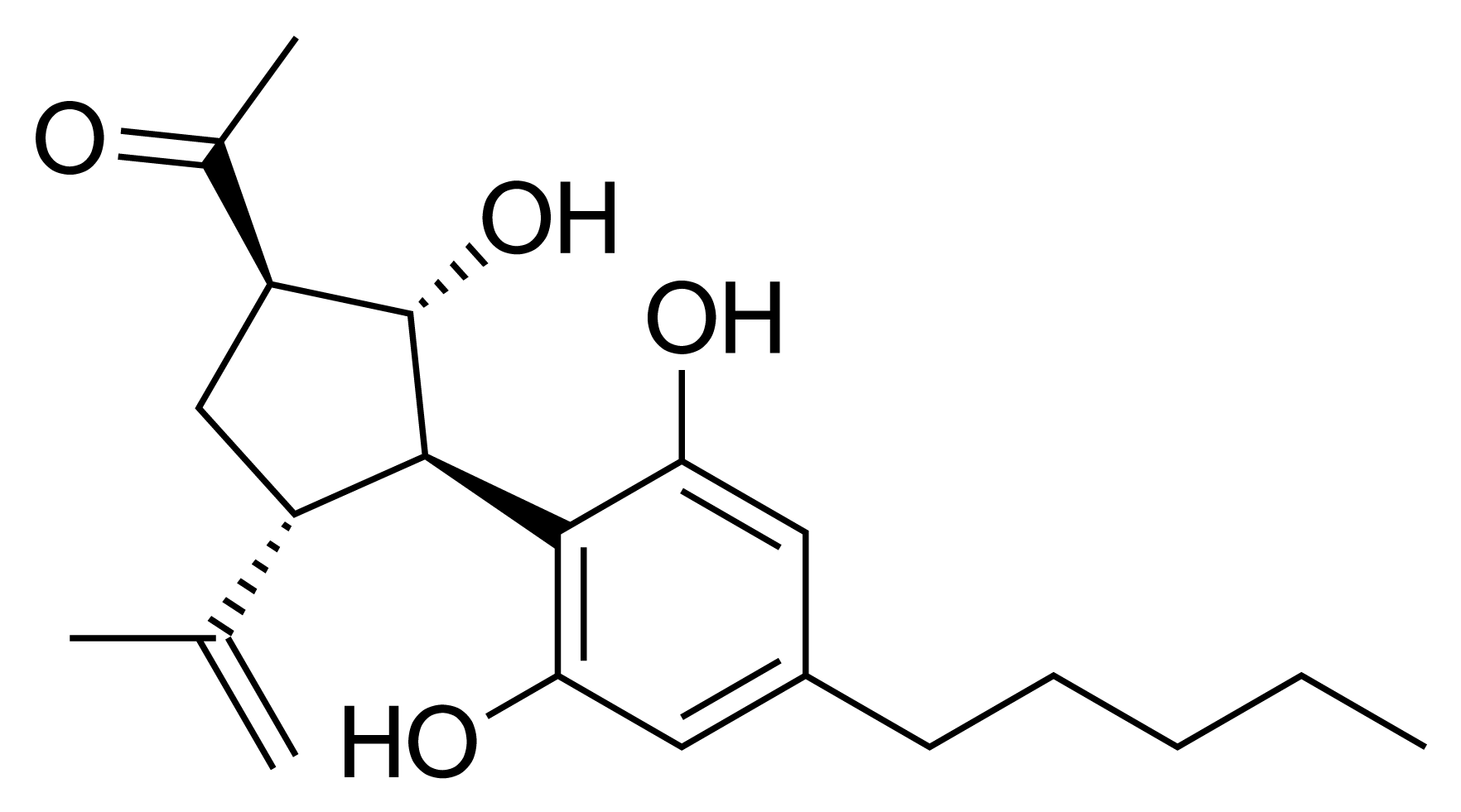

Identifiers
- IUPAC name: 1-[(1R,2R,3S,4R)-3-(2,6-dihydroxy-4-pentylphenyl)-2-hydroxy-4-prop-1-en-2-ylcyclopentyl]ethanone
- CAS Number: 1227939-59-4
- PubChem CID: 134955841
- ChemSpider: 75573942
- CompTox Dashboard (EPA): DTXSID401337105

Chemical and physical data
- Formula: C_{21}H_{30}O_{4}
- Molar mass: 346.467 g·mol^{−1}
- 3D model (JSmol): Interactive image
- SMILES: CCCCCC1=CC(=C(C(=C1)O)[C@@H]2[C@@H](C[C@H]([C@@H]2O)C(=O)C)C(=C)C)O
- InChI: InChI=1S/C21H30O4/c1-5-6-7-8-14-9-17(23)20(18(24)10-14)19-15(12(2)3)11-16(13(4)22)21(19)25/h9-10,15-16,19,21,23-25H,2,5-8,11H2,1,3-4H3/t15-,16-,19-,21-/m0/s1; Key:YNKVBFQBHSCXGQ-UGJIMAENSA-N

Cannabimovone (CBM) is a phytocannabinoid first isolated from a non-psychoactive strain of Cannabis sativa in 2010, which is thought to be a rearrangement product of cannabidiol. It lacks affinity for cannabinoid receptors, but acts as an agonist at both TRPV1 and PPARγ.

== See also ==
- Cannabichromene
- Cannabicitran
- Cannabicyclol
- Cannabielsoin
- Cannabigerol
- Cannabinodiol
- Cannabisol
- Cannabitriol
- Delta-6-CBD
