= CBD cigarette =

Cigarette made with hemp containing CBD

A CBD cigarette is a cigarette made with hemp instead of purely tobacco, containing cannabidiol (CBD) but a negligible amount of psychoactive tetrahydrocannabinol (THC). The effects typically last between 2–3 hours and can take anywhere from seconds to several minutes to set in, making it one of the fastest methods to feel the effects of cannabidiol. Human pharmacokinetic data on cannabidiol is limited but available studies show peak blood concentrations are reached more quickly after smoking or inhalation than when taken orally.

Unlike traditional tobacco cigarettes, CBD cigarettes are non-addictive as they contain no nicotine, though users should be aware that combustion of any plant material produces tar and other potentially harmful byproducts.

As of 2022, CBD cigarettes will be at the Swiss supermarket chain Coop. Swiss law allows the sale of products containing less than 1% THC, contrasted with laws elsewhere in Europe limiting THC to 0.2%.

US law and regulation following the 2018 Farm Bill allows the sale of hemp products containing less than 0.3% THC on a dry weight, pre-decarboxylation basis. Products marketed in the United States as "hemp" must comply with other applicable laws as well. The Food and Drug Administration (FDA) notes that whether CBD products may be lawfully sold depends on intended use and labelling, and it states that it is prohibited in interstate commerce to sell food to which THC or CBD has been added. Many vendors are positioning CBD cigarettes as an alternative to tobacco cigarettes, which contain physically addictive nicotine. Most, or nearly all, CBD cigarettes do not contain tobacco—instead they are usually made with hemp flowers (Cannabis sativa Linn) which possess low amounts of CBD and the main psychoactive part of cannabis, tetrahydrocannabinol, commonly known as THC. These cigarettes are often produced by famous CBD cigarette brands worldwide, such as Wild Hemp, Pure Hempsmokes, Mota Island, The Trost etc. Like traditional tobacco cigarettes there is a risk of dependence and the public-health agencies has noted that some CBD cigarette users develop cannabis use disorder. A laboratory study of commercial hemp cigarettes reported that mainstream smoke contained multiple carbonyl compounds (including formaldehyde, acetaldehyde, acetone, and acrolein) and concluded that hemp-cigarette smoke contains biologically significant concentrations of carbonyls. Combustion-generated smoke from cannabis material can share physical and chemical similarities with tobacco smoke. A 2020 study reported that marijuana smoke particles contained more total mass than tobacco smoke particles and contained many compounds known to cause negative health effects. Public-health guidance noted that secondhand cannabis smoke contains many of the same toxic and cancer-causing chemicals found in tobacco smoke, and research has examined cannabis smoking as a source of indoor air pollutants with potential secondhand and thirdhand exposure concerns. Recent Developments in the CBD Cigarette Industry (2025) As of 2025, the CBD cigarette industry has experienced significant growth and innovation, driven by evolving consumer preferences and advancements in product offerings. The global market for CBD cigarettes is projected to reach USD 979.9 billion by 2032, reflecting a compound annual growth rate (CAGR) of 22.8% from 2024. Key trends shaping the industry include:

== Product innovation ==
Manufacturers are introducing a variety of CBD cigarette products, including flavored options, terpene-infused blends, and strain-specific pre-rolls, catering to diverse consumer preferences.

== Sustainability initiatives ==
There is a growing emphasis on eco-friendly practices, such as using biodegradable packaging and promoting regenerative farming methods, in response to consumer demand for sustainable products.

== Regulatory developments ==
The industry is navigating a complex regulatory landscape, with varying laws across regions affecting product formulations and marketing strategies.
