= HU-336 =

Chemical compound

Identifiers
- IUPAC name: (6aR,10aR)-6,6,9-Trimethyl-3-pentyl-6a,7,10,10a-tetrahydro-1H-benzo[c]chromene-1,4(6H)-dione
- CAS Number: 19542-59-7
- PubChem CID: 11370880
- ChemSpider: 9545797
- UNII: UT665EY7F2
- CompTox Dashboard (EPA): DTXSID401029796

Chemical and physical data
- Formula: C_{21}H_{28}O_{3}
- Molar mass: 328.452 g·mol^{−1}
- 3D model (JSmol): Interactive image
- SMILES: O=C\2C=1OC([C@H]3[C@H](C=1C(=O)/C=C/2CCCCC)C/C(=C\C3)C)(C)C
- InChI: InChI=1S/C21H28O3/c1-5-6-7-8-14-12-17(22)18-15-11-13(2)9-10-16(15)21(3,4)24-20(18)19(14)23/h9,12,15-16H,5-8,10-11H2,1-4H3/t15-,16-/m1/s1; Key:GOZGLSHDDOJPJS-HZPDHXFCSA-N

HU-336 is a strongly antiangiogenic compound, significantly inhibiting angiogenesis at concentrations as low as 300 nM. It inhibits angiogenesis by directly inducing apoptosis of vascular endothelial cells without changing the expression of pro- and antiangiogenic cytokines and their receptors. HU-336 is highly effective against tumor xenografts in nude mice. Although it is the oxidized (quinone) form of delta-8 THC, it is entirely non psychoactive.

== See also ==
- HU-331
- HU-345
