= 8,9-Dihydrocannabidiol =

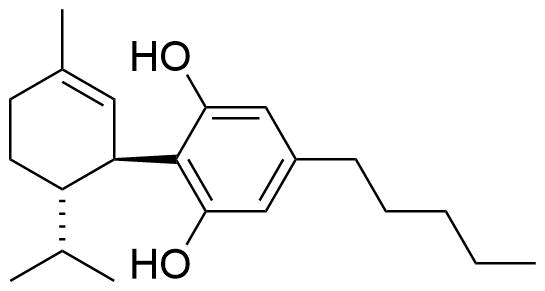

Names
- Preferred IUPAC name 2-[(1S,6S)-3-Methyl-6-(propan-2-yl)cyclohex-2-en-1-yl]-5-pentylbenzene-1,3-diol
- Other names H2CBD, DiHydroCBD

Identifiers
CAS Number	23050-49-9
3D model (JSmol)	Interactive image
ChemSpider	9891398
PubChem CID	11716677
UNII	K2X8KX5UDK
CompTox Dashboard (EPA)	DTXSID501132586
- InChI: InChI=1S/C21H32O2/c1-5-6-7-8-16-12-19(22)21(20(23)13-16)18-11-15(4)9-10-17(18)14(2)3/h11-14,17-18,22-23H,5-10H2,1-4H3/t17-,18+/m0/s1 Key: PCXRACLQFPRCBB-ZWKOTPCHSA-N
- SMILES: CCCCCC1=CC(=C(C(=C1)O)[C@@H]2C=C(CC[C@H]2C(C)C)C)O

Properties
Chemical formula	C_{21}H_{32}O_{2}
Molar mass	316.485 g·mol^{−1}
- Except where otherwise noted, data are given for materials in their standard state (at 25 °C [77 °F], 100 kPa). Infobox references

8,9-Dihydrocannabidiol (also known as H2CBD, DiHydroCBD, Delta-1-H2CBD, or Delta-1-DiHydroCBD) is a synthetic cannabinoid that is closely related to cannabidiol (CBD) itself. that was first synthesized by Alexander R. Todd in 1940 derived from the catalytic hydrogenation of cannabidiol.

== Pharmacology ==
It may have certain advantages over CBD, in that it is fully synthetic, inexpensive to produce, and it is not a scheduled drug (cannabis extracts are controlled substances in most parts of the world). In addition, there is no path to synthesize the psychoactive substance tetrahydrocannabinol (THC) from H2CBD. CBD has been shown to convert to some extent to THC in the gastric tract, and the deliberate laboratory conversion of CBD to THC is straightforward. H2CBD has therefore been studied for its potential use as an alternative to CBD in terms of its lack of abuse liability and absence of psychotropic effects.

It was shown to have anti-seizure activity essentially identical to that of CBD in tests with rats.

In 2006 it was reported that 8,9-Dihydrocannabidiol binds very weakly to the CB1 receptor with a binding affinity higher than 1μM but was noted to have potential anti-inflammatory effects independent of its cannabinoid receptor action.

== See also ==
- H2-CBD (refers to 2 chemicals known as H2CBD)
- H4-CBD (also hydrogenated CBD)
- Hexahydrocannabinol (hydrogenated THC)
- 4'-Fluorocannabidiol
- 7-Hydroxycannabidiol
- 7,8-Dihydrocannabinol
- Abnormal cannabidiol
- Cannabidiol dimethyl ether
- Delta-6-cannabidiol
