= HU-320 =

Chemical compound

Identifiers
- IUPAC name: (3S,4S)-3-[2,6-Dihydroxy-4-(2-methyloctan-2-yl)phenyl]-4-(prop-1-en-2-yl)cyclohex-1-ene-1-carboxylic acid
- CAS Number: 380495-76-1
- PubChem CID: 11223325
- ChemSpider: 9398378
- CompTox Dashboard (EPA): DTXSID001029794

Chemical and physical data
- Formula: C_{25}H_{36}O_{4}
- Molar mass: 400.559 g·mol^{−1}
- 3D model (JSmol): Interactive image
- SMILES: O=C(O)/C2=C/[C@H](c1c(O)cc(cc1O)C(C)(C)CCCCCC)[C@@H](\C(=C)C)CC2
- InChI: InChI=1S/C25H36O4/c1-6-7-8-9-12-25(4,5)18-14-21(26)23(22(27)15-18)20-13-17(24(28)29)10-11-19(20)16(2)3/h13-15,19-20,26-27H,2,6-12H2,1,3-5H3,(H,28,29)/t19-,20+/m1/s1; Key:LDMILSDGSQMZOB-UXHICEINSA-N

HU-320 (7-nor-7-carboxy-CBD-1,1-DMH) is a drug related to cannabidiol, which has strong antiinflammatory and immunosuppressive properties while demonstrating no psychoactive effects.

== See also ==
- 7-Hydroxycannabidiol
- Ajulemic acid
- HU-210
- HU-308
- HU-331
