= Cannabinodiol =

Chemical compound

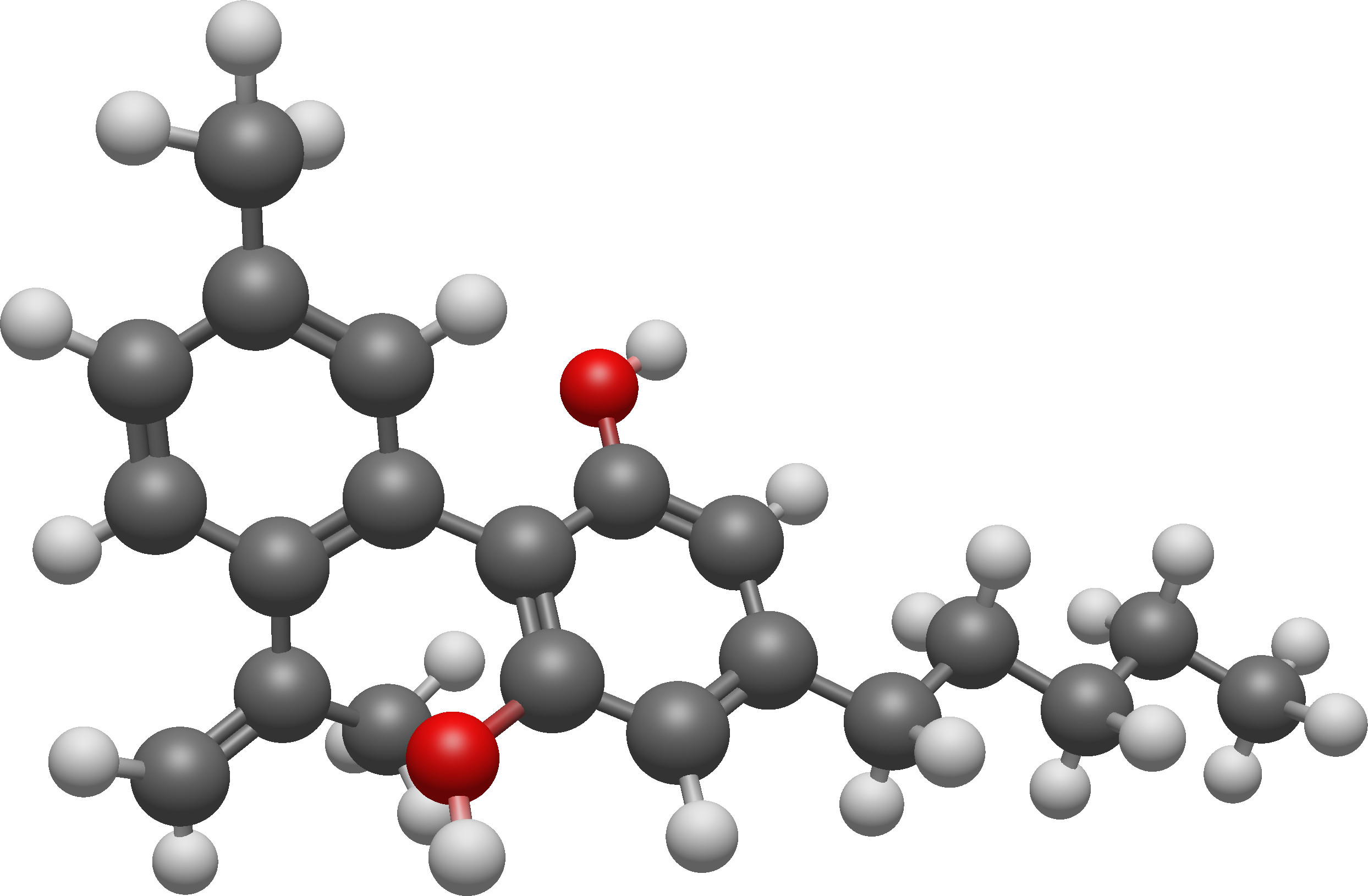

Clinical data
- ATC code: None

Legal status
- Legal status: CA: Schedule II; UK: Under Psychoactive Substances Act

Identifiers
- IUPAC name: 5'-Methyl-4-pentyl-2'-(prop-1-en-2-yl)-[1,1'-biphenyl]-2,6-diol
- CAS Number: 39624-81-2
- PubChem CID: 11551346
- ChemSpider: 9726124
- UNII: CNY5ZTN8E3
- CompTox Dashboard (EPA): DTXSID401045922

Chemical and physical data
- Formula: C_{21}H_{26}O_{2}
- Molar mass: 310.437 g·mol^{−1}
- 3D model (JSmol): Interactive image
- SMILES: CCCCCC1=CC(=C(C(=C1)O)C2=C(C=CC(=C2)C)C(=C)C)O
- InChI: InChI=1S/C21H26O2/c1-5-6-7-8-16-12-19(22)21(20(23)13-16)18-11-15(4)9-10-17(18)14(2)3/h9-13,22-23H,2,5-8H2,1,3-4H3; Key:TWKHUZXSTKISQC-UHFFFAOYSA-N

Cannabinodiol (CBND), also known as cannabidinodiol, cannabinoid that is present in the plant Cannabis sativa at low concentrations. It is the fully aromatized derivative of cannabidiol (CBD) and can occur as a product of the photochemical conversion of cannabinol (CBN).

== See also ==
- Cannabidiol
- Cannabinol
- Cannabichromene
- Cannabimovone
- Delta-6-CBD
- Dimethylheptylpyran
- HU-210
- Nabilone
- Parahexyl
- Tetrahydrocannabivarin
