= HU-331 =

Names
- Preferred IUPAC name 3-Hydroxy-2-[(1R,6R)-3-methyl-6-(prop-1-en-2-yl)cyclohex-2-en-1-yl]-5-pentylcyclohexa-2,5-diene-1,4-dione

Identifiers
CAS Number	137252-25-6
3D model (JSmol)	Interactive image
ChemSpider	9568213
PubChem CID	126249
UNII	I7Q196L4AU
CompTox Dashboard (EPA)	DTXSID10929758
- InChI: InChI=1S/C21H28O3/c1-5-6-7-8-15-12-18(22)19(21(24)20(15)23)17-11-14(4)9-10-16(17)13(2)3/h11-12,16-17,24H,2,5-10H2,1,3-4H3/t16-,17+/m0/s1 Key: WDXXEUARVHTWQF-DLBZAZTESA-N
- SMILES: O=C\1C(\O)=C(/C(=O)/C=C/1CCCCC)[C@@H]2\C=C(/CC[C@H]2\C(=C)C)C

Properties
Chemical formula	C_{21}H_{28}O_{3}
Molar mass	328.445 g/mol
- Except where otherwise noted, data are given for materials in their standard state (at 25 °C [77 °F], 100 kPa). verify (what is ?) Infobox references

HU-331 is a quinone anticarcinogenic drug synthesized from cannabidiol, a cannabinoid in the Cannabis sativa plant. It showed a great efficacy against oncogenic human cells. HU-331 does not cause arrest in cell cycle, cell apoptosis or caspase activation. HU-331 inhibits DNA topoisomerase II even at nanomolar concentrations, but has shown a negligible effect on the action of DNA topoisomerase I. The cannabinoid quinone HU-331 is a very specific inhibitor of topoisomerase II, compared with most known anticancer quinones. One of the main objectives of these studies is the development of a new quinone derived compound that produces anti-neoplastic activity while maintaining low toxicity at therapeutic doses. HU-331 has also shown itself to be a mechanism-based suicide inhibitor of CYP3A4, CYP2C9, and CYP2C19. HU-331 is produced in some quantities as a metabolic byproduct in the human body by hepatic CYP3A4 conversion of orally administered CBD only for the enzyme to be subsequently destroyed afterwards; as such certain medications must be monitored when taking CBD orally.

== Mechanism of action ==
Inhibitors of topoisomerases can act at two different levels. First inhibiting topoisomerase, which stabilize the topoisomerase-DNA complex and thus introduce DNA breaks in the wires that lead to apoptosis, then inhibiting the catalytic activity of topoisomerase, which hinders the activity of these enzymes without introducing breaks into the DNA chains. HU-331 seems to be a catalytic inhibitor of topoisomerase II, probably by enzymatic ligation to the protein. This molecule does not cause damage to DNA, but protects cells from damage, natural, or induced by other inhibitors of topoisomerase II that act as inhibitors of topoisomerase. Even when 60% of the target cells are killed by treatment with HU-331, other cells' nucleic content remains unharmed, with less breakage of DNA chains that control important cellular functions.

Doxorubicin, like other anticancer quinones, was used for chemotherapy in human cancers for many years. The mechanism of action of these drugs has been the subject of considerable controversy since chemotherapeutic drugs exert their cytotoxic effect on target cells by nonspecific mechanisms. The doxorubicin damages DNA by intercalation, the generation of reactive oxygen species and inhibition of DNA topoisomerase I and II. This leads to breaking the chains of DNA single and double strands. The protein associated with these ruptures are the topoisomerase II and DNA damage is catalyzed by this enzyme. Thus, while doxorubicin and other anthraquinones act through many mechanisms such as apoptosis, abrogation of the cell cycle cell, activation of caspases, generation of ROS, inhibition of both topoisomerases, activation of intracellular secondary messengers, etc. Hu-331 is more active and less toxic, since it generates reactive oxygen species in the heart and has a specific activity that gives great potential to develop as a new anticancer drug, according to Kogan et al.

Cannabinoids can act as anticancer compounds killing several oncogenic cells followed by direct interaction with cannabinoid receptors. The growth of glioma is inhibited by a selective activation of the CB2 cannabinoid receptor and endogenous cannabinoids such as anandamide inhibit the proliferation of cells involved in lung cancer. The reason behind the antitumor effect of HU-331 appears unknown as cannabinoid receptor antagonists do not inhibit HU-331, despite being mediated by a cannabinoid receptor. The HU-331 exerts an antiangiogenic effect accompanied by apoptosis of endothelial cells. Although in some studies. HU-331 has not caused the death of cells by oncogenic apoptosis. The conclusion that would lead cells to apoptosis based on treatment with the drug did not increase the proportion of cells containing DNA Lues in the sub-G1 phase and have not found the expression of caspase-3 in cancer cells.

== Legal status ==
=== United States ===
HU-331 is not scheduled at the federal level in the United States.

==== Florida ====
"HU-331 (3-hydroxy-2-[(1R,6R)-3-methyl-6-(1- methylethenyl)-2-cyclohexen-1-yl]-5-pentyl-2,5-cyclohexadiene-1,4-dione)" is a Schedule I controlled substance in the state of Florida making it illegal to buy, sell, or possess in Florida.

==== Wisconsin ====
"3-hydroxy-2-[(1R,6R)-3-methyl-6-(1-methylethenyl)-2-cyclohexen-1-yl]-5-pentyl-2,5-cyclohexadiene-1,4-dione, commonly known as HU-331" is a Schedule I controlled substance in the state of Wisconsin making it illegal to buy, sell, or possess in Wisconsin.

=== Hungary ===
HU-331 is included on the list of novel psychoactive substances (55/2014. [XII. 30.] EMMI rendelet) in Hungary.

== See also ==
- HU-345
- HU-320
- HU-336
