= 7-Hydroxycannabidiol =

Chemical compound

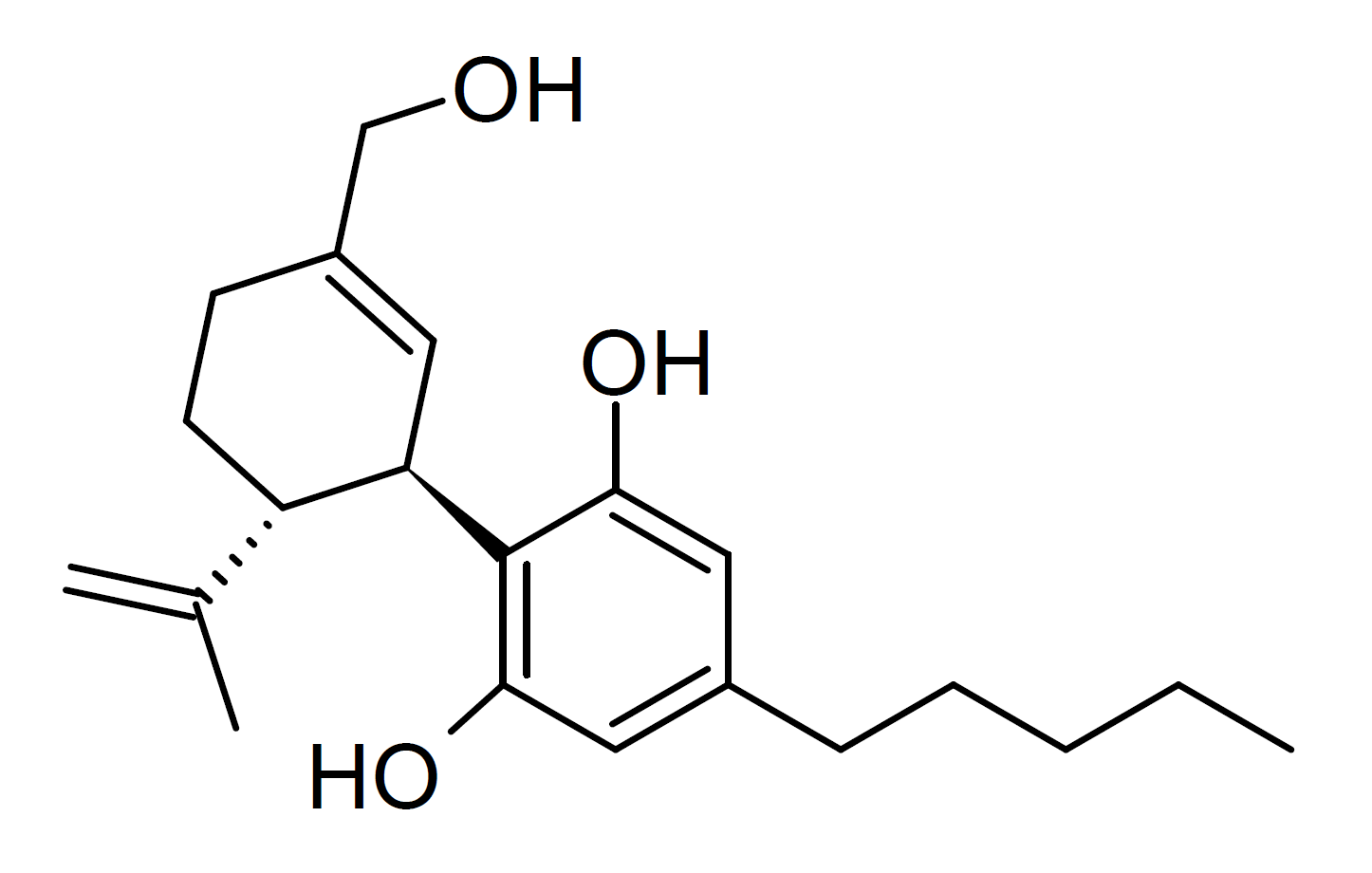

Identifiers
- IUPAC name: 2-[(1R,6R)-3-(Hydroxymethyl)-6-prop-1-en-2-ylcyclohex-2-en-1-yl]-5-pentylbenzene-1,3-diol
- CAS Number: 50725-17-2
- PubChem CID: 11301963
- ChemSpider: 9476939
- UNII: N38G7JB3K2
- ChEBI: CHEBI:133053
- CompTox Dashboard (EPA): DTXSID801355941

Chemical and physical data
- Formula: C_{21}H_{30}O_{3}
- Molar mass: 330.468 g·mol^{−1}
- 3D model (JSmol): Interactive image
- SMILES: CCCCCC1=CC(=C(C(=C1)O)[C@@H]2C=C(CC[C@H]2C(=C)C)CO)O
- InChI: InChI=1S/C21H30O3/c1-4-5-6-7-15-11-19(23)21(20(24)12-15)18-10-16(13-22)8-9-17(18)14(2)3/h10-12,17-18,22-24H,2,4-9,13H2,1,3H3/t17-,18+/m0/s1; Key:ZELUXPWDPVXUEI-ZWKOTPCHSA-N

7-Hydroxycannabidiol (7-OH-CBD) is an active metabolite of cannabidiol, generated in the body from cannabidiol by the action of the enzyme CYP2C19. While methods have been developed for its synthetic production, and measurement of levels in the body following consumption of cannabidiol, its pharmacology has been relatively little studied, though it has been found to possess similar anticonvulsant effects to cannabidiol itself, as well as lowering blood triglyceride levels. Like its precursor CBD, it is not known to exhibit any psychoactive effects on the body and is known to counter the psychoactive effects of THC if it is present at the same time. This mode of action in 2015 was discovered to be at least contributing in part by being a non competitive negative allosteric modulator of the Cannabinoid receptor type 1.

== See also ==
- 4'-Fluorocannabidiol
- 8,9-Dihydrocannabidiol
- 8,11-Dihydroxytetrahydrocannabinol
- 11-Hydroxy-THC
- Cannabidiolic acid
- Cannabidiol dimethyl ether
- Delta-6-Cannabidiol
- HU-308
- HU-320
- KLS-13019
