= Cannabidiol dimethyl ether =

Chemical compound

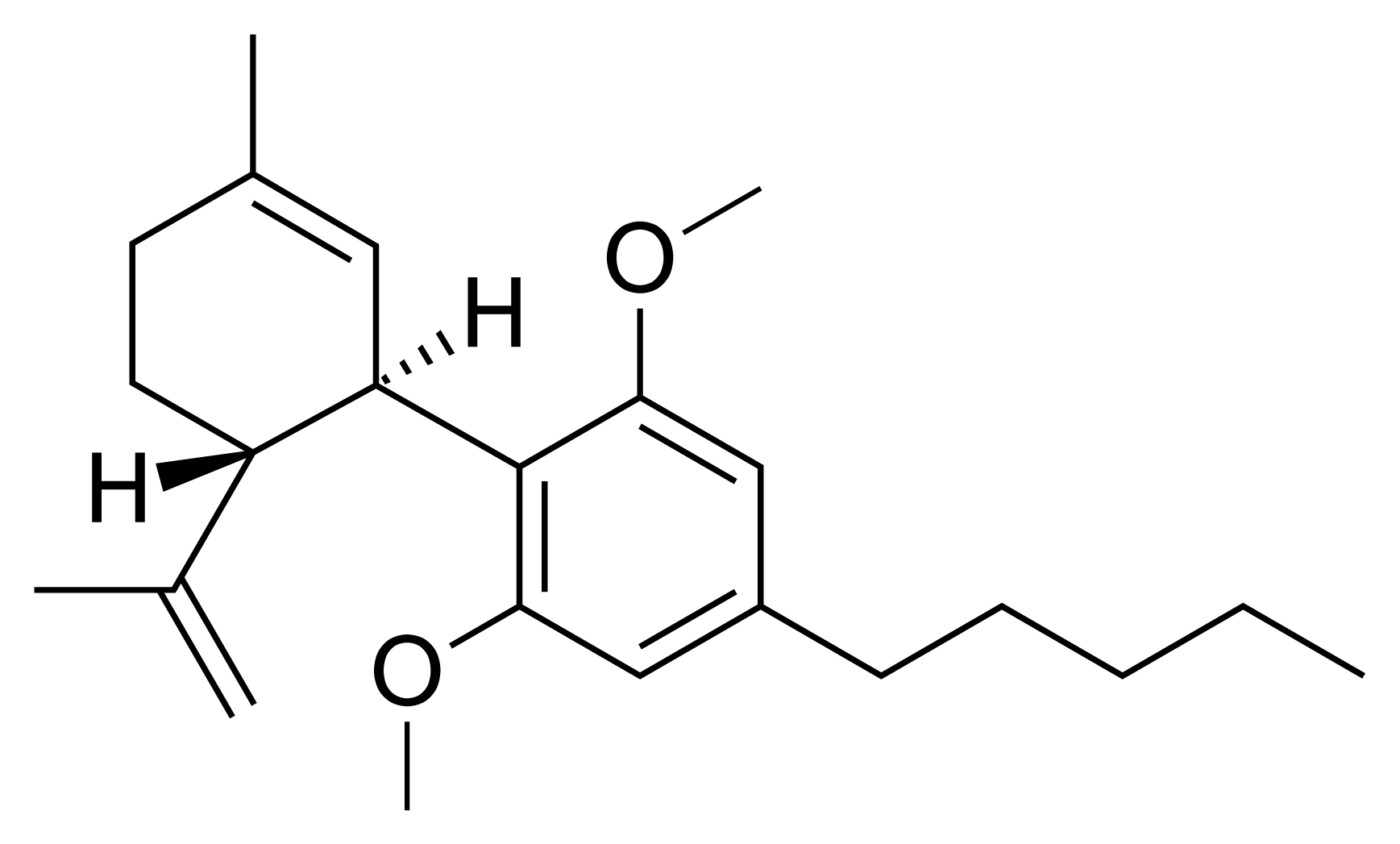

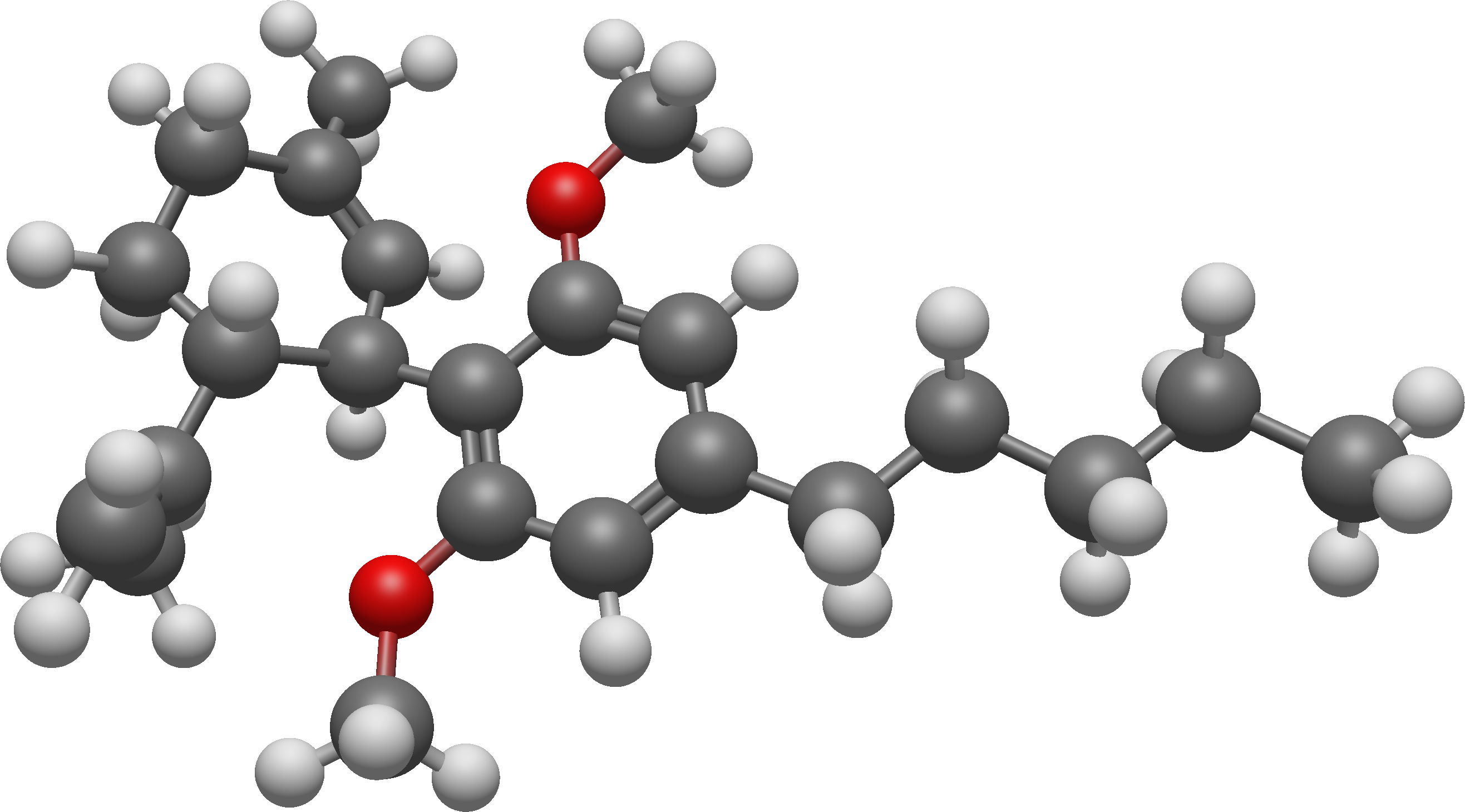

Identifiers
- IUPAC name: 1,3-dimethoxy-2-[(1R,6R)-3-methyl-6-prop-1-en-2-ylcyclohex-2-en-1-yl]-5-pentylbenzene
- CAS Number: 1242-67-7
- PubChem CID: 3081957
- ChemSpider: 2339454
- UNII: MK7IHZ7MIM
- ChEMBL: ChEMBL499322
- CompTox Dashboard (EPA): DTXSID00924752

Chemical and physical data
- Formula: C_{23}H_{34}O_{2}
- Molar mass: 342.523 g·mol^{−1}
- 3D model (JSmol): Interactive image
- SMILES: CCCCCC1=CC(=C(C(=C1)OC)[C@@H]2C=C(CC[C@H]2C(=C)C)C)OC
- InChI: InChI=1S/C23H34O2/c1-7-8-9-10-18-14-21(24-5)23(22(15-18)25-6)20-13-17(4)11-12-19(20)16(2)3/h13-15,19-20H,2,7-12H2,1,3-6H3/t19-,20+/m0/s1; Key:UYBGHBAVRNATET-VQTJNVASSA-N

Cannabidiol dimethyl ether (CBDD) is a trace component of cannabis which can also be made synthetically. It is a potent and selective inhibitor of the enzyme 15-lipoxygenase and inhibits oxygenation of linoleic acid, a process involved in the development of atherosclerosis.

== See also ==
- 4'-Fluorocannabidiol
- 7-Hydroxycannabidiol
- 8,9-Dihydrocannabidiol
- Cannabicitran
- Cannabidiol diacetate
- Delta-6-Cannabidiol
- Delta-8-THCM
- KLS-13019
- O-1918
