= 4'-Fluorocannabidiol =

Chemical compound

Legal status
- Legal status: CA: Schedule II

Identifiers
- IUPAC name: 4-Fluoro-2-[(1R,6R)-3-methyl-6-(prop-1-en-2-yl)cyclohex-2-en-1-yl]-5-pentylbenzene-1,3-diol
- CAS Number: 1619228-89-5
- PubChem CID: 76285390
- ChemSpider: 58191436
- UNII: 8LVY7H2WCK
- CompTox Dashboard (EPA): DTXSID901336033

Chemical and physical data
- Formula: C_{21}H_{29}FO_{2}
- Molar mass: 332.459 g·mol^{−1}
- 3D model (JSmol): Interactive image
- SMILES: CCCCCC1=CC(=C(C(=C1F)O)[C@@H]2C=C(CC[C@H]2C(=C)C)C)O
- InChI: InChI=1S/C21H29FO2/c1-5-6-7-8-15-12-18(23)19(21(24)20(15)22)17-11-14(4)9-10-16(17)13(2)3/h11-12,16-17,23-24H,2,5-10H2,1,3-4H3/t16-,17+/m0/s1; Key:OGZHPYIVJQZXQS-DLBZAZTESA-N

4'-Fluorocannabidiol (also known as PECS-101 and 4'-F-CBD, and formerly as HUF-101 and HU-474) is a fluorinated cannabidiol derivative that has more potent anxiolytic, antidepressant, antipsychotic and anti-compulsive activity in mice compared to its parent compound. It was first synthesized in 2016, alongside 10-fluorocannabidiol diacetate and 8,9-dihydro-7-fluorocannabidiol, which showed much weaker activity.

== Synthesis ==
4'-Fluorocannabidiol has been synthesized from isolated cannabidiol by putting it in dry dichloromethane and adding 1-fluoropyridinium triflate.

== See also ==
- 2-Cl-HHC
- 7-Hydroxycannabidiol
- 8,9-Dihydrocannabidiol
- Abnormal cannabidiol
- Cannabinoids
- Cannabinoid receptors
- HU-331
- KLS-13019
- O-1602
- O-1918
