= Lysergic acid cyclobutylamide =

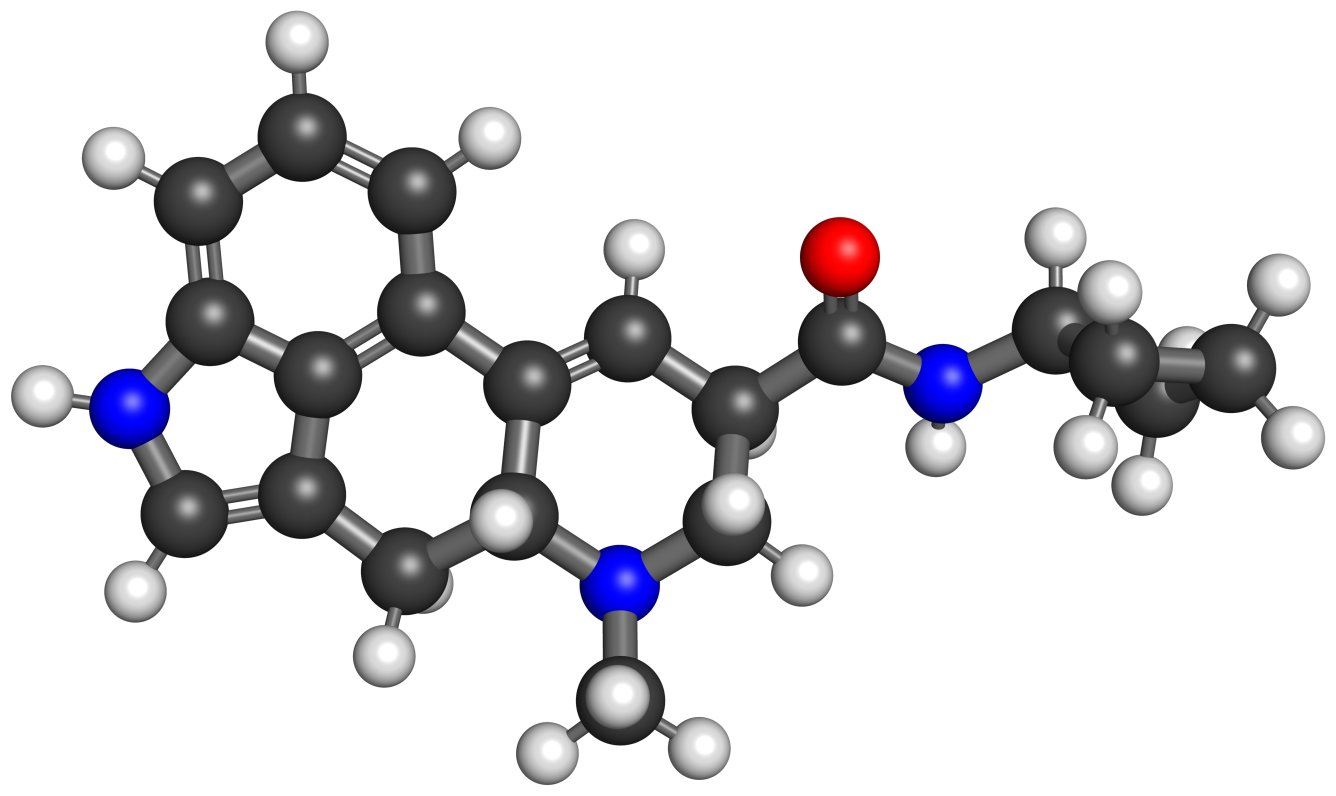

Clinical data
- Other names: LAcB; C_{4}AL; N-Cyclobutyllysergamide; N-Cyclobutyl-lysergamide; NCB-LA

Identifiers
- IUPAC name: (6aR,9R)-N-cyclobutyl-7-methyl-6,6a,8,9-tetrahydro-4H-indolo[4,3-fg]quinoline-9-carboxamide
- PubChem CID: 129844515

Chemical and physical data
- Formula: C_{20}H_{23}N_{3}O
- Molar mass: 321.424 g·mol^{−1}
- 3D model (JSmol): Interactive image
- SMILES: CN1C[C@@H](C=C2[C@H]1CC3=CNC4=CC=CC2=C34)C(=O)NC5CCC5
- InChI: InChI=1S/C20H23N3O/c1-23-11-13(20(24)22-14-4-2-5-14)8-16-15-6-3-7-17-19(15)12(10-21-17)9-18(16)23/h3,6-8,10,13-14,18,21H,2,4-5,9,11H2,1H3,(H,22,24)/t13-,18-/m1/s1; Key:FFKNJJLUPIWGFL-FZKQIMNGSA-N

Lysergic acid cyclobutylamide (LAcB or C_{4}AL), also known as N-cyclobutyllysergamide (NCB-LA), is a semisynthetic lysergamide that is synthesized from naturally occurring ergot alkaloids found in Claviceps purpurea. It has oxytocic effects on the isolated rat uterus similarly to other lysergamides, shows antiserotonergic effects in the isolated rat intestine similarly to lysergic acid diethylamide (LSD), has mydriatic effects similarly to LSD when administered to mice, and produces other biological effects. Despite being more effective than LSD in various bioassays however, LAcB did not have psychedelic effects in humans. The drug was first described in the scientific literature by 1958.

== See also ==
- Substituted lysergamide
- Lysergic acid cyclopentylamide (cepentil; C_{5}AL)
- Amesergide (LY-237733)
- LY-215840
- ECPLA
- Lysergic acid morpholide (LSM-775)
- LPD-824 (lysergic acid pyrrolidine)
- LSD-Pip (lysergic acid piperidine)
- Lysergic acid 2,4-dimethylazetidide (LA-SS-Az, LSZ)
- Lysergic acid tert-butylamide (LAtB)
