= C20H23N3O =

The molecular formula C_{20}H_{23}N_{3}O may refer to:

- LA-Aziridine
- LPD-824
- Lysergic acid cyclobutylamide
- TRALA-12
- LEK-8822
