= C21H25N3O =

The molecular formula C_{21}H_{25}N_{3}O (molar mass: 335.44 g/mol) may refer to:

- Cepentil
- ECPLA (N-ethyl-N-cyclopropyllysergamide)
- LSD-Pip
- LSD-Quinoline
- Lysergic acid 2,4-dimethylazetidide
- MPD-75
