= Cepentil =

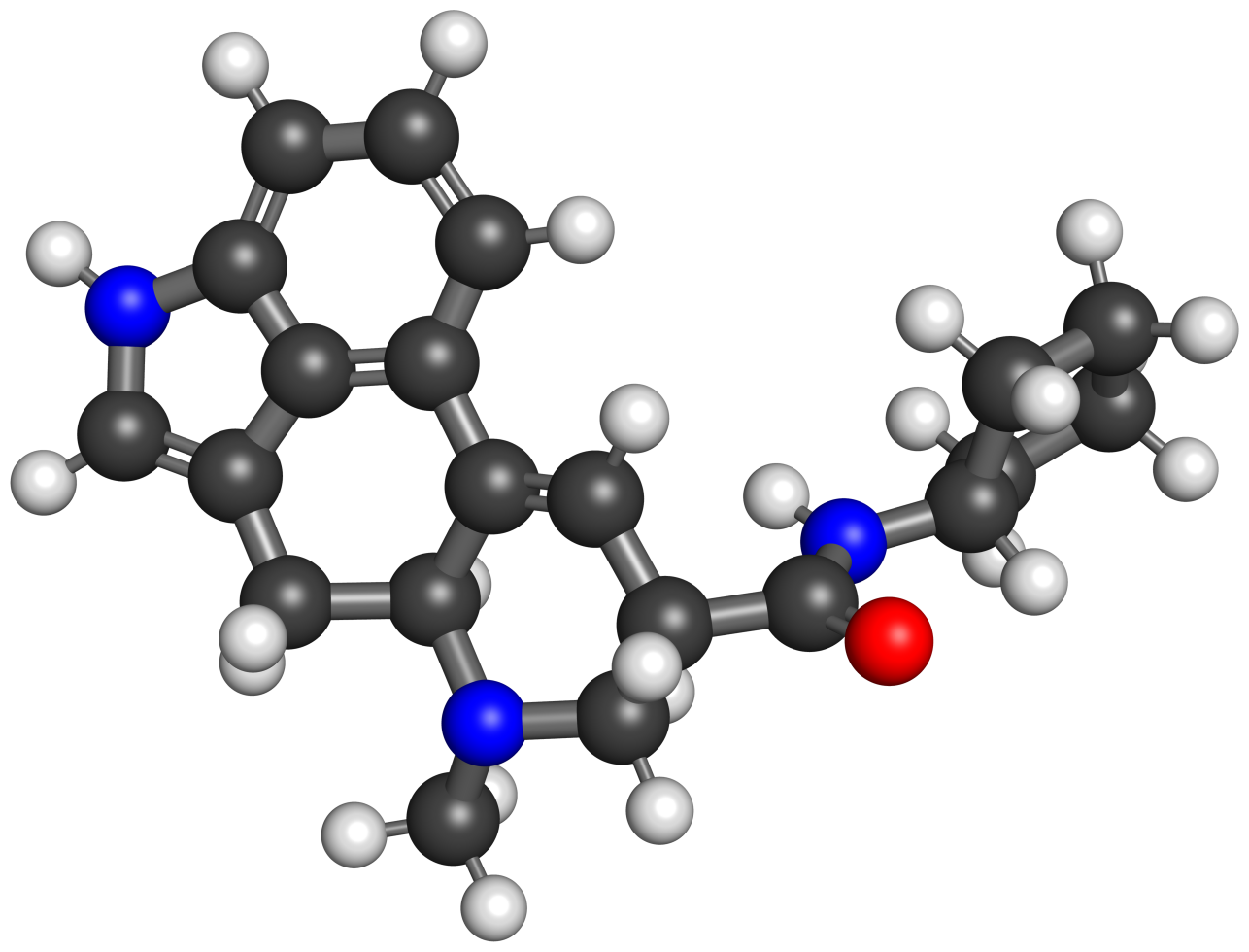

Clinical data
- Other names: Tsepentil; N-Cyclopentyllysergamide; NCPe-LA; N-Cyclopentyl-lysergamide; LCyP; C_{5}AL

Identifiers
- IUPAC name: N-cyclopentyl-7-methyl-6,6a,8,9-tetrahydro-4H-indolo[4,3-fg]quinoline-9-carboxamide
- PubChem CID: 171933571
- ChemSpider: 95545978

Chemical and physical data
- Formula: C_{21}H_{25}N_{3}O
- Molar mass: 335.451 g·mol^{−1}
- 3D model (JSmol): Interactive image
- SMILES: CN1CC(C=C2C1CC3=CNC4=CC=CC2=C34)C(=O)NC5CCCC5
- InChI: InChI=1S/C21H25N3O/c1-24-12-14(21(25)23-15-5-2-3-6-15)9-17-16-7-4-8-18-20(16)13(11-22-18)10-19(17)24/h4,7-9,11,14-15,19,22H,2-3,5-6,10,12H2,1H3,(H,23,25); Key:GIUWLXABHBAKDK-UHFFFAOYSA-N

Cepentil, or Tsepentil, also known as N-cyclopentyllysergamide (NCPe-LA) or as lysergic acid cyclopentylamide (LCyP), is an analogue of LSD developed in the former Soviet Union which acts as an antagonist at serotonin receptors. It does not produce hallucinogen-like effects in animal studies, instead being described as an "energizer" by contemporary sources, suggesting an action similar to the antidementia drug hydergine, however the pharmacology of cepentil has not been studied with modern techniques.

== See also ==
- Substituted lysergamide
- Lysergic acid cyclobutylamide
- Amesergide
- LAE-32
- LPD-824
- LY-215840
- Lysergic acid 2-butyl amide
- Lysergic acid 3-pentyl amide
- List of Russian drugs
