= C20H26N2O3 =

The molecular formula C_{20}H_{26}N_{2}O_{3} (molar mass: 342.439 g/mol) may refer to:

- Cilostamide
- Naltrexamine
- LY-86057
