= Robert Oberlender =

American medicinal chemist

Robert Arthur Oberlender
- Born: July 25, 1956 (age 70); Philadelphia, Pennsylvania
- Education: Temple University (B.S.), Purdue University (Ph.D.)
- Occupations: Medicinal chemist; Assistant professor
- Years active: 1984–present
- Organization(s): Purdue University (1981–1995); University of the Pacific; New River Pharmaceuticals (2000–2007); Synthonics (2007–)
- Known for: Work in the area of serotonergic and dopaminergic drugs, discovery and development of lisdexamfetamine (Vyvanse)

Robert Arthur Oberlender (born July 25, 1956) is an American medicinal chemist known for his work in the areas of serotonergic and dopaminergic drugs as well as drug discrimination. He is most well known for his discovery and development of lisdexamfetamine (lysine–dextroamphetamine), which is now marketed as a pharmaceutical drug under the brand name Vyvanse and is prescribed as a misuse-resistant stimulant in the treatment of attention deficit hyperactivity disorder (ADHD) and other conditions.

== Biography ==
Oberlender attended the pharmacy school of Temple University in his hometown of Philadelphia, Pennsylvania, receiving a bachelor's degree, and worked for two years as a pharmacist. Then, he started a Ph.D. program in medicinal chemistry at Purdue University in 1981. He worked in the lab of psychedelic chemist David E. Nichols studying psychedelics, entactogens, and related drugs, first completing his Ph.D. and then continuing in the lab as a postdoc. His first publication with the lab was in 1984 and his last publication with the group was in 1995, a period spanning more than 10 years. His Ph.D. thesis, published in 1989, was on stereoselective actions of psychedelics, including the lysergamides LA-Aziridine and LA-3Cl-SB and the DOx drugs DOIB and DOSB, as well as on drug discrimination studies of entactogens, including MDA, MDMA, MBDB, and MDAI.

Oberlender personally self-experimented with some of the psychoactive drugs synthesized in the Nichols lab. In the mid-1990s, he tried the obscure psychedelic tryptamine 5-MeO-pyr-T, a synthetic analogue of 5-MeO-DMT, and accidentally took too high of a dose of it without a trip sitter present. While under the influence of 5-MeO-pyr-T, Oberlender stripped naked, began wandering the Purdue University campus in a fugue state, and was apprehended by campus police. His case did not end up going to court, but the incident did result in Oberlender having to leave Nichols's lab. His experience with 5-MeO-pyr-T was subsequently published anonymously in Alexander Shulgin's 1997 book TiHKAL (Tryptamines I Have Known and Loved). The chemist publicly shared further details of the incident during an interview with psychedelic journalist Hamilton Morris in 2021, describing it as a cautionary tale of the risks of self-experimentation with little-known psychoactive drugs and the importance of careful dose escalation and of having a trip sitter.

After leaving the Nichols lab, Oberlender worked as an assistant professor of medicinal chemistry at the University of the Pacific in Stockton, California. In 2000, he joined New River Pharmaceuticals in Blacksburg, Virginia and served as a director of drug misuse science. While at New River Pharmaceuticals, Oberlender had a key role in discovering and developing the misuse-resistant dextroamphetamine prodrug and psychostimulant lisdexamfetamine, which had the developmental code name NRP-104. Oberlender and colleagues patented lisdexamfetamine in 2006 and 2007. New River Pharmaceuticals was purchased by Shire in 2007. That same year, lisdexamfetamine was initially approved and introduced for medical use under the brand name Vyvanse in the United States. Following these events, Oberlender started working at Synthonics in Blackburg, Virginia and began developing metal-coordinated pharmaceutical drugs at the company.

== Selected publications ==
- Nichols, David E.; Oberlender, Robert (5 January 1984). "Behavioral Techniques in Neuroreceptor Research". Frontiers of Neurology and Neuroscience. Vol. 10. S. Karger AG. pp. 108–119. doi:10.1159/000408385. ISBN 978-3-8055-3715-5. PMID 6321967.
- Oberlender RA, Kothari PJ, Nichols DE, Zabik JE (June 1984). "Substituent branching in phenethylamine-type hallucinogens: a comparison of 1-[2,5-dimethoxy-4-(2-butyl)phenyl]-2-aminopropane and 1-[2,5-dimethoxy-4-(2-methylpropyl)phenyl]-2-aminopropane" (PDF). J Med Chem. 27 (6): 788–92. doi:10.1021/jm00372a015. PMID 6737421.
- Nichols DE, Schooler D, Yeung MC, Oberlender RA, Zabik JE (September 1984). "Unreliability of the rat stomach fundus as a predictor of hallucinogenic activity in substituted phenethylamines". Life Sci. 35 (13): 1343–1348. doi:10.1016/0024-3205(84)90390-4. PMID 6482656.
- Nichols DE, Hoffman AJ, Oberlender RA, Jacob P, Shulgin AT (October 1986). "Derivatives of 1-(1,3-benzodioxol-5-yl)-2-butanamine: representatives of a novel therapeutic class" (PDF). J Med Chem. 29 (10): 2009–2015. doi:10.1021/jm00160a035. PMID 3761319.
- Oberlender R, Nichols DE (1988). "Drug discrimination studies with MDMA and amphetamine". Psychopharmacology (Berl). 95 (1): 71–76. doi:10.1007/BF00212770. PMID 2898791.
- Nichols DE, Oberlender R (1989). "Structure-activity relationships of MDMA-like substances" (PDF). NIDA Res Monogr. 94: 1–29. PMID 2575223. Archived from the original (PDF) on May 11, 2023.
- Oberlender, Robert Arthur (May 1989). Stereoselective Aspects of Hallucinogenic Drug Action and Drug Discrimination Studies of Entactogens (Thesis). Purdue University. Archived from the original on 15 June 2025. "VITA: Robert Oberlender was born on July 25, 1956 to Martin and Betty Oberlender in Philadelphia, Pennsylvania. [...]" Alt URL
- Nichols DE, Brewster WK, Johnson MP, Oberlender R, Riggs RM (February 1990). "Nonneurotoxic tetralin and indan analogues of 3,4-(methylenedioxy)amphetamine (MDA)". J Med Chem. 33 (2): 703–710. doi:10.1021/jm00164a037. PMID 1967651.
- Nichols DE, Oberlender R (1990). "Structure-activity relationships of MDMA and related compounds: a new class of psychoactive drugs?". Ann N Y Acad Sci. 600: 613–623, discussion 623–625. doi:10.1007/978-1-4613-1485-1_7. PMID 1979214.
- Nichols, David F.; Oberlender, Robert (1990). "Structure-Activity Relationships of MDMA and Related Compounds: A New Class of Psychoactive Agents?". Ecstasy: The Clinical, Pharmacological and Neurotoxicological Effects of the Drug MDMA. Vol. 9. Boston, MA: Springer US. pp. 105–131. doi:10.1007/978-1-4613-1485-1_7. ISBN 978-1-4612-8799-5. PMID 1979214.
- Nichols DE, Oberlender R, McKenna DJ (1991). "Stereochemical Aspects of Hallucinogenesis". In Watson RR (ed.). Biochemistry and Physiology of Substance Abuse. Vol. 3. Boca Raton, Fla.: CRC Press. pp. 1–39. ISBN 978-0-8493-4463-3. OCLC 26748320.
- Johnson MP, Frescas SP, Oberlender R, Nichols DE (May 1991). "Synthesis and pharmacological examination of 1-(3-methoxy-4-methylphenyl)-2-aminopropane and 5-methoxy-6-methyl-2-aminoindan: similarities to 3,4-(methylenedioxy)methamphetamine (MDMA)" (PDF). J Med Chem. 34 (5): 1662–1668. doi:10.1021/jm00109a020. PMID 1674539.
- Nichols DE, Johnson MP, Oberlender R (January 1991). "5-Iodo-2-aminoindan, a nonneurotoxic analogue of p-iodoamphetamine". Pharmacol Biochem Behav. 38 (1): 135–139. doi:10.1016/0091-3057(91)90601-w. PMID 1826785.
- Oberlender R, Pfaff RC, Johnson MP, Huang XM, Nichols DE (January 1992). "Stereoselective LSD-like activity in d-lysergic acid amides of (R)- and (S)-2-aminobutane". J Med Chem. 35 (2): 203–211. doi:10.1021/jm00080a001. PMID 1732537.
- Pfaff RC, Huang X, Marona-Lewicka D, Oberlender R, Nichols DE (1994). "Lysergamides revisited" (PDF). NIDA Res Monogr. 146: 52–73. PMID 8742794. Archived from the original (PDF) on August 5, 2023.

== See also ==
- List of psychedelic chemists
- David E. Nichols
- Alexander Shulgin
- Richard Glennon
- David Repke
- Matthew J. Baggott
