= Lysergyl-L-valyl methyl ester =

Clinical data
- Other names: N-[[9,10-didehydro-6-methylergolin-8β-yl]carbonyl]valine methyl ester
- ATC code: None

Identifiers
- IUPAC name: methyl 2-[[(6aR,9R)-7-methyl-6,6a,8,9-tetrahydro-4H-indolo[4,3-fg]quinoline-9-carbonyl]amino]-3-methylbutanoate
- PubChem CID: 139583461
- ChemSpider: 78439920
- ChEBI: CHEBI:198709

Chemical and physical data
- Formula: C_{22}H_{27}N_{3}O_{3}
- Molar mass: 381.476 g·mol^{−1}
- 3D model (JSmol): Interactive image
- SMILES: CC(C)C(C(=O)OC)NC(=O)[C@H]1CN([C@@H]2CC3=CNC4=CC=CC(=C34)C2=C1)C
- InChI: InChI=1S/C22H27N3O3/c1-12(2)20(22(27)28-4)24-21(26)14-8-16-15-6-5-7-17-19(15)13(10-23-17)9-18(16)25(3)11-14/h5-8,10,12,14,18,20,23H,9,11H2,1-4H3,(H,24,26)/t14-,18-,20?/m1/s1; Key:PUSHWZUNZAQTHW-GNTSEGDPSA-N

Lysergyl-L-valyl methyl ester is an ergot alkaloid and lysergamide found as a minor constituent in Claviceps purpurea (ergot). It is an analogue of ergovalide. The compound was first isolated and described in the scientific literature by Albert Hofmann and colleagues in 1963.

== See also ==
- Substituted lysergamide
- Ergopeptine
- Ergovalide
- Lysergyl-alanine
- Ergosecaline
