= LA-Azepane =

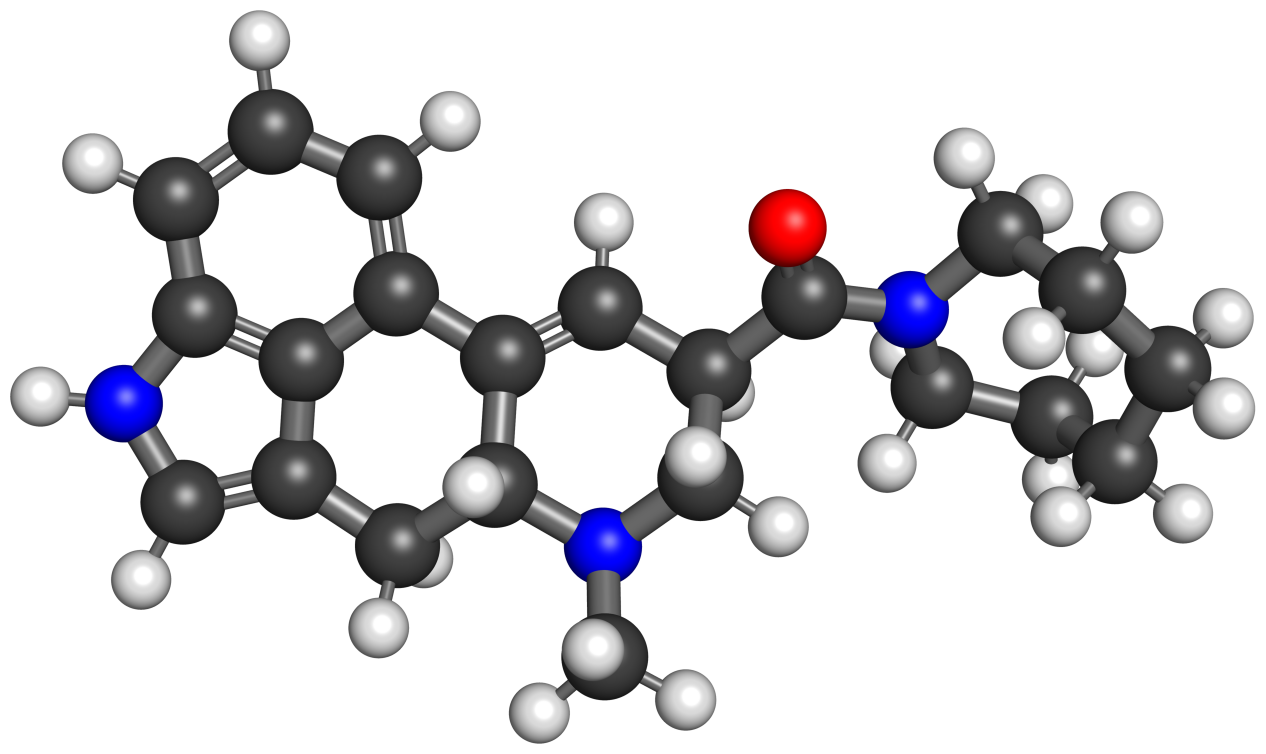

Clinical data
- Other names: LSD-Azepane; Lysergic acid azepane; Lysergic acid hexamethylene imide; N-(Azepan-1-yl)lysergamide
- ATC code: None

Identifiers
- IUPAC name: (Azepan-1-yl)[(6aS,9R)-7-methyl-4,6,6a,7,8,9-hexahydroindolo[4,3-fg]quinolin-9-yl]methanone

Chemical and physical data
- Formula: C_{22}H_{27}N_{3}O
- Molar mass: 349.478 g·mol^{−1}
- 3D model (JSmol): Interactive image
- SMILES: CN1C[C@@H](C=C2[C@H]1Cc1c[nH]c3c1c2ccc3)C(=O)N1CCCCCC1
- InChI: InChI=1S/C22H27N3O/c1-24-14-16(22(26)25-9-4-2-3-5-10-25)11-18-17-7-6-8-19-21(17)15(13-23-19)12-20(18)24/h6-8,11,13,16,20,23H,2-5,9-10,12,14H2,1H3/t16-,20-/m1/s1; Key:WBZXJLBFYQVYOH-OXQOHEQNSA-N

LA-Azepane, or LSD-Azepane, also known as lysergic acid azepane or as lysergic acid hexamethylene imide, is a chemical compound of the lysergamide family related to lysergic acid diethylamide (LSD). It is an derivative of LSD in which the N,N-diethylamide moiety has been cyclized to form an azepane ring. The compound is very little studied and described itself, but is closely related to other amide-cyclized LSD analogues including LA-Pip, LSM-775 (LA-Morph), LPD-824 (LA-Pyr), LPN, LSZ (LA-Azetidide), and LA-Aziridine, among others. The chemical synthesis of the compound has been described. LA-Azepane was first described in the literature in a patent by Richard P. Pioch at Eli Lilly and Company in 1961. The patent had been filed 5 years previously in 1956.

== See also ==
- Substituted lysergamide
