= LY-86057 =

Clinical data
- Other names: LY86057; 6-Methylergoline-8β-carboxylic acid 2-hydroxy-1-methylpropyl ester
- Drug class: Serotonin receptor modulator; Serotonin 5-HT_{2A} receptor antagonist
- ATC code: None

Identifiers
- IUPAC name: 3-hydroxybutan-2-yl (6aR,9R,10aR)-7-methyl-6,6a,8,9,10,10a-hexahydro-4H-indolo[4,3-fg]quinoline-9-carboxylate
- CAS Number: 148966-66-9
- PubChem CID: 101651352
- ChemSpider: 115284418

Chemical and physical data
- Formula: C_{20}H_{26}N_{2}O_{3}
- Molar mass: 342.439 g·mol^{−1}
- 3D model (JSmol): Interactive image
- SMILES: CC(C(C)OC(=O)[C@@H]1C[C@H]2[C@@H](CC3=CNC4=CC=CC2=C34)N(C1)C)O
- InChI: InChI=1S/C20H26N2O3/c1-11(23)12(2)25-20(24)14-7-16-15-5-4-6-17-19(15)13(9-21-17)8-18(16)22(3)10-14/h4-6,9,11-12,14,16,18,21,23H,7-8,10H2,1-3H3/t11?,12?,14-,16-,18-/m1/s1; Key:GOHDSZGHAHFEHG-JZLGIKSISA-N

LY-86057 is a serotonin receptor modulator of the ergoline family. It is the N1-desisopropyl analogue of the much better-known ergoline and serotonin receptor antagonist LY-53857.

The drug shows high affinity for the serotonin 5-HT_{2} receptors, including for the serotonin 5-HT_{2A} receptor (K_{i} = 1.79–55.9 nM) and for the serotonin 5-HT_{2B} receptor (K_{i} = 12.2–12.3 nM), whereas its affinity for the serotonin 5-HT_{2C} receptor was not determined. It shows more than 10-fold greater affinity for the human, monkey, and pig serotonin 5-HT_{2A} receptors than for the rat serotonin 5-HT_{2A} receptor. LY-86057 is said to act as an antagonist of the serotonin 5-HT_{2A} receptor. It also shows high affinity for the serotonin 5-HT_{1F} receptor (K_{i} = 12.2 nM).

Other analogues of LY-86057 besides LY-53857 (the N1-isopropyl derivative) have also been described, for instance LY-108742 (the N1-methyl derivative) and LY-197541 (the N1-isobutyl derivative).

LY-86057 was first described in the scientific literature by 1993.

== See also ==
- Substituted ergoline
- LY-53857
- LY-215840
- Ergometrine
- LA-3Cl-SB
