= C23H32N2O3 =

The molecular formula C_{23}H_{32}N_{2}O_{3} (molar mass: 384.512 g/mol, exact mass: 384.2413 u) may refer to:

- MDMB-CHMICA
- LY-53857
- Zipeprol
