= Lysergic acid pyrrolinide =

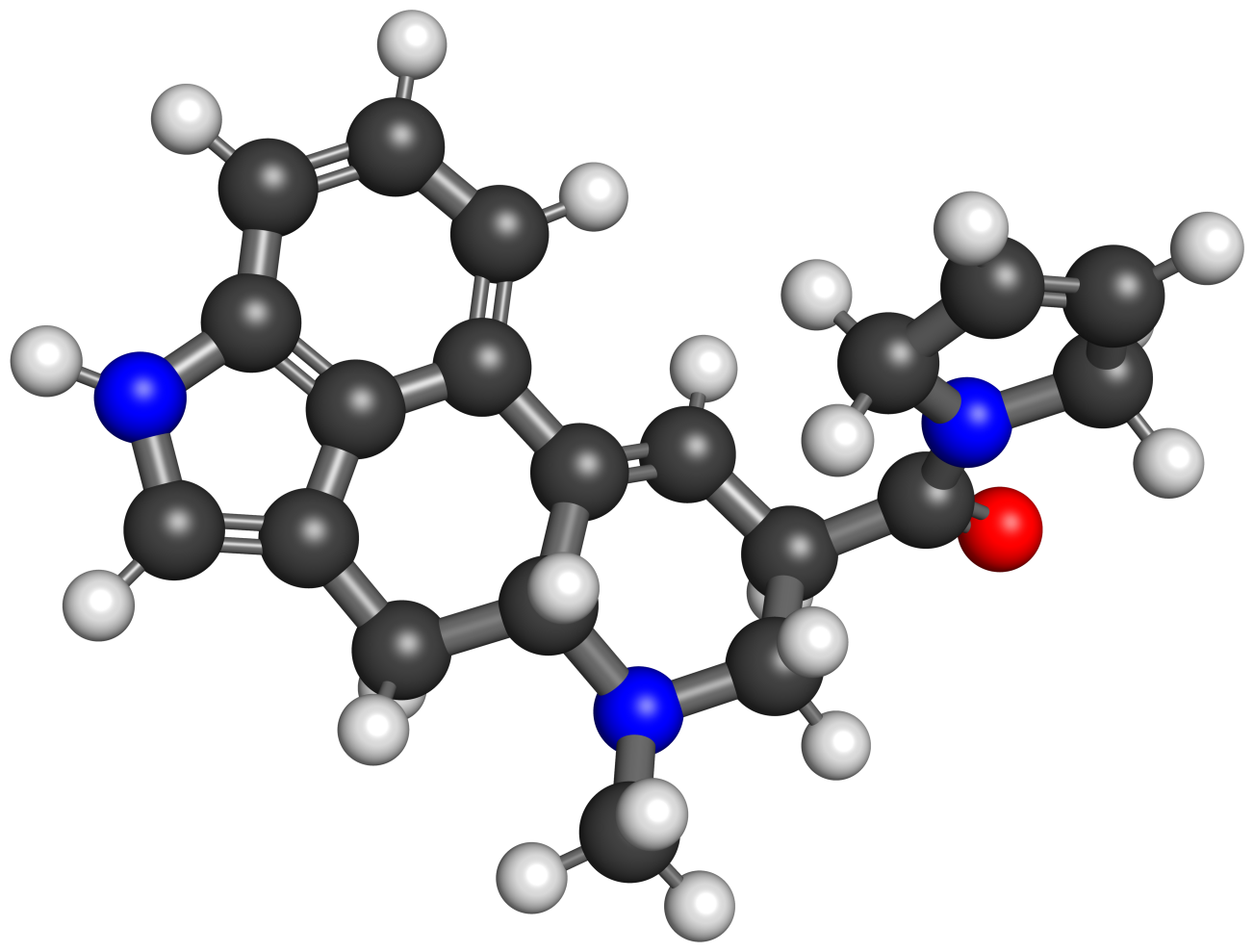

Clinical data
- Other names: Dihydropyrrol lysergamide; LPN; N-(2,5-Dihydro-1H-pyrrolyl)lysergamide; 2,5-Dihydro-1H-pyrrol-1-yl(6-methyl-9,10-didehydroergolin-8β-yl)methanone
- Drug class: Serotonin receptor modulator; Serotonergic psychedelic; Hallucinogen
- ATC code: None

Identifiers
- IUPAC name: (2,5-dihydro-1H-pyrrol-1-yl)[(6aR,9R)-7-methyl-4,6,6a,7,8,9-hexahydroindolo[4,3-fg]quinolin-9-yl]methanone

Chemical and physical data
- Formula: C_{20}H_{21}N_{3}O
- Molar mass: 319.408 g·mol^{−1}
- 3D model (JSmol): Interactive image
- SMILES: CN1C[C@@H](C=C2[C@H]1Cc1c[nH]c3c1c2ccc3)C(=O)N1CC=CC1
- InChI: InChI=1S/C20H21N3O/c1-22-12-14(20(24)23-7-2-3-8-23)9-16-15-5-4-6-17-19(15)13(11-21-17)10-18(16)22/h2-6,9,11,14,18,21H,7-8,10,12H2,1H3/t14-,18-/m1/s1; Key:HCABJTFBYLKAMQ-RDTXWAMCSA-N

Lysergic acid pyrrolinide, also known as dihydropyrrol lysergamide or as N-(2,5-dihydro-1H-pyrrolyl)lysergamide, is a serotonin receptor modulator and possible psychedelic drug of the lysergamide family related to lysergic acid diethylamide (LSD). It is the analogue of LSD in which the N,N-diethylamide moiety has been cyclized into an N-pyrroline ring. The drug is similar in chemical structure to lysergic acid pyrrolidide (LPD-824).

It has 4.1% of the antiserotonergic activity of LSD in the isolated rat uterus and its hallucinogenic activity in humans has not been reported. Unlike the related compounds LPD-824 and LSM-775 (lysergic acid morpholide), lysergic acid pyrrolinide does not appear to have been assessed in humans. Like LPD-824, the drug has greater hypotensive effects than LSD in animals.

Lysergic acid pyrrolinide was first described in the scientific literature by Albert Hofmann and colleagues by 1958.

== See also ==
- Substituted lysergamide
- Lysergic acid pyrrolidide
- Lysergic acid piperidine
- Lysergic acid morpholide
- Lysergic acid azepane (LA-Azepane)
