= LY-53857 =

Clinical data
- Other names: LY53857; LY-53,857; 6-Methyl-1-(1-methylethyl)ergoline-8β-carboxylic acid 2-hydroxy-1-methylpropyl ester
- Drug class: Serotonin 5-HT_{2} receptor antagonist; Serotonin 5-HT_{2A} receptor antagonist; Serotonin 5-HT_{2B} receptor antagonist; Serotonin 5-HT_{2C} receptor antagonist; Serotonin 5-HT_{7} receptor antagonist
- ATC code: None

Identifiers
- IUPAC name: 3-hydroxybutan-2-yl (6aR,9R,10aR)-7-methyl-4-propan-2-yl-6,6a,8,9,10,10a-hexahydroindolo[4,3-fg]quinoline-9-carboxylate
- CAS Number: 32896-53-0
- PubChem CID: 3034814
- ChemSpider: 2299208
- UNII: OK43YC00I7
- ChEMBL: ChEMBL1356280

Chemical and physical data
- Formula: C_{23}H_{32}N_{2}O_{3}
- Molar mass: 384.520 g·mol^{−1}
- 3D model (JSmol): Interactive image
- SMILES: CC(C)N1C=C2C[C@@H]3[C@H](C[C@H](CN3C)C(=O)OC(C)C(C)O)C4=C2C1=CC=C4
- InChI: InChI=1S/C23H32N2O3/c1-13(2)25-12-16-10-21-19(18-7-6-8-20(25)22(16)18)9-17(11-24(21)5)23(27)28-15(4)14(3)26/h6-8,12-15,17,19,21,26H,9-11H2,1-5H3/t14?,15?,17-,19-,21-/m1/s1; Key:JQYLIGHHVGCTPR-LYRPIDSHSA-N

LY-53857 is a serotonin 5-HT_{2} receptor antagonist of the ergoline family which has been widely used in scientific research.

It is a potent antagonist of the serotonin 5-HT_{2A}, 5-HT_{2B}, and 5-HT_{2C} receptors (K_{i} = 7.2–50 nM, 6.3–6.9 nM, and 7.9–8.3 nM, respectively). The drug shows strong selectivity for the serotonin 5-HT_{2} receptors over the serotonin 5-HT_{1} and α-adrenergic receptors. Although originally thought to be selective for the serotonin 5-HT_{2} receptors, LY-53857 was subsequently found to also show significant affinity for the serotonin 5-HT_{7} receptor (K_{i} = 100 nM), where it is likewise an antagonist. In addition, it shows high affinity for the serotonin 5-HT_{1F} receptor (K_{i} = 6.87 nM).

It produces antidepressant-like and anxiolytic-like effects in rodents. The drug has no effect on locomotor activity by itself, but blocks the hyperlocomotion induced by phencyclidine (PCP). In addition, whereas meta-chlorophenylpiperazine (mCPP) produces hypolocomotion by itself, the combination of mCPP with LY-53857 results in mCPP producing hyperlocomotion instead. LY-53857 blocks the discriminative stimulus of the psychedelic drugs LSD, mescaline, and DOM in rodent drug discrimination studies. The drug inhibits the hyperthermia induced by the psychedelic drug DOI, by mCPP, and by the serotonin releasing agent para-chloroamphetamine (PCA).

Analogues of LY-53857 have also been described and include LY-86057 (the N1-desisopropyl analogue), LY-108742 (the N1-methyl analogue), and LY-197541 (the N1-isobutyl analogue).

LY-53857 was first described in the scientific literature by 1979.

== See also ==
- Substituted ergoline
- LY-86057
- Amesergide (LY-237733)
- LY-215840
- Sergolexole (LY-281067)
- LA-3Cl-SB
