= Lisdexamfetamine =

Central nervous system stimulant prodrug

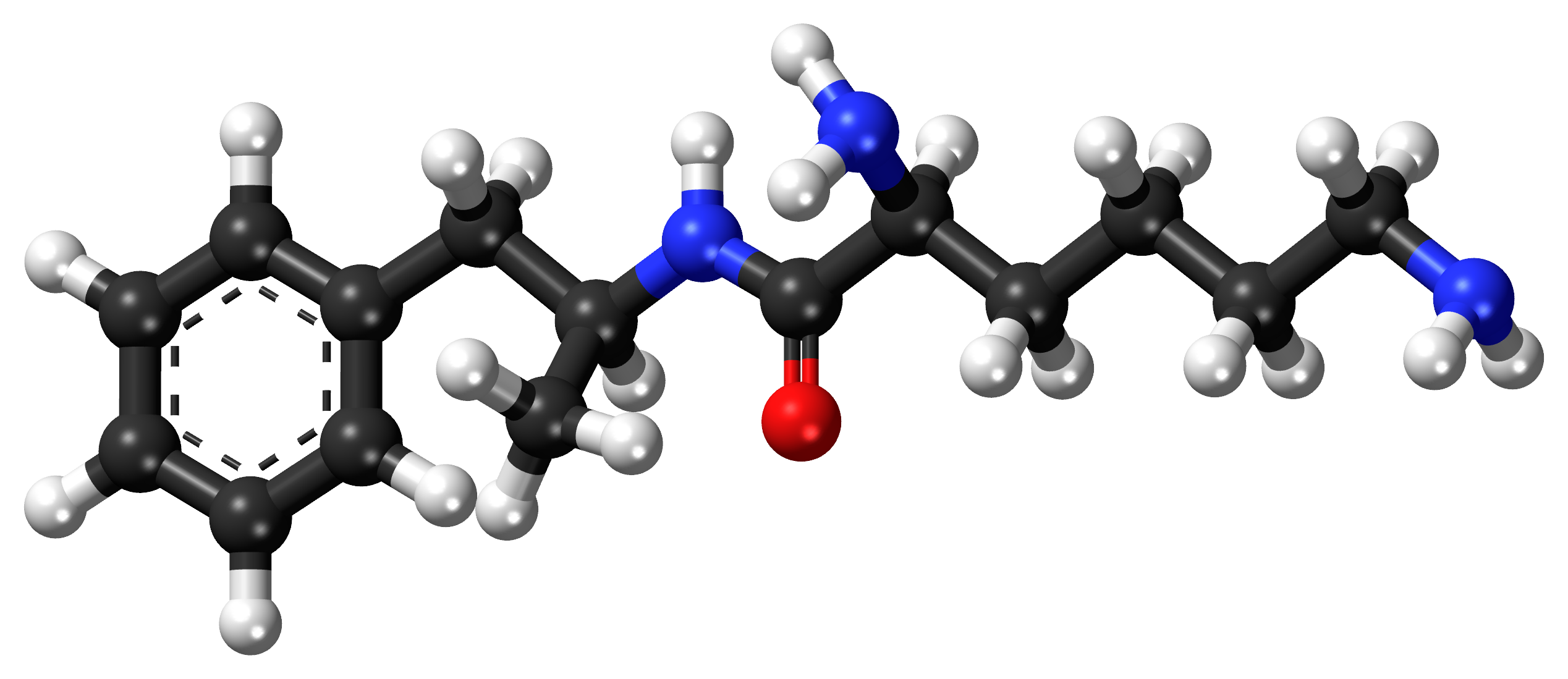

Clinical data
- Trade names: Vyvanse, Elvanse, Tyvense, others
- Other names: Lisdexamphetamine, ʟ-Lysine-d-amphetamine; (2S)-2,6-Diamino-N-[(2S)-1-phenylpropan-2-yl]hexanamide; N-[(2S)-1-Phenyl-2-propanyl]-L-lysinamide
- AHFS/Drugs.com: Monograph
- MedlinePlus: a607047
- License data: US DailyMed: Lisdexamfetamine
- Pregnancy category: AU: B3
- Dependence liability: Physical: None; Psychological: Moderate
- Addiction liability: Moderate
- Routes of administration: Oral
- Drug class: Norepinephrine–dopamine releasing agent; Stimulant
- ATC code: N06BA12 (WHO)

Legal status
- Legal status: AU: S8 (Controlled drug); BR: Class A3 (Psychoactive drugs); CA: Controlled Drug (CDSA I); DE: Anlage III (Special prescription form required); NZ: Class B; UK: Class B; US: Schedule II; EU: Rx-only; SE: Förteckning II; MX: Controlled / Rx-only (Note: Mexican regulatory documentation treats lisdexamfetamine and its salts as subject to sanitary controls applicable to psychotropic substances because lisdexamfetamine is a derivative of dexamphetamine. Medicines containing lisdexamfetamine are classified under Article 226, fraction II of the General Health Law; the prescription is retained by the pharmacy and is valid for 30 days.)

Pharmacokinetic data
- Bioavailability: Oral: 96.4%
- Protein binding: 20% (as dextroamphetamine)
- Metabolism: Hydrolysis by enzymes in red blood cells initially, subsequent metabolism follows
- Metabolites: Dextroamphetamine (and its metabolites) and L-lysine
- Onset of action: Oral: <2 hours
- Elimination half-life: Lisdexamfetamine: <1 hour Dextroamphetamine: 10–12 h
- Duration of action: 10–14 hours
- Excretion: Kidney: ~2% as Lisdexamfetamine and ~42% as Dextroamphetamine

Identifiers
- IUPAC name: (2S)-2,6-diamino-N-[(1S)-1-methyl-2-phenylethyl]hexanamide
- CAS Number: 608137-32-2
- PubChem CID: 11597698
- IUPHAR/BPS: 7213
- DrugBank: DB01255
- ChemSpider: 9772458
- UNII: H645GUL8KJ
- KEGG: D08130; as salt: D04747
- ChEMBL: ChEMBL1201222
- CompTox Dashboard (EPA): DTXSID00209652

Chemical and physical data
- Formula: C_{15}H_{25}N_{3}O
- Molar mass: 263.385 g·mol^{−1}
- 3D model (JSmol): Interactive image
- Chirality: Dextrorotatory enantiomer
- Density: Not routinely reported for solid pharmaceutical salts
- Melting point: Decomposes before a distinct melting point
- Boiling point: Not applicable; decomposes before boiling
- Solubility in water: Freely soluble in water
- SMILES: O=C(N[C@H](Cc1ccccc1)C)[C@@H](N)CCCCN
- InChI: InChI=1S/C15H25N3O/c1-12(11-13-7-3-2-4-8-13)18-15(19)14(17)9-5-6-10-16/h2-4,7-8,12,14H,5-6,9-11,16-17H2,1H3,(H,18,19)/t12-,14-/m0/s1; Key:VOBHXZCDAVEXEY-JSGCOSHPSA-N

Lisdexamfetamine (also known as Lisdexamfetamine Dimesylate), and sold under the brand names Vyvanse (/ˈvaɪ.væns/, VY-vans) and Elvanse among others, is a stimulant medication that is used as a treatment for attention deficit hyperactivity disorder (ADHD) in both children and adults, and for moderate-to-severe binge eating disorder in adults. A prodrug of dextroamphetamine, lisdexamfetamine is taken by mouth. Its effects generally begin within 90 minutes and last for up to 14 hours.

Common side effects of lisdexamfetamine include hypertension, loss of appetite, anxiety, diarrhea, trouble sleeping, irritability, and nausea. Rare but serious side effects include mania, sudden cardiac death in those with underlying heart problems, and psychosis. It has a high potential for substance abuse. Serotonin syndrome may occur if used with certain other medications. Its use during pregnancy may result in harm to the fetus, and use during breastfeeding is not recommended by the manufacturer as dextroamphetamine (its metabolite) can pass through the breastmilk.

Lisdexamfetamine is an inactive prodrug that is formed by the condensation of L-lysine, a naturally occurring amino acid, and dextroamphetamine. In the blood, peptidase enzymes reverse this process to release the active agent, the central nervous system (CNS) stimulant dextroamphetamine.

Lisdexamfetamine was approved for medical use in the United States in 2007 and in the European Union in 2012. In 2023, it was the 76th most commonly prescribed medication in the United States, with more than 9 million prescriptions. It is a Class B controlled substance in the United Kingdom, a Schedule 8 controlled drug in Australia, and a Schedule II controlled substance in the United States.

== Uses ==
=== Medical ===
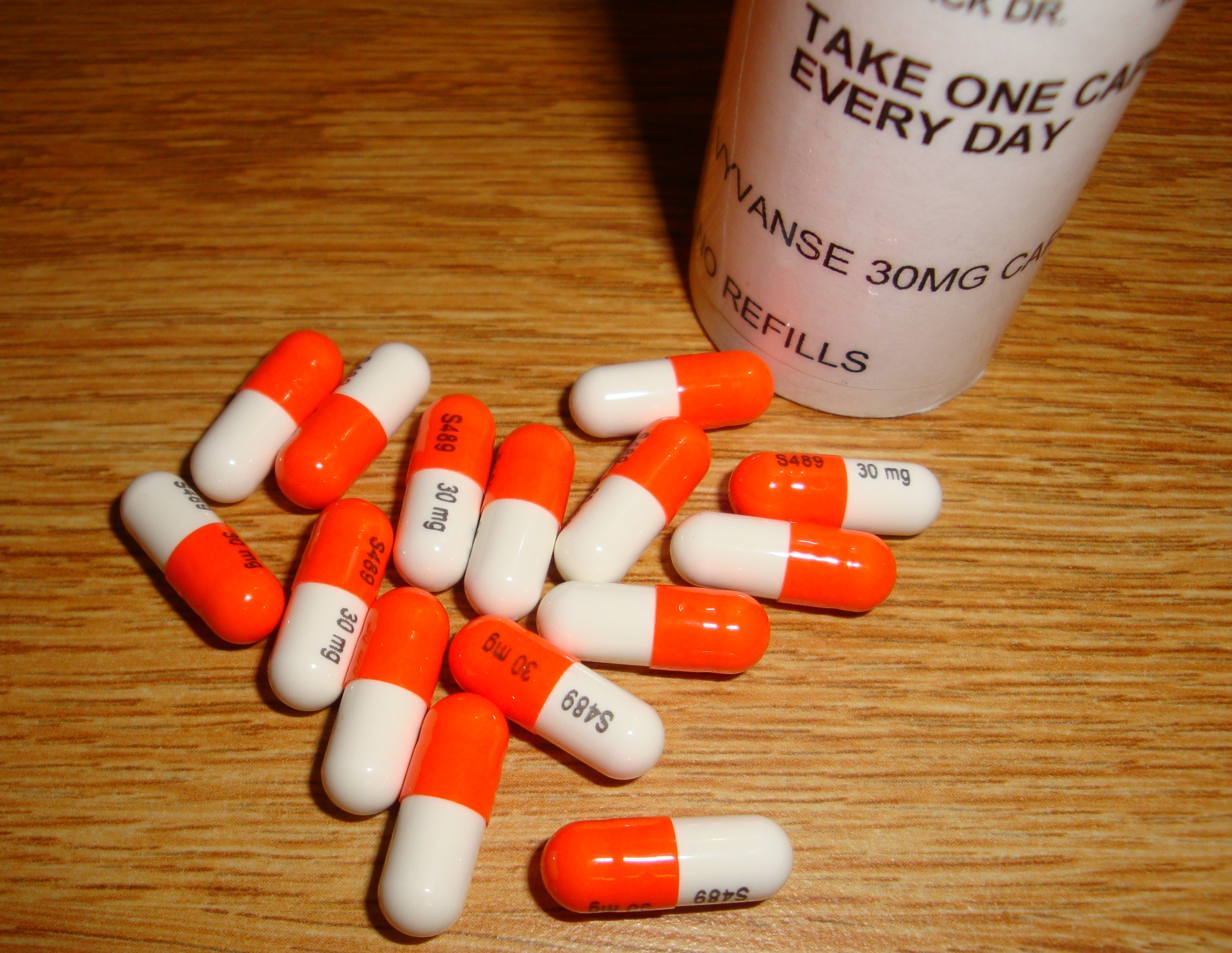
30 mg Vyvanse capsules

Lisdexamfetamine is used primarily as a treatment for attention deficit hyperactivity disorder (ADHD) and binge eating disorder. It has similar off-label uses as those of other pharmaceutical amphetamines, such as the treatment of narcolepsy. Individuals over the age of 65 were not commonly tested in clinical trials of lisdexamfetamine for ADHD. According to a 2019 systematic review, lisdexamfetamine was the most effective treatment for adult ADHD.

==== ADHD ====
Long-term amphetamine exposure at sufficiently high doses in some animal species is known to produce abnormal dopamine system development or nerve damage, but, in humans with ADHD, long-term use of pharmaceutical amphetamines at therapeutic doses appears to improve brain development and nerve growth. Reviews of magnetic resonance imaging (MRI) studies suggest that long-term treatment with amphetamine decreases abnormalities in brain structure and function found in subjects with ADHD, and improves function in several parts of the brain, such as the right caudate nucleus of the basal ganglia.

Reviews of clinical stimulant research have established the safety and effectiveness of long-term continuous amphetamine use for the treatment of ADHD. Randomized controlled trials of continuous stimulant therapy for the treatment of ADHD spanning 2 years have demonstrated treatment effectiveness and safety. Two reviews have indicated that long-term continuous stimulant therapy for ADHD is effective for reducing the core symptoms of ADHD (i.e., hyperactivity, inattention, and impulsivity), enhancing quality of life and academic achievement, and producing improvements in a large number of functional outcomes (Note: The ADHD-related outcome domains with the greatest proportion of significantly improved outcomes from long-term continuous stimulant therapy include academics (≈55% of academic outcomes improved), driving (100% of driving outcomes improved), non-medical drug use (47% of addiction-related outcomes improved), obesity (≈65% of obesity-related outcomes improved), self-esteem (50% of self-esteem outcomes improved), and social function (67% of social function outcomes improved). The largest effect sizes for outcome improvements from long-term stimulant therapy occur in the domains involving academics (e.g., grade point average, achievement test scores, length of education, and education level), self-esteem (e.g., self-esteem questionnaire assessments, number of suicide attempts, and suicide rates), and social function (e.g., peer nomination scores, social skills, and quality of peer, family, and romantic relationships). Long-term combination therapy for ADHD (i.e., treatment with both a stimulant and behavioral therapy) produces even larger effect sizes for outcome improvements and improves a larger proportion of outcomes across each domain compared to long-term stimulant therapy alone. These findings were further supported by a 2025 review of interventions for adolescents, which concluded that medications and cognitive-behavioral treatments (CBT) provide complementary benefits. Medications demonstrated strong short-term efficacy on core symptoms, while CBT contributed modest to strong, and sometimes long-lasting, improvements in functional impairments and executive skills when used as part of combination therapy.) across 9 categories of outcomes related to academics, antisocial behavior, driving, non-medicinal drug use, obesity, occupation, self-esteem, service use (i.e., academic, occupational, health, financial, and legal services), and social function. Additionally, a 2024 meta-analytic systematic review reported moderate improvements in quality of life when amphetamine treatment is used for ADHD. One review highlighted a nine-month randomized controlled trial of amphetamine treatment for ADHD in children that found an average increase of 4.5 IQ points, continued increases in attention, and continued decreases in disruptive behaviors and hyperactivity. Another review indicated that, based upon the longest follow-up studies conducted to date, lifetime stimulant therapy that begins during childhood is continuously effective for controlling ADHD symptoms and reduces the risk of developing a substance use disorder as an adult.

Models of ADHD suggest that it is associated with functional impairments in some of the brain's neurotransmitter systems; these functional impairments involve impaired dopamine neurotransmission in the mesocorticolimbic projection and norepinephrine neurotransmission in the noradrenergic projections from the locus coeruleus to the prefrontal cortex. Stimulants like methylphenidate and amphetamine are effective in treating ADHD because they increase neurotransmitter activity in these systems. Approximately 80% of those who use these stimulants see improvements in ADHD symptoms. Children with ADHD who use stimulant medications generally have better relationships with peers and family members, perform better in school, are less distractible and impulsive, and have longer attention spans. The Cochrane reviews (Note: Cochrane reviews are high quality meta-analytic systematic reviews of randomized controlled trials.) on the treatment of ADHD in children, adolescents, and adults with pharmaceutical amphetamines stated that short-term studies have demonstrated that these drugs decrease the severity of symptoms, but they have higher discontinuation rates than non-stimulant medications due to their adverse side effects. However, a 2025 meta-analytic systematic review of 113 randomized controlled trials found that stimulant medications were the only intervention with robust short-term efficacy, and were associated with lower all-cause treatment discontinuation rates than non-stimulant medications (e.g., atomoxetine). (Note: In contrast to the Cochrane reviews that observed higher treatment discontinuation from adverse effects alone, this figure represents any cause of discontinuation (e.g., insufficient perceived treatment benefit).) A Cochrane review on the treatment of ADHD in children with tic disorders such as Tourette syndrome indicated that stimulants in general do not make tics worse, but high doses of dextroamphetamine could exacerbate tics in some individuals.

==== Binge eating disorder ====
Binge eating disorder (BED) is characterized by recurrent and persistent episodes of compulsive binge eating. These episodes are often accompanied by marked distress and a feeling of loss of control over eating. The pathophysiology of BED is not fully understood, but it is believed to involve dysfunctional dopaminergic reward circuitry along the cortico-striatal-thalamic-cortical loop. As of July 2024, lisdexamfetamine is the only FDA- and TGA-approved pharmacotherapy for BED. Evidence suggests that lisdexamfetamine's treatment efficacy in BED is underpinned at least in part by a psychopathological overlap between BED and ADHD, with the latter conceptualized as a cognitive control disorder that also benefits from treatment with lisdexamfetamine.

Lisdexamfetamine's therapeutic effects for BED primarily involve direct action in the central nervous system after conversion to its pharmacologically active metabolite, dextroamphetamine. Dextroamphetamine increases dopaminergic and noradrenergic neurotransmission in prefrontal cortex, a region of the brain that regulates cognitive control of behavior. Similar to its therapeutic effect in ADHD, dextroamphetamine enhances cognitive control and may reduce impulsivity in patients with BED by enhancing the cognitive processes responsible for overriding prepotent feeding responses that precede binge eating episodes. Dextroamphetamine is also a full agonist of trace amine-associated receptor 1 (TAAR1), a G-protein coupled receptor that regulates monoaminergic systems in the brain; activation of TAAR1 may restore impaired dopaminergic signaling in the prefrontal cortex and thereby correct deficits in inhibitory control associated with binge eating behaviors. Alongside its effect on cognitive control, appetite suppression is a common side effect of lisdexamfetamine and is associated with reduced food intake. Amphetamines are believed to dampen the sensation of hunger through actions in the lateral hypothalamus; this is thought to involve increased catecholaminergic signaling and the induction of cocaine- and amphetamine-regulated transcript (CART), a hypothalamic neuropeptide involved the regulation of food intake. While appetite suppression may influence the magnitude of reductions in food intake, three medical reviews indicate that lisdexamfetamine's enhancement of cognitive control is the primary therapeutic effect for reducing binge-eating symptoms and is likely required for addressing the disorder's underlying psychopathology. This view is supported by the failure of anti-obesity medications and other appetite suppressants to significantly reduce BED symptom severity, despite their ability to produce weight loss.

Medical reviews of randomized controlled trials have demonstrated that lisdexamfetamine, at doses between 50 and 70 mg, is safe and effective for the treatment of moderate-to-severe BED in adults. These reviews suggest that lisdexamfetamine is persistently effective at treating BED and is associated with significant reductions in the number of binge eating days and binge eating episodes per week. Furthermore, a meta-analytic systematic review highlighted an open-label, 12-month extension safety and tolerability study that reported lisdexamfetamine remained effective at reducing the number of binge eating days for the duration of the study. In addition, both a review and a meta-analytic systematic review found lisdexamfetamine to be superior to placebo in several secondary outcome measures, including persistent binge eating cessation, reduction of obsessive-compulsive related binge eating symptoms, reduction of body-weight, and reduction of triglycerides. Lisdexamfetamine, like all pharmaceutical amphetamines, has direct appetite suppressant effects that may be therapeutically useful in both BED and its comorbidities. Based on reviews of neuroimaging studies involving BED-diagnosed participants, therapeutic neuroplasticity in dopaminergic and noradrenergic pathways from long-term use of lisdexamfetamine may be implicated in lasting improvements in the regulation of eating behaviors that are observed.

==== Narcolepsy ====
Narcolepsy is a chronic sleep-wake disorder that is associated with excessive daytime sleepiness, cataplexy, and sleep paralysis. Patients with narcolepsy are diagnosed as either type 1 or type 2, with only the former presenting cataplexy symptoms. Type 1 narcolepsy results from the loss of approximately 70,000 orexin-releasing neurons in the lateral hypothalamus, leading to significantly reduced cerebrospinal orexin levels; this reduction is a diagnostic biomarker for type 1 narcolepsy. Lateral hypothalamic orexin neurons innervate every component of the ascending reticular activating system (ARAS), which includes noradrenergic, dopaminergic, histaminergic, and serotonergic nuclei that promote wakefulness.

Amphetamine's therapeutic mode of action in narcolepsy primarily involves increasing monoamine neurotransmitter activity in the ARAS. This includes noradrenergic neurons in the locus coeruleus, dopaminergic neurons in the ventral tegmental area, histaminergic neurons in the tuberomammillary nucleus, and serotonergic neurons in the dorsal raphe nucleus. Dextroamphetamine, the more dopaminergic enantiomer of amphetamine, is particularly effective at promoting wakefulness because dopamine release has the greatest influence on cortical activation and cognitive arousal, relative to other monoamines. In contrast, levoamphetamine may have a greater effect on cataplexy, a symptom more sensitive to the effects of norepinephrine and serotonin. Noradrenergic and serotonergic nuclei in the ARAS are involved in the regulation of the REM sleep cycle and function as "REM-off" cells, with amphetamine's effect on norepinephrine and serotonin contributing to the suppression of REM sleep and a possible reduction of cataplexy at high doses.

The American Academy of Sleep Medicine (AASM) 2021 clinical practice guideline conditionally recommends dextroamphetamine for the treatment of both type 1 and type 2 narcolepsy. Treatment with pharmaceutical amphetamines is generally less preferred relative to other stimulants (e.g., modafinil) and is considered a third-line treatment option. Medical reviews indicate that amphetamine is safe and effective for the treatment of narcolepsy. Amphetamine appears to be most effective at improving symptoms associated with hypersomnolence, with three reviews finding clinically significant reductions in daytime sleepiness in patients with narcolepsy. Additionally, these reviews suggest that amphetamine may dose-dependently improve cataplexy symptoms. However, the quality of evidence for these findings is low and is consequently reflected in the AASM's conditional recommendation for dextroamphetamine as a treatment option for narcolepsy.

=== Enhancing performance ===
==== Cognitive performance ====
In 2015, a systematic review and a meta-analysis of high quality clinical trials found that, when used at low (therapeutic) doses, amphetamine produces modest yet unambiguous improvements in cognition, including working memory, long-term episodic memory, inhibitory control, and some aspects of attention, in normal healthy adults; these cognition-enhancing effects of amphetamine are known to be partially mediated through the indirect activation of both dopamine D_{1} receptor and α_{2}-adrenergic receptor in the prefrontal cortex. A systematic review from 2014 found that low doses of amphetamine also improve memory consolidation, in turn leading to improved recall of information. Therapeutic doses of amphetamine also enhance cortical network efficiency, an effect which mediates improvements in working memory in all individuals. Amphetamine and other ADHD stimulants also improve task saliency (motivation to perform a task) and increase arousal (wakefulness), in turn promoting goal-directed behavior. Stimulants such as amphetamine can improve performance on difficult and boring tasks and are used by some students as a study and test-taking aid. Based upon studies of self-reported illicit stimulant use, 5–35% of college students use diverted ADHD stimulants, which are primarily used for enhancement of academic performance rather than as recreational drugs. However, high amphetamine doses that are above the therapeutic range can interfere with working memory and other aspects of cognitive control.

==== Physical performance ====
Amphetamine is used by some athletes for its psychological and athletic performance-enhancing effects, such as increased endurance and alertness; however, non-medical amphetamine use is prohibited at sporting events that are regulated by collegiate, national, and international anti-doping agencies. In healthy people at oral therapeutic doses, amphetamine has been shown to increase muscle strength, acceleration, athletic performance in anaerobic conditions, and endurance (i.e., it delays the onset of fatigue), while improving reaction time. Amphetamine improves endurance and reaction time primarily through reuptake inhibition and release of dopamine in the central nervous system. Amphetamine and other dopaminergic drugs also increase power output at fixed levels of perceived exertion by overriding a "safety switch", allowing the core temperature limit to increase in order to access a reserve capacity that is normally off-limits. At therapeutic doses, the adverse effects of amphetamine do not impede athletic performance; however, at much higher doses, amphetamine can induce effects that severely impair performance, such as rapid muscle breakdown and elevated body temperature.

=== Available forms ===
Lisdexamfetamine is available as the dimesylate salt in the form of both oral capsules and chewable tablets. A dose of 50 mg of lisdexamfetamine dimesylate is approximately equimolar to a 20 mg dose of dextroamphetamine sulfate or to 15 mg dextroamphetamine free-base in terms of the amount of dextroamphetamine contained. Lisdexamfetamine capsules can be swallowed intact, or they can be opened and mixed into water, yogurt, or applesauce and consumed in that manner.

== Contraindications ==
Pharmaceutical lisdexamfetamine is contraindicated in people with hypersensitivity to amphetamine products or any of the formulation's inactive ingredients. It is also contraindicated in patients who have used a monoamine oxidase inhibitor (MAOI) within the last 14 days. Amphetamine products are contraindicated by the United States Food and Drug Administration (USFDA) in people with a history of drug abuse, heart disease, or severe agitation or anxiety, or in those currently experiencing arteriosclerosis, glaucoma, hyperthyroidism, or severe hypertension. However, a European consensus statement on adult ADHD noted that stimulants do not worsen substance misuse in adults with ADHD and comorbid substance use disorder and should not be avoided in these individuals. In any case, the statement noted that immediate-release stimulants should be avoided in those with both ADHD and substance use disorder and that slower-release stimulant formulations like OROS methylphenidate (Concerta) and lisdexamfetamine should be preferred due to their lower misuse potential. Prescribing information approved by the Australian Therapeutic Goods Administration further contraindicates anorexia.

== Adverse effects ==
Products containing lisdexamfetamine have a comparable drug safety profile to those containing amphetamine. The major side effects of lisdexamfetamine in short-term clinical trials (≥5% incidence) have included decreased appetite, insomnia, dry mouth, weight loss, irritability, upper abdominal pain, nausea, vomiting, diarrhea, constipation, increased heart rate, anxiety, dizziness, and feeling jittery. Rates of side effects may vary in adults, adolescents, and children. Rare but serious side effects of lisdexamfetamine may include mania, sudden cardiac death in those with underlying heart problems, stimulant psychosis, and serotonin syndrome.

== Interactions ==
- Acidifying agents: Drugs or foods that acidify the urine, such as ascorbic acid, increase urinary excretion of dextroamphetamine, thus decreasing the half-life and effectiveness of dextroamphetamine in the body.
- Alkalinizing agents: Drugs or foods that alkalinize the urine, such as sodium bicarbonate, decrease urinary excretion of dextroamphetamine, thus increasing the half-life and effectiveness of dextroamphetamine in the body.
- CYP2D6 inhibitors: Hydroxylation via the cytochrome P450 enzyme CYP2D6 is the major pathway of metabolism of dextroamphetamine. Potent CYP2D6 inhibitors, such as paroxetine, fluoxetine, bupropion, and duloxetine, among others, may inhibit the metabolism of dextroamphetamine and thereby increase exposure to it. Studies characterizing this potential interaction are currently lacking. Concomitant use of lisdexamfetamine with CYP2D6 inhibitors may increase the risk of serotonin syndrome due to greater drug exposure.
- Monoamine oxidase inhibitors: Concomitant use of MAOIs and central nervous system stimulants such as lisdexamfetamine can cause a hypertensive crisis.
- Norepinephrine reuptake inhibitors (NRIs) like atomoxetine prevent norepinephrine release induced by amphetamines and have been found to reduce the stimulant, euphoriant, and sympathomimetic effects of dextroamphetamine in humans.

== Pharmacology ==
=== Mechanism of action ===
Pharmacodynamics of amphetamine in a dopamine neuron
Amphetamine enters the presynaptic neuron across the neuronal membrane or through DAT. Once inside, it binds to TAAR1 or enters synaptic vesicles through VMAT2. When amphetamine enters synaptic vesicles through VMAT2, it collapses the vesicular pH gradient, which in turn causes dopamine to be released into the cytosol (light tan-colored area) through VMAT2. When amphetamine binds to TAAR1, it reduces the firing rate of the dopamine neuron via G protein-coupled inwardly rectifying potassium channels (GIRKs) and activates protein kinase A (PKA) and protein kinase C (PKC), which subsequently phosphorylate DAT. PKA phosphorylation causes DAT to withdraw into the presynaptic neuron (internalize) and cease transport. PKC-phosphorylated DAT may either operate in reverse or, like PKA-phosphorylated DAT, internalize and cease transport. Amphetamine is also known to increase intracellular calcium, an effect which is associated with DAT phosphorylation through a CAMKIIα-dependent pathway, in turn producing dopamine efflux.

Lisdexamfetamine is an inactive prodrug that is converted in the body to dextroamphetamine, a pharmacologically active compound that is responsible for the drug's activity. After oral ingestion, lisdexamfetamine is broken down by enzymes in red blood cells to form L-lysine, a naturally occurring essential amino acid, and dextroamphetamine. The half-life of this conversion is roughly 1 hour. The conversion of lisdexamfetamine to dextroamphetamine is not affected by gastrointestinal pH and is unlikely to be affected by alterations in normal gastrointestinal transit times. Studies show a linear relationship between peak plasma concentration of dextroamphetamine and lisdexamfetamine dose up to lisdexamfetamine doses of 250 mg.

The optical isomers of amphetamine, i.e., dextroamphetamine and levoamphetamine, are TAAR1 agonists and vesicular monoamine transporter 2 inhibitors that can enter monoamine neurons; this allows them to release monoamine neurotransmitters (dopamine, norepinephrine, and serotonin, among others) from their storage sites in the presynaptic neuron, as well as prevent the reuptake of these neurotransmitters from the synaptic cleft.

Lisdexamfetamine was developed to provide a long-duration effect that is consistent throughout the day, with reduced potential for abuse. The attachment of the amino acid lysine slows down the relative amount of dextroamphetamine available in the bloodstream. Because no free dextroamphetamine is present in lisdexamfetamine capsules, dextroamphetamine does not become available through mechanical manipulation, such as crushing or simple extraction. Lisdexamfetamine is a single-enantiomer dextroamphetamine formula similar to Dexedrine but opposed to other amphetamine based pharmaceuticals such as Adderall, which contains both dextroamphetamine and levoamphetamine at a 3:1 ratio, or racemic mixtures like Evekeo and the presently discontinued Benzedrine which are amphetamine salts with a 1:1 enantiomer ratio. Studies conducted show that lisdexamfetamine may have less abuse potential than dextroamphetamine and an abuse profile similar to diethylpropion at dosages that are FDA-approved for treatment of ADHD, but still has a high abuse potential when this dosage is exceeded by over 100%.

=== Pharmacokinetics ===
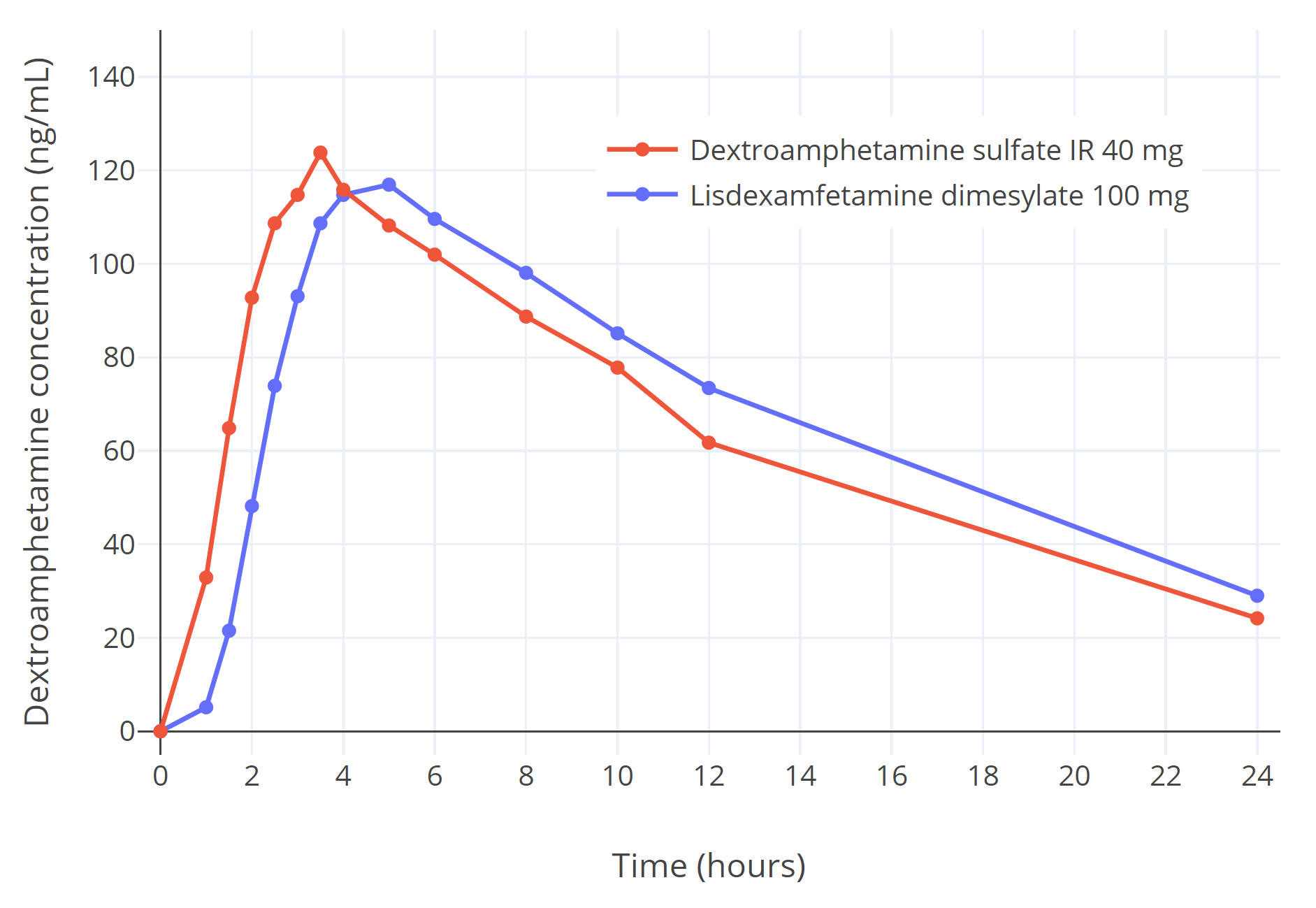
Dextroamphetamine concentrations after oral administration of a single equimolar dose of dextroamphetamine sulfate immediate-release (IR) (40 mg; equivalent to 30 mg dextroamphetamine free-base) and lisdexamfetamine dimesylate (100 mg) in healthy adults. C_{max}, t_{1/2}, and AUC_{∞} were all similar between the two drugs, while t_{lag} (1.5 hours vs. 0.8 hours) and t_{max} (4.6 hours vs. 3.3 hours) were longer for lisdexamfetamine than with dextroamphetamine.

The oral bioavailability of amphetamine varies with gastrointestinal pH; it is well absorbed from the gut, and bioavailability is typically 90%. Amphetamine is a weak base with a pK_{a} of 9.9; consequently, when the pH is basic, more of the drug is in its lipid soluble free base form, and more is absorbed through the lipid-rich cell membranes of the gut epithelium. Conversely, an acidic pH means the drug is predominantly in a water-soluble cationic (salt) form, and less is absorbed. Between 16-20% of amphetamine circulating in the bloodstream is bound to plasma proteins. Following absorption, amphetamine readily distributes into most tissues in the body, with high concentrations occurring in cerebrospinal fluid and brain tissue.

The half-lives of amphetamine enantiomers differ and vary with urine pH. At normal urine pH, the half-lives of dextroamphetamine and levoamphetamine are 9–11 hours and 11–14 hours, respectively. Highly acidic urine will reduce the enantiomer half-lives to 7 hours; highly alkaline urine will increase the half-lives up to 34 hours. The immediate-release and extended release variants of salts of both isomers reach peak plasma concentrations at 3 hours and 7 hours post-dose respectively. Amphetamine is eliminated via the kidneys, with 30–40% of the drug being excreted unchanged at normal urinary pH. When the urinary pH is basic, amphetamine is in its free base form, so less is excreted. When urine pH is abnormal, the urinary recovery of amphetamine may range from a low of 1% to a high of 75%, depending mostly upon whether urine is too basic or acidic, respectively. Following oral administration, amphetamine appears in urine within 3 hours. Roughly 90% of ingested amphetamine is eliminated 3 days after the last oral dose.

Lisdexamfetamine is a prodrug of dextroamphetamine. It is not as sensitive to pH as amphetamine when being absorbed in the gastrointestinal tract. Following absorption into the blood stream, lisdexamfetamine is completely converted by red blood cells to dextroamphetamine and the amino acid L-lysine by hydrolysis via undetermined aminopeptidase enzymes. This is the rate-limiting step in the bioactivation of lisdexamfetamine. The elimination half-life of lisdexamfetamine is generally less than 1 hour. Due to the necessary conversion of lisdexamfetamine into dextroamphetamine, levels of dextroamphetamine with lisdexamfetamine peak about one hour later than with an equivalent dose of immediate-release dextroamphetamine. Presumably due to its rate-limited activation by red blood cells, intravenous administration of lisdexamfetamine shows greatly delayed time to peak and reduced peak levels compared to intravenous administration of an equivalent dose of dextroamphetamine. The pharmacokinetics of lisdexamfetamine are similar regardless of whether it is administered orally, intranasally, or intravenously. Hence, in contrast to dextroamphetamine, parenteral use does not enhance the subjective effects of lisdexamfetamine. Because of its behavior as a prodrug and its pharmacokinetic differences, lisdexamfetamine has a longer duration of therapeutic effect than immediate-release dextroamphetamine and shows reduced misuse potential.

CYP2D6, dopamine β-hydroxylase (DBH), flavin-containing monooxygenase 3 (FMO3), butyrate-CoA ligase (XM-ligase), and glycine N-acyltransferase (GLYAT) are the enzymes known to metabolize amphetamine or its metabolites in humans. Amphetamine has a variety of excreted metabolic products, including 4-hydroxyamphetamine, 4-hydroxynorephedrine, 4-hydroxyphenylacetone, N-hydroxyamphetamine, benzoic acid, hippuric acid, norephedrine, and phenylacetone. Among these metabolites, the active sympathomimetics are 4-hydroxyamphetamine, 4-hydroxynorephedrine, norephedrine, and N-hydroxyamphetamine. The main metabolic pathways involve aromatic para-hydroxylation, aliphatic alpha- and beta-hydroxylation, N-oxidation, N-dealkylation, and deamination. The known metabolic pathways, detectable metabolites, and metabolizing enzymes in humans include the following:

Metabolic pathways of amphetamine in humans
The primary active metabolites of amphetamine are 4-hydroxyamphetamine and norephedrine; at normal urine pH, about 30–40% of amphetamine is excreted unchanged and roughly 50% is excreted as the inactive metabolites (bottom row). The remaining 10–20% is excreted as the active metabolites. Benzoic acid is metabolized by XM-ligase into an intermediate product, benzoyl-CoA, which is then metabolized by GLYAT into hippuric acid.

== Chemistry ==
Lisdexamfetamine is a substituted amphetamine with an amide linkage formed by the condensation of dextroamphetamine with the carboxylate group of the essential amino acid L-lysine. The reaction occurs with retention of stereochemistry, so the product lisdexamfetamine exists as a single stereoisomer. There are many possible names for lisdexamfetamine based on IUPAC nomenclature, but it is usually named as N-[(2S)-1-phenyl-2-propanyl]-L-lysinamide or (2S)-2,6-diamino-N-[(1S)-1-methyl-2-phenylethyl]hexanamide. The condensation reaction occurs with loss of water:

(S)-PhCH_{2}CH(CH_{3})NH_{2} + (S)-HOOCCH(NH_{2})CH_{2}CH_{2}CH_{2}CH_{2}NH_{2} → (S,S)-PhCH_{2}CH(CH_{3})NHC(O)CH(NH_{2})CH_{2}CH_{2}CH_{2}CH_{2}NH_{2} + H_{2}O

Amine functional groups are vulnerable to oxidation in air and so pharmaceuticals containing them are usually formulated as salts where this moiety has been protonated. This increases stability, water solubility, and, by converting a molecular compound to an ionic compound, increases the melting point and thereby ensures a solid product. In the case of lisdexamfetamine, this is achieved by reacting with two equivalents of methanesulfonic acid to produce the dimesylate salt, a water-soluble (792 mg mL^{−1}) powder with a white to off-white color.

PhCH_{2}CH(CH_{3})NHC(O)CH(NH_{2})CH_{2}CH_{2}CH_{2}CH_{2}NH_{2} + 2 CH_{3}SO_{3}H → [PhCH_{2}CH(CH_{3})NHC(O)CH(NH^{+}_{3})CH_{2}CH_{2}CH_{2}CH_{2}NH^{+}_{3}][CH_{3}SO^{−}_{3}]_{2}

=== Comparison to other formulations ===
Lisdexamfetamine dimesylate is one marketed formulation delivering dextroamphetamine.The following table compares the drug to other amphetamine pharmaceuticals.

Amphetamine base in marketed amphetamine medications
drug		formula	molar mass (Note: For uniformity, molar masses were calculated using the Lenntech Molecular Weight Calculator and were within 0.01 g/mol of published pharmaceutical values.)		amphetamine base (Note: Amphetamine base percentage = molecular mass_{base} / molecular mass_{total}. Amphetamine base percentage for Adderall = sum of component percentages / 4.)			amphetamine base in equal doses		doses with equal base content (Note: dose = (1 / amphetamine base percentage) × scaling factor = (molecular mass_{total} / molecular mass_{base}) × scaling factor. The values in this column were scaled to a 30 mg dose of dextroamphetamine sulfate. Due to pharmacological differences between these medications (e.g., differences in the release, absorption, conversion, concentration, differing effects of enantiomers, half-life, etc.), the listed values should not be considered equipotent doses.)
drug		formula	(g/mol)		(percent)			(30 mg dose)		doses with equal base content
drug		formula	total	base	total	dextro-	levo-	dextro-	levo-	doses with equal base content
dextroamphetamine sulfate		(C_{9}H_{13}N)_{2}•H_{2}SO_{4}	368.49	270.41	73.38%	73.38%	—	22.0 mg	—	30.0 mg
amphetamine sulfate		(C_{9}H_{13}N)_{2}•H_{2}SO_{4}	368.49	270.41	73.38%	36.69%	36.69%	11.0 mg	11.0 mg	30.0 mg
Adderall					62.57%	47.49%	15.08%	14.2 mg	4.5 mg	35.2 mg
25%	dextroamphetamine sulfate	(C_{9}H_{13}N)_{2}•H_{2}SO_{4}	368.49	270.41	73.38%	73.38%	—			
25%	amphetamine sulfate	(C_{9}H_{13}N)_{2}•H_{2}SO_{4}	368.49	270.41	73.38%	36.69%	36.69%			
25%	dextroamphetamine saccharate	(C_{9}H_{13}N)_{2}•C_{6}H_{10}O_{8}	480.55	270.41	56.27%	56.27%	—			
25%	amphetamine aspartate monohydrate	(C_{9}H_{13}N)•C_{4}H_{7}NO_{4}•H_{2}O	286.32	135.21	47.22%	23.61%	23.61%			
lisdexamfetamine dimesylate		C_{15}H_{25}N_{3}O•(CH_{4}O_{3}S)_{2}	455.49	135.21	29.68%	29.68%	—	8.9 mg	—	74.2 mg
amphetamine base suspension		C_{9}H_{13}N	135.21	135.21	100%	76.19%	23.81%	22.9 mg	7.1 mg	22.0 mg

=== Analogues ===
Analogues of lisdexamfetamine include lomardexamfetamine, lys-MDA, and lys-MDMA, among others.

== History ==
Lisdexamfetamine was developed by Robert Oberlender at New River Pharmaceuticals, under the name NRP104, before being bought by Takeda Pharmaceuticals through its acquisition of Shire Pharmaceuticals, prior to market release. It was developed to create a longer-lasting and less-easily abused version of dextroamphetamine, as the requirement of conversion into dextroamphetamine via enzymes in the red blood cells delays its onset of action, regardless of the route of administration.

In February 2007, the US Food and Drug Administration (FDA) approved lisdexamfetamine for the treatment of ADHD. In August 2009, Health Canada approved the marketing of lisdexamfetamine for prescription use.

In January 2015, lisdexamfetamine was approved by the FDA for the treatment of binge eating disorder in adults.

The FDA gave tentative approval to generic formulations of lisdexamfetamine in 2015. The expiration date for patent protection of lisdexamfetamine in the US was 24 February 2023. The Canadian patent expired 20 years from the filing date of 1 June 2004.

Production quotas for 2016 in the United States were 29,750 kg.

== Society and culture ==
=== Name ===
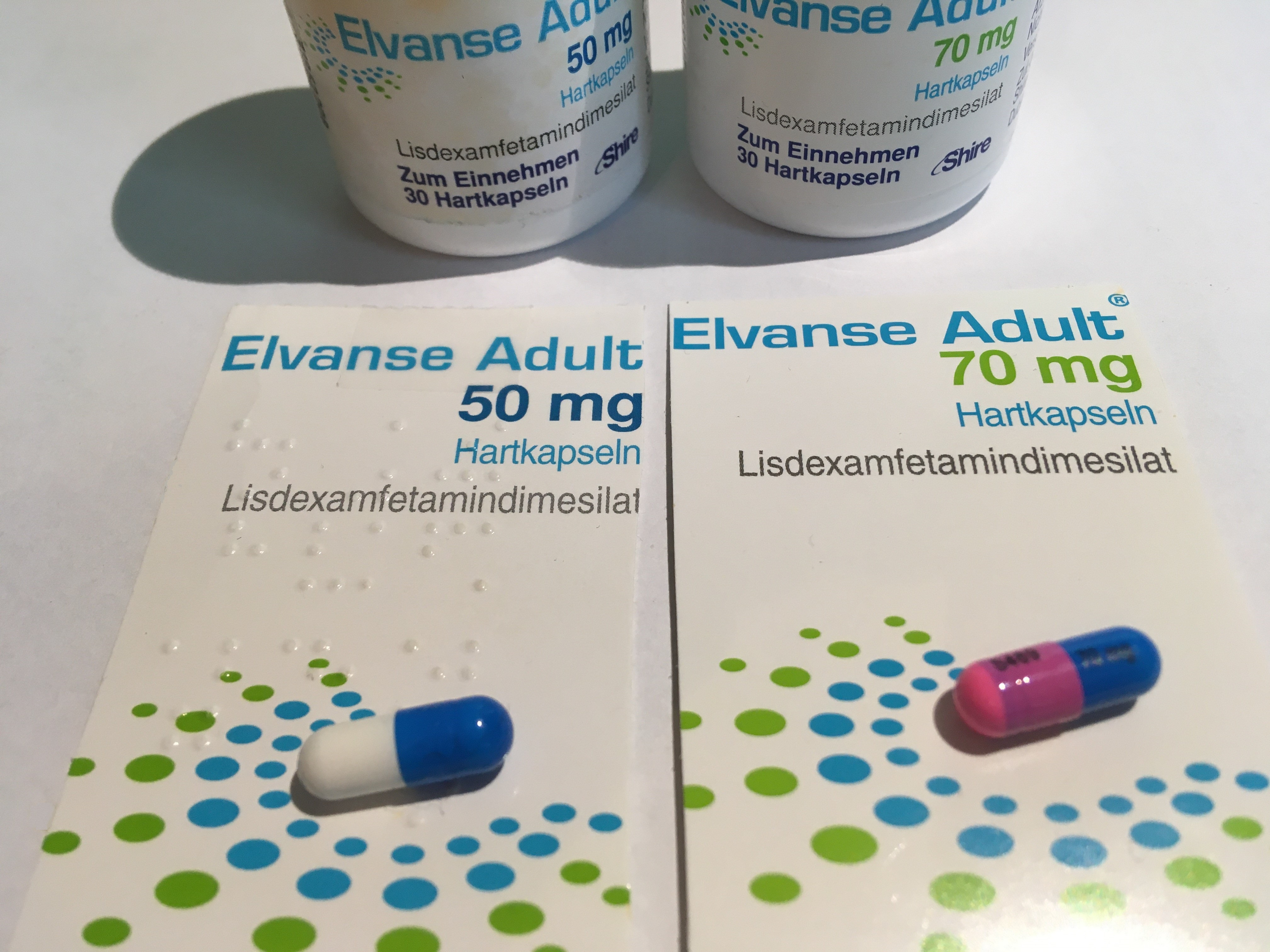
Elvanse Adult capsules 50mg and 70mg laid on the packaging (German)

lisdexamfetamine is the International Nonproprietary Name (INN) and is a contraction of L-lysine-dextroamphetamine.

As of November 2020, lisdexamfetamine is sold under the following brand names: Aduvanz, Elvanse, Juneve, Samexid, Tyvense, Venvanse, and Vyvanse.

== Research ==
=== Depression ===
Amphetamine was used to treat depression starting in the 1930s and has been described as the first antidepressant. In clinical studies in the 1970s and 1980s, psychostimulants, including amphetamine and methylphenidate, were found to transiently improve mood in a majority of people with depression and to increase psychomotor activation in almost all individuals.

Some clinical trials that used lisdexamfetamine as an add-on therapy with a selective serotonin reuptake inhibitor (SSRI) or serotonin-norepinephrine reuptake inhibitor (SNRI) for treatment-resistant depression indicated that this is no more effective than the use of an SSRI or SNRI alone. Other studies indicated that psychostimulants potentiated antidepressants, and were under-prescribed for treatment-resistant depression. In those studies, patients showed significant improvement in energy, mood, and psychomotor activity. Clinical guidelines advise caution in the use of stimulants for depression and advise them only as second- or third-line adjunctive agents.

In February 2014, Shire announced that two late-stage clinical trials had found that Vyvanse was not an effective treatment for depression, and development for this indication was discontinued. A 2018 meta-analysis of randomized controlled trials of lisdexamfetamine for antidepressant augmentation in people with major depressive disorder—the first to be conducted—found that lisdexamfetamine was not significantly better than placebo in improving Montgomery–Åsberg Depression Rating Scale scores, response rates, or remission rates. However, there was indication of a small effect in improving depressive symptoms that approached trend-level significance. lisdexamfetamine was well-tolerated in the meta-analysis. The quantity of evidence was limited, with only four trials included. In a subsequent 2022 network meta-analysis, lisdexamfetamine was significantly effective as an antidepressant augmentation for treatment-resistant depression.

Although lisdexamfetamine has shown limited effectiveness in the treatment of depression in clinical trials, a phase II clinical study found that the addition of lisdexamfetamine to an antidepressant improved executive dysfunction in people with mild major depressive disorder but persisting executive dysfunction.
