= Lysergyl-alanine =

Clinical data
- Other names: Lysergylalanine
- ATC code: None

Identifiers
- IUPAC name: (2S)-2-[[(6aR,9R)-7-methyl-6,6a,8,9-tetrahydro-4H-indolo[4,3-fg]quinoline-9-carbonyl]amino]propanoic acid
- PubChem CID: 101262010

Chemical and physical data
- Formula: C_{19}H_{21}N_{3}O_{3}
- Molar mass: 339.395 g·mol^{−1}
- 3D model (JSmol): Interactive image
- SMILES: C[C@@H](C(=O)O)NC(=O)[C@H]1CN([C@@H]2CC3=CNC4=CC=CC(=C34)C2=C1)C
- InChI: InChI=1S/C19H21N3O3/c1-10(19(24)25)21-18(23)12-6-14-13-4-3-5-15-17(13)11(8-20-15)7-16(14)22(2)9-12/h3-6,8,10,12,16,20H,7,9H2,1-2H3,(H,21,23)(H,24,25)/t10-,12+,16+/m0/s1; Key:GJBAFJZTKHRAIM-KANYHAFZSA-N

Lysergyl-alanine, or lysergylalanine, is an ergot alkaloid and biosynthetic intermediate of other ergot alkaloids like ergine (lysergic acid amide; LSA), lysergic acid hydroxyethylamide (LSH), and ergometrine. It has been reported to occur in concentrations 4-fold lower than those of ergine in Epichloë-infected ryegrass leaves. The alkaloid has also been detected in Argyreia nervosa (Hawaiian baby woodrose) seeds. Lysergyl-alanine was first described in the scientific literature by 1969.

== See also ==
- Substituted lysergamide
- Ergopeptine
- Ergovalide
- Lysergyl-L-valyl methyl ester
- Ergosecaline
- Ergometrine
- LA-3Cl-SB
