= MPD-75 =

Clinical data
- Other names: MPD75; 1-Methyl-N-pyrrolidyllysergamide; 1-Methyllysergic acid pyrrolidide; 1-Methyl-LA-pyrrolidineamide; (1,6-Dimethyl-9,10-didehydroergolin-8β-yl)(pyrrolidin-1-yl)methanone
- Routes of administration: Oral
- Drug class: Serotonin receptor modulator; Serotonergic psychedelic; Hallucinogen
- ATC code: None

Identifiers
- IUPAC name: [(6aR,9R)-4,7-dimethyl-6,6a,8,9-tetrahydroindolo[4,3-fg]quinolin-9-yl]-pyrrolidin-1-ylmethanone
- CAS Number: 7221-79-6
- PubChem CID: 201987
- ChemSpider: 174911
- CompTox Dashboard (EPA): DTXSID10992947

Chemical and physical data
- Formula: C_{21}H_{25}N_{3}O
- Molar mass: 335.451 g·mol^{−1}
- 3D model (JSmol): Interactive image
- SMILES: CN1C[C@@H](C=C2[C@H]1CC3=CN(C4=CC=CC2=C34)C)C(=O)N5CCCC5
- InChI: InChI=1S/C21H25N3O/c1-22-12-14-11-19-17(16-6-5-7-18(22)20(14)16)10-15(13-23(19)2)21(25)24-8-3-4-9-24/h5-7,10,12,15,19H,3-4,8-9,11,13H2,1-2H3/t15-,19-/m1/s1; Key:PWISINPCTJKXCA-DNVCBOLYSA-N

MPD-75, also known as 1-methyl-N-pyrrolidyllysergamide or as 1-methyllysergic acid pyrrolidide, is a psychedelic drug of the lysergamide family related to lysergic acid diethylamide (LSD). It is the 1-methyl derivative of lysergic acid pyrrolidide (LA-Pyr; LPD-824) and the N-pyrrolidide analogue of 1-methyl-LSD (MLD-41). Extensive metabolism of other 1-methylated lysergamides to their secondary amine derivatives, for instance methysergide (1-methylmethylergometrine) conversion into methylergometrine, has been observed.

== Use and effects ==
MPD-75 was evaluated in humans and was found to produce partial LSD-like effects. It was reported to have had a faster onset and shorter duration compared to LSD. MPD-75 showed less than 5% of the potency of LSD in producing LSD-like effects, with a required dose of >20 μg/kg or >1.6 mg orally. According to another source however, MPD-75 had 7% of the potency of LSD in humans. For comparison, LA-Pyr (LPD-824) had approximately 10% of the potency of LSD and had more full LSD-like effects, while 1-methyl-LSD (MLD-41) had 33% of the potency of LSD and likewise produced full LSD-like effects.

== Pharmacology ==
=== Pharmacodynamics ===
In animal studies, MPD-75 had 4% of the toxicity of LSD in rabbits (presumably in terms of LD_{50}), 0% of its pyretogenic activity in rabbits, and 130% of its antiserotonergic activity in the isolated rat uterus.

== History ==
MPD-75 was first described in the scientific literature by Albert Hofmann and colleagues by 1957. It has not been encountered as a designer drug as of 2020.

== See also ==
- Substituted lysergamide
- Lysergic acid pyrrolidide (LA-Pyr; LPD-824)
- MLD-41 (1-methyl-LSD)
- MLA-74 (1-methyl-LAE)
