= Lomardexamfetamine =

Clinical data
- Other names: KP106; L-Homoarginine-D-amphetamine
- Routes of administration: Oral
- Drug class: Norepinephrine–dopamine releasing agent; Stimulant
- ATC code: None

Identifiers
- IUPAC name: (2S)-2-amino-6-(diaminomethylideneamino)-N-[(2S)-1-phenylpropan-2-yl]hexanamide
- CAS Number: 1032291-80-7
- PubChem CID: 44201340
- DrugBank: DB21459
- ChemSpider: 81368305
- UNII: Q5L4P8K8QZ

Chemical and physical data
- Formula: C_{16}H_{27}N_{5}O
- Molar mass: 305.426 g·mol^{−1}
- 3D model (JSmol): Interactive image
- SMILES: C[C@@H](CC1=CC=CC=C1)NC(=O)[C@H](CCCCN=C(N)N)N
- InChI: InChI=1S/C16H27N5O/c1-12(11-13-7-3-2-4-8-13)21-15(22)14(17)9-5-6-10-20-16(18)19/h2-4,7-8,12,14H,5-6,9-11,17H2,1H3,(H,21,22)(H4,18,19,20)/t12-,14-/m0/s1; Key:DRLPEFJOKVYESM-JSGCOSHPSA-N

Lomardexamfetamine (INN; developmental code name KP-106), also known as L-homoarginine-D-amphetamine, is a psychostimulant of the amphetamine family which was under development for the treatment of attention deficit hyperactivity disorder (ADHD) but was never marketed. It is taken orally as an oral film. The drug is a prodrug of dextroamphetamine analogously to lisdexamfetamine and with similarly reduced misuse potential. Lomardexamfetamine was originated and under development by KemPharm (now known as Zevra Therapeutics). It reached phase 1 clinical trials prior to the discontinuation of its development in 2013.

== See also ==
- Substituted amphetamine
- Lisdexamfetamine
- Lys-MDA and Lys-MDMA
- Serdexmethylphenidate
