= Ergovalide =

Clinical data
- Other names: Lysergylvaline amide; N-Lysergylvalylamide; N-((1S)-1-(aminocarbonyl)-2-methylpropyl)-9,10-didehydro-6-methylergoline-8β-carboxamide
- ATC code: None

Identifiers
- IUPAC name: (6aR,9R)-N-[(2S)-1-amino-3-methyl-1-oxobutan-2-yl]-7-methyl-6,6a,8,9-tetrahydro-4H-indolo[4,3-fg]quinoline-9-carboxamide
- CAS Number: 41645-63-0
- PubChem CID: 122201209
- ChemSpider: 58828325
- UNII: JPP32X8UKL

Chemical and physical data
- Formula: C_{21}H_{26}N_{4}O_{2}
- Molar mass: 366.465 g·mol^{−1}
- 3D model (JSmol): Interactive image
- SMILES: CC(C)[C@@H](C(=O)N)NC(=O)[C@H]1CN([C@@H]2CC3=CNC4=CC=CC(=C34)C2=C1)C
- InChI: InChI=1S/C21H26N4O2/c1-11(2)19(20(22)26)24-21(27)13-7-15-14-5-4-6-16-18(14)12(9-23-16)8-17(15)25(3)10-13/h4-7,9,11,13,17,19,23H,8,10H2,1-3H3,(H2,22,26)(H,24,27)/t13-,17-,19+/m1/s1; Key:MOJONCDRJGJHBT-XVSDVWIESA-N

Ergovalide, also known as lysergylvaline amide or as N-lysergylvalylamide, is an ergot alkaloid of the lysergamide family found in Claviceps purpurea (ergot). It is said to constitute about 10 to 20% of the alkaloid content of ergot. However, according to a secondary source, ergovalide is probably a chemical artifact arising from solvolytic cleavage of ergocristine (lysergylvalylphenylalanylproline) (which is a highly variable constituent but can constitute as much as 50% of alkaloids in ergot). Ergovalide was first described in the scientific literature by A. N. Ban'kovskaya and colleagues in 1973.

== See also ==
- Substituted lysergamide
- Ergopeptine
- Lysergyl-L-valyl methyl ester
- Lysergyl-alanine
- Ergosecaline
