= Ergosecaline =

Clinical data
- Other names: N-[(2R,5S)-5-isopropyl-2-methyl-3,6-dioxo-2-morpholinyl]-6-methyl-9,10-didehydroergoline-8β-carboxamide
- ATC code: None

Identifiers
- IUPAC name: (6aR,9R)-7-methyl-N-[(2S,5S)-2-methyl-3,6-dioxo-5-propan-2-ylmorpholin-2-yl]-6,6a,8,9-tetrahydro-4H-indolo[4,3-fg]quinoline-9-carboxamide
- PubChem CID: 139586689
- ChemSpider: 58828612
- ChEBI: CHEBI:226624

Chemical and physical data
- Formula: C_{24}H_{28}N_{4}O_{4}
- Molar mass: 436.512 g·mol^{−1}
- 3D model (JSmol): Interactive image
- SMILES: CC(C)[C@H]1C(=O)O[C@](C(=O)N1)(C)NC(=O)[C@H]2CN([C@@H]3CC4=CNC5=CC=CC(=C45)C3=C2)C
- InChI: InChI=1S/C24H28N4O4/c1-12(2)20-22(30)32-24(3,23(31)26-20)27-21(29)14-8-16-15-6-5-7-17-19(15)13(10-25-17)9-18(16)28(4)11-14/h5-8,10,12,14,18,20,25H,9,11H2,1-4H3,(H,26,31)(H,27,29)/t14-,18-,20+,24+/m1/s1; Key:SJBHTLCEMGAZPJ-MBQSRQCLSA-N

Ergosecaline is an ergot alkaloid and ergopeptine found in Claviceps purpurea (ergot). It has a simpler structure than other ergopeptines. The alkaloid was first described in the scientific literature by Matazō Abe and colleagues in 1959.

== See also ==
- Ergopeptine
- Ergovalide
- Lysergyl-alanine
