= LA-Aziridine =

Clinical data
- Other names: LSD-Aziridine; N-(2,3-Dimethylaziridin-1-yl)lysergamide; Lysergic acid-(2,3-dimethylaziridinyl)amide
- ATC code: None

Identifiers
- IUPAC name: (2,3-Dimethylaziridin-1-yl)(6-methyl-9,10-didehydroergolin-8β-yl)methanone
- ChemSpider: 24604704

Chemical and physical data
- Formula: C_{20}H_{23}N_{3}O
- Molar mass: 321.424 g·mol^{−1}
- 3D model (JSmol): Interactive image
- SMILES: CN1C[C@@H](C=C2[C@H]1Cc1c[nH]c3c1c2ccc3)C(=O)N1C(C1C)C
- InChI: InChI=1S/C20H23N3O/c1-11-12(2)23(11)20(24)14-7-16-15-5-4-6-17-19(15)13(9-21-17)8-18(16)22(3)10-14/h4-7,9,11-12,14,18,21H,8,10H2,1-3H3/t11?,12?,14-,18-,23?/m1/s1; Key:JWVUYYPVOKOFGC-BVAZEHJSSA-N

LA-Aziridine, also known as N-(2,3-dimethylaziridin-1-yl)lysergamide or as lysergic acid-(2,3-dimethylaziridinyl)amide, is a chemical compound of the lysergamide family related to lysergic acid diethylamide (LSD). It is an analogue of LSD in which the N,N-diethyl groups have been fused together to form an N-(2,3-dimethylaziridine) ring moiety. The compound has two additional chiral centers in the aziridine region and thus has three diastereomeric forms: (R,R)-trans, (S,S)-trans, and cis. LA-Aziridine is closely related to lysergic acid 2,4-dimethylazetidide (LA-Az, LSZ, or LA-Azetidide).

The laboratory of David E. Nichols and colleagues synthesized LA-Aziridine in the 1980s while studying the influence of stereoselectivity on lysergamide activity. However, LA-Aziridine proved to be chemically unstable such that in-vivo usefulness was precluded, and they abandoned their efforts with the compound. Instead, the group studied LA-3Cl-SB, another analogue of LSD in which the diethylamide moiety was replaced with a 2-chloro-1-methylpropylamide moiety and that had four possible stereoisomers. These stereoisomers successfully substituted for LSD in rodent drug discrimination tests with varying potencies. In addition, Nichols and colleagues subsequently turned their attention to LSZ, which proved active and did not have the stability problems of LA-Aziridine.

Other analogues besides LA-Aziridine and LSZ have also been studied, for instance the N-(2,5-dimethylpyrrolidide) (a derivative of LA-Pyr) and the N-(2,6-dimethylpiperidide) (a derivative of LA-Pip) analogues.

== See also ==
- Substituted lysergamide
- CE-LAD
