= LA-3Cl-SB =

Clinical data
- Other names: Cl-LSB; Lysergic acid N-(3-chloro-sec-butyl)amide; N-[3-Chlorobutan-2-yl]-6-methyl-9,10-didehydroergoline-8β-carboxamide
- Drug class: Serotonergic psychedelic; Hallucinogen
- ATC code: None

Identifiers
- IUPAC name: (6aR,9R)-N-[3-Chlorobutan-2-yl]-7-methyl-4,6,6a,7,8,9-hexahydroindolo[4,3-fg]quinoline-9-carboxamide

Chemical and physical data
- Formula: C_{20}H_{24}ClN_{3}O
- Molar mass: 357.88 g·mol^{−1}
- 3D model (JSmol): Interactive image
- SMILES: CC(Cl)C(C)NC(=O)C1CN(C)C2Cc3c[nH]c4cccc(C2=C1)c34
- InChI: InChI=1S/C20H24ClN3O/c1-11(21)12(2)23-20(25)14-7-16-15-5-4-6-17-19(15)13(9-22-17)8-18(16)24(3)10-14/h4-7,9,11-12,14,18,22H,8,10H2,1-3H3,(H,23,25); Key:DYECHXACIVFYSZ-UHFFFAOYSA-N

LA-3Cl-SB, also known as Cl-LSB or as lysergic acid N-(3-chloro-sec-butyl)amide, is a putative serotonergic psychedelic of the lysergamide family related to lysergic acid diethylamide (LSD). It has two additional chiral centers in the amide region relative to LSD and hence has four possible diastereomers in this area. The compound is a chlorinated derivative of lysergic acid 2-butyl amide (LSB).

The four diastereomers of LA-3Cl-SB completely substitute for LSD in rodent drug discrimination tests, suggesting that they would be hallucinogenic in humans. There was, however, a 22-fold range of difference in potency for the four compounds in the assay. In terms of ED_{50} values, the LA-3Cl-SB diastereomers were 155%, 27%, 11%, and 7% of the potency of LSD. As such, the most potent diastereomer of LA-3Cl-SB was notably more potent than LSD itself in terms of producing LSD-like effects in animals.

LA-3Cl-SB and its diastereomers were first described in the scientific literature by Robert Oberlender of the lab of David E. Nichols at Purdue University by 1989. The most potent diastereomer of LA-3Cl-SB was the first LSD analogue modified at the amide that was found to be more or similarly as potent as LSD in animals or humans, with all others up to that point resulting in dramatic losses of potency. These findings suggested that the N,N-diethylamide moiety of LSD isn't necessarily the most optimal configuration in terms of potency. The results were also particularly notable in that LA-3Cl-SB is an N-monoalkylamide rather than an N,N-dialkylamide like LSD. Subsequent research by the Nichols group led to the development of related compounds like LSB and LSZ (LA-Azetidide).

== See also ==
- Substituted lysergamide
- LA-Aziridide
- LA-Azetidide (LA-Az, LSZ)
- CE-LAD
- LY-53857
- Lysergyl-alanine
