= Cilostamide =

Names
- Preferred IUPAC name N-Cyclohexyl-N-methyl-4-[(2-oxo-1,2-dihydroquinolin-6-yl)oxy]butanamide

Identifiers
CAS Number	68550-75-4
3D model (JSmol)	Interactive image
ChEMBL	ChEMBL34431
ChemSpider	2651
IUPHAR/BPS	5167
PubChem CID	2753
UNII	45S5605Q18
CompTox Dashboard (EPA)	DTXSID3045140
- InChI: InChI=1S/C20H26N2O3/c1-22(16-6-3-2-4-7-16)20(24)8-5-13-25-17-10-11-18-15(14-17)9-12-19(23)21-18/h9-12,14,16H,2-8,13H2,1H3,(H,21,23) Key: UIAYVIIHMORPSJ-UHFFFAOYSA-N
- SMILES: CN(C1CCCCC1)C(=O)CCCOC2=CC3=C(C=C2)NC(=O)C=C3

Properties
Chemical formula	C_{20}H_{26}N_{2}O_{3}
Molar mass	342.439 g·mol^{−1}
- Except where otherwise noted, data are given for materials in their standard state (at 25 °C [77 °F], 100 kPa). Infobox references

Cilostamide is a PDE3 inhibitor.
