= LSM-775 =

Chemical compound

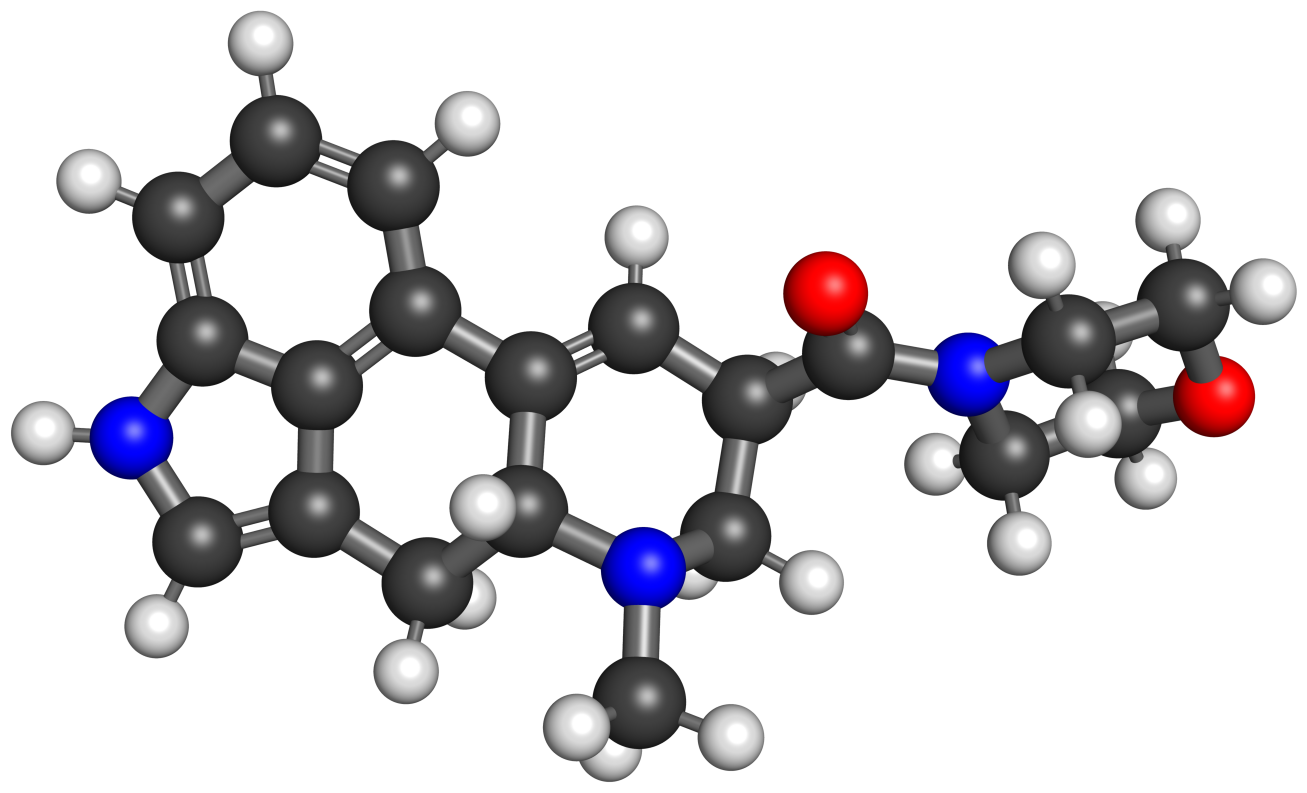

Clinical data
- Other names: LSM775; LSM; SLM; N-Morpholinyllysergamide; Lysergic acid morpholide; LA-Morph; LA-Morpholide; Morpholine lysergamide; 6-Methyl-8β-(morpholin-4-ylcarbonyl)-9,10-didehydroergoline
- Routes of administration: Oral
- Drug class: Serotonin receptor modulator; Serotonin 5-HT_{2A} receptor agonist; Serotonergic psychedelic; Hallucinogen

Legal status
- Legal status: DE: NpSG (Industrial and scientific use only); UK: Under Psychoactive Substances Act; Illegal in France

Identifiers
- IUPAC name: [(6aR,9R)-7-methyl-6,6a,8,9-tetrahydro-4H-indolo[4,3-fg]quinolin-9-yl]-morpholin-4-ylmethanone
- CAS Number: 4314-63-0
- PubChem CID: 199507
- ChemSpider: 172695
- UNII: 168Y0PXM7S
- CompTox Dashboard (EPA): DTXSID50195718

Chemical and physical data
- Formula: C_{20}H_{23}N_{3}O_{2}
- Molar mass: 337.423 g·mol^{−1}
- 3D model (JSmol): Interactive image
- SMILES: O=C(N1CCOCC1)[C@@H]5C=C4c2cccc3c2c(c[nH]3)C[C@H]4N(C)C5
- InChI: InChI=1S/C20H23N3O2/c1-22-12-14(20(24)23-5-7-25-8-6-23)9-16-15-3-2-4-17-19(15)13(11-21-17)10-18(16)22/h2-4,9,11,14,18,21H,5-8,10,12H2,1H3/t14-,18-/m1/s1; Key:OTQWCDNEJVKXKG-RDTXWAMCSA-N

LSM-775, also known as N-morpholinyllysergamide or as lysergic acid morpholide, is a psychedelic drug of the lysergamide family related to lysergic acid diethylamide (LSD).

== Use and effects ==
LSM-775 is less potent than LSD but is reported to have some LSD-like effects at doses ranging from 75 to 1,000 μg orally and a shorter duration. It may only produce weak or threshold psychedelic effects in humans. There have been said to be fewer signs of cardiovascular stimulation and peripheral toxicity with LSM-775 compared to LSD. On the other hand, more recent reports suggest that LSM-75 produces considerable nausea and feelings of lethargy and sedation.

== Pharmacology ==
=== Pharmacodynamics ===
LSM-775 is a potent full agonist of the serotonin 5-HT_{1A} receptor and a potent partial agonist of the serotonin 5-HT_{2A}, 5-HT_{2B}, and 5-HT_{2C} receptors. It does not produce the head-twitch response, a behavioral proxy of psychedelic effects, in rodents. However, LSM-775 can robustly increase head twitches if it is coadministered with the serotonin 5-HT_{1A} receptor antagonist WAY-100635. These findings indicate that serotonin 5-HT_{1A} receptor activation suppresses the psychedelic-like effects of LSM-775.

== Chemistry ==
=== Synthesis ===
The chemical synthesis of LSM-775 has been described.

=== Analogues ===
Analogues of LSM-775 include the cyclized lysergic acid piperidide (LA-Pip), lysergic acid azepane (LA-Azepane), lysergic acid pyrrolidide (LA-Pyr; LPD-824), lysergic acid pyrrolinide (LPN), and lysergic acid 2,4-dimethylazetidide (LA-Az, LSZ) and the non-cyclized LEO, LA-MeO, ergometrine, and methylergometrine, among others.

== History ==
LSM-775 was first described in the scientific literature by Albert Hofmann and colleagues by 1955. It emerged as a novel designer drug in 2013.

== Society and culture ==
=== Legal status ===
==== Canada ====
LSM-775 is not a controlled substance in Canada as of 2025.

==== United States ====
LSM-775 is not an explicitly controlled substance in the United States. However, it could be considered a controlled substance under the Federal Analogue Act if intended for human consumption.

== See also ==
- Substituted lysergamide
- Non-hallucinogenic 5-HT_{2A} receptor agonist
