= Amesergide =

Chemical compound

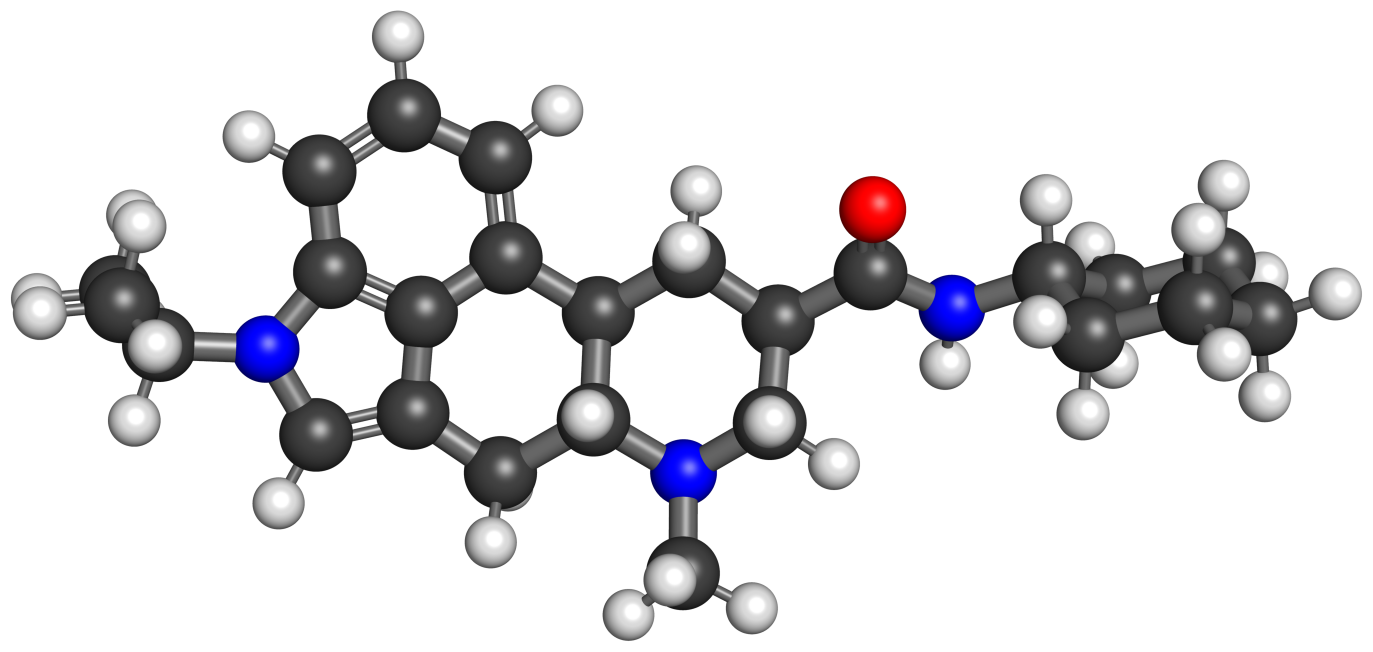

Clinical data
- Other names: LY-237733; N-Cyclohexyl-11-isopropyllysergamide
- Routes of administration: Oral
- Drug class: Serotonin receptor antagonist; Serotonin 5-HT_{2} receptor antagonist
- ATC code: None

Identifiers
- IUPAC name: (6aR,9R,10aR)-N-Cyclohexyl-7-methyl-4-propan-2-yl-6,6a,8,9,10,10a-hexahydroindolo[4,3-fg]quinoline-9-carboxamide
- CAS Number: 121588-75-8
- PubChem CID: 9821951
- ChemSpider: 7997700
- UNII: EJL329H95R
- KEGG: D02893
- ChEMBL: ChEMBL160293
- CompTox Dashboard (EPA): DTXSID8052851

Chemical and physical data
- Formula: C_{25}H_{35}N_{3}O
- Molar mass: 393.575 g·mol^{−1}
- 3D model (JSmol): Interactive image
- SMILES: CC(C)N1C=C2C[C@@H]3[C@H](C[C@H](CN3C)C(=O)NC4CCCCC4)C5=C2C1=CC=C5
- InChI: InChI=1S/C25H35N3O/c1-16(2)28-15-17-13-23-21(20-10-7-11-22(28)24(17)20)12-18(14-27(23)3)25(29)26-19-8-5-4-6-9-19/h7,10-11,15-16,18-19,21,23H,4-6,8-9,12-14H2,1-3H3,(H,26,29)/t18-,21-,23-/m1/s1; Key:KEMOOQHMCGCZKH-JMUQELJHSA-N

Amesergide (INN, USAN; developmental code name LY-237733) is a serotonin receptor antagonist of the ergoline and lysergamide families related to methysergide which was under development by Eli Lilly and Company for the treatment of a variety of conditions including depression, anxiety, schizophrenia, male sexual dysfunction, migraine, and thrombosis but was never marketed. It reached phase II clinical trials for the treatment of depression, erectile dysfunction, and premature ejaculation prior to the discontinuation of its development.

== Pharmacology ==
=== Pharmacodynamics ===
Amesergide acts as a selective antagonist of the serotonin 5-HT_{2A}, 5-HT_{2B}, and 5-HT_{2C} receptors (K_{i} = 1.96–15.1 nM). It is also an antagonist of the serotonin 5-HT_{7} receptor with relatively lower affinity (K_{i} = 78.0 nM). The drug is a potent antagonist of the α_{2}-adrenergic receptor in addition to the 5-HT_{2} receptors via its major active metabolite 4-hydroxyamesergide (K_{i} = 13 nM). This profile of activity is similar to that of the so-called noradrenergic and specific serotonergic antidepressant (NaSSA) mirtazapine (Remeron).

Amesergide also has affinity for the serotonin 5-HT_{1D} receptor (K_{i} = 57.9 nM) and lower affinity for the serotonin 5-HT_{1A}, α_{1}-adrenergic, and dopamine D_{1} and D_{2} receptors (K_{i} = 150–730 nM). It has negligible affinity for the histamine H_{1} and muscarinic acetylcholine receptors (K_{i} > 10,000 nM). The drug does not appear to have been assessed at the serotonin 5-HT_{1E}, 5-HT_{1F}, 5-HT_{4}, 5-HT_{5A}, and 5-HT_{6} receptors, nor at the dopamine D_{3}, D_{4}, and D_{5} receptors.

Affinities of amesergide at various sites
Site	Affinity (K_{i} [nM])	Species	Source
5-HT_{1A}	177.3	Rat	
5-HT_{1B}	?	?	?
5-HT_{1D}	57.9	Cow	
5-HT_{2A}	15.1; 12.4	Human; Rat	
5-HT_{2B}	1.96	Human	
5-HT_{2C}	6.27; 13.27	Human; Pig	
5-HT_{3}	>10,000	Rat	
5-HT_{6}	?	?	?
5-HT_{7}	78.0	Human	
α_{1}	730	Rat	
α_{2}	50; 13 (MB)	Rat	
β	>10,000	Rat	
D_{1}	150	Rat	
D_{2}	520	Rat	
H_{1}	>10,000	Rat	
mACh	>10,000	Rat	
Notes: The smaller the affinity value, the more strongly the drug binds to the site.

== See also ==
- Substituted lysergamide
- List of investigational antidepressants
- List of investigational sexual dysfunction drugs
