= LY-215840 =

Chemical compound

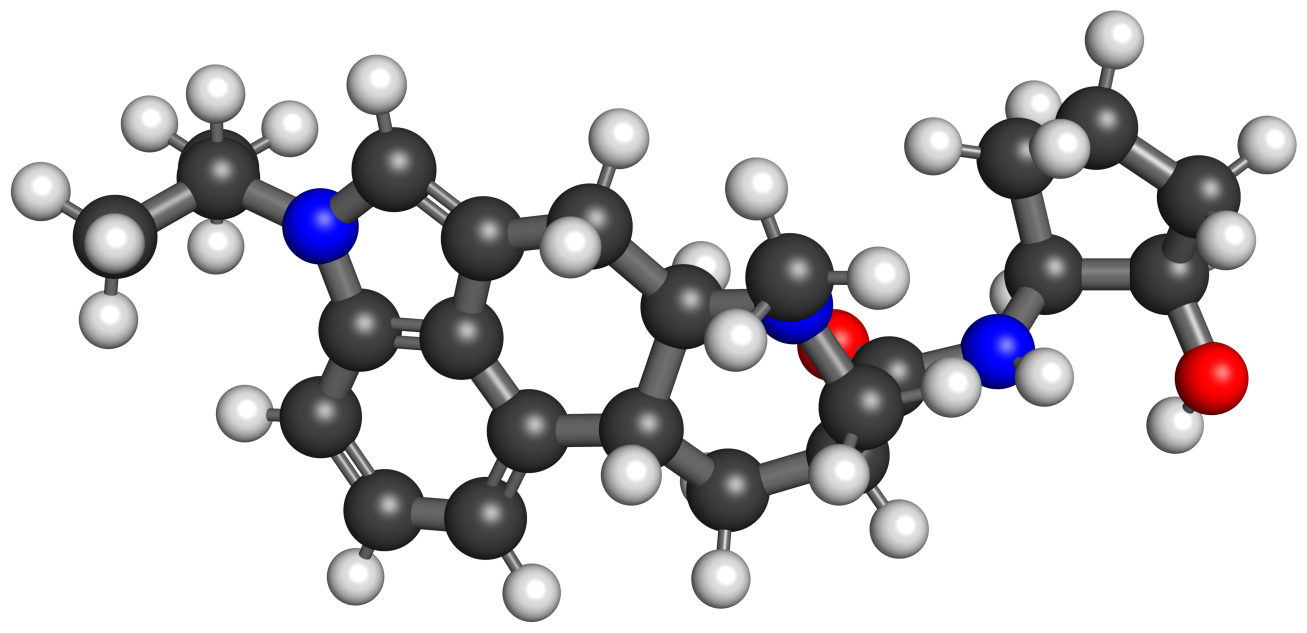

Clinical data
- Drug class: Serotonin receptor antagonist; Serotonin 5-HT_{2} receptor antagonist; Serotonin 5-HT_{7} receptor antagonist

Identifiers
- IUPAC name: (6aR,9R,10aR)-N-((1S,2R)-2-hydroxycyclopentyl)-4-isopropyl-7-methyl-4,6,6a,7,8,9,10,10a-octahydroindolo[4,3-fg]quinoline-9-carboxamide
- CAS Number: 137328-52-0
- PubChem CID: 9822062
- IUPHAR/BPS: 180
- ChemSpider: 7997811
- UNII: D2G5U4P5B3
- CompTox Dashboard (EPA): DTXSID20929769

Chemical and physical data
- Formula: C_{24}H_{33}N_{3}O_{2}
- Molar mass: 395.547 g·mol^{−1}
- 3D model (JSmol): Interactive image
- SMILES: CN1[C@]([C@]2([H])C[C@@H](C(N[C@@H]3[C@H](O)CCC3)=O)C1)([H])CC4=CN(C(C)C)C5=CC=CC2=C54
- InChI: InChI=1S/C24H33N3O2/c1-14(2)27-13-15-11-21-18(17-6-4-8-20(27)23(15)17)10-16(12-26(21)3)24(29)25-19-7-5-9-22(19)28/h4,6,8,13-14,16,18-19,21-22,28H,5,7,9-12H2,1-3H3,(H,25,29)/t16-,18-,19+,21-,22-/m1/s1; Key:IMSDOBUYDTVEHN-ILMFXRJHSA-N

LY-215,840 is an ergoline and lysergamide derivative drug developed by Eli Lilly, which acts as a potent and selective antagonist at the serotonin 5-HT_{2} and 5-HT_{7} receptors. It has anti-hypertensive and muscle relaxant effects in animal studies.

== See also ==
- Substituted lysergamide
