= LA-Pip =

Compound related to LSD

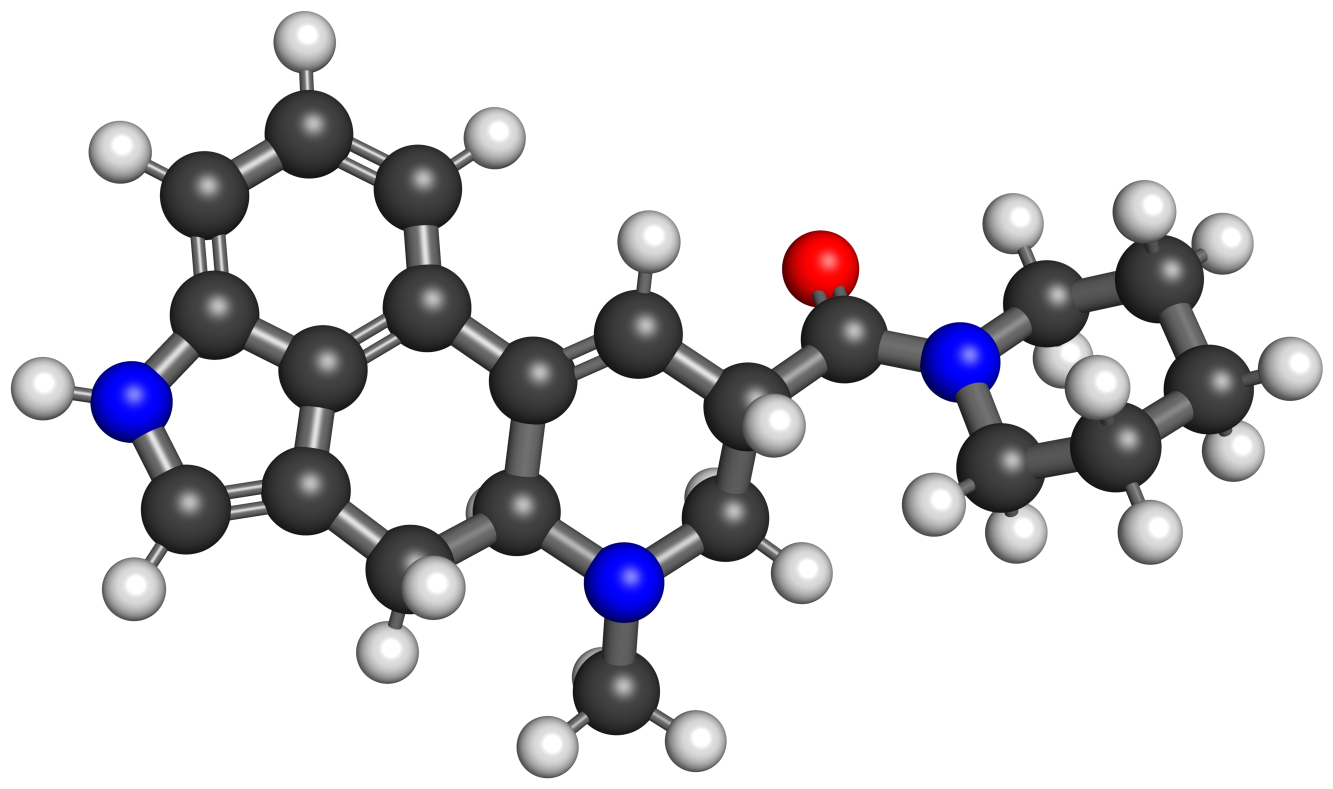

Clinical data
- Other names: LSD-Pip; N-Piperidinyllysergamide; N-Piperidine lysergamide; LA-Pip; LSDPip; LAPip; 6-Methyl-8β-(piperidin-1-ylcarbonyl)-9,10-didehydroergoline
- Drug class: Serotonin receptor modulator

Identifiers
- IUPAC name: [(6aR,9R)-7-methyl-6,6a,8,9-tetrahydro-4H-indolo[4,3-fg]quinolin-9-yl]-piperidin-1-ylmethanone
- CAS Number: 50485-23-9
- PubChem CID: 308707
- ChemSpider: 35303396
- UNII: CKN3AJ58H9
- CompTox Dashboard (EPA): DTXSID20308999

Chemical and physical data
- Formula: C_{21}H_{25}N_{3}O
- Molar mass: 335.451 g·mol^{−1}
- 3D model (JSmol): Interactive image
- SMILES: CN1C[C@@H](C=C2[C@H]1Cc3c[nH]c4c3c2ccc4)C(=O)N5CCCCC5
- InChI: InChI=1S/C21H25N3O/c1-23-13-15(21(25)24-8-3-2-4-9-24)10-17-16-6-5-7-18-20(16)14(12-22-18)11-19(17)23/h5-7,10,12,15,19,22H,2-4,8-9,11,13H2,1H3/t15-,19-/m1/s1; Key:URDULHYODQAQTM-DNVCBOLYSA-N

Lysergic acid piperidide (LA-Pip or LSD-Pip), also known as N-piperidinyllysergamide, is a serotonin receptor modulator of the lysergamide family related to lysergic acid diethylamide (LSD). It is the analogue of LSD in which the N,N-diethyl substitution has been replaced with an N-piperidide ring.

The drug has fairly similar affinity and efficacy as a serotonin 5-HT_{2A} receptor agonist compared to LSD, though is variably less potent in terms of EC_{50} depending on the assay. It also has high affinity for the serotonin 5-HT_{1A} and 5-HT_{2C} receptors. LA-Pip has about 8.5% of the antiserotonergic activity of LSD (relative to 2.0% for LSM-775 and 4.7% for LPD-824) in the isolated rat uterus in vitro.

LA-Pip has been said to be non-hallucinogenic or much less psychedelic than LSD in humans. However, this does not appear to have actually been stated anywhere in the originally cited source. Other sources indicate that LA-Pip has not been assessed in humans. Correspondingly, the dose range and potency of LA-Pip as a psychedelic relative to LSD have not been reported.

LA-Pip was first described in the scientific literature by Albert Hofmann and colleagues by 1955. There were additional publications on the compound in the later 1950s. It has not been encountered as a designer drug as of 2020. The drug is not a controlled substance in Canada as of 2025.

== See also ==
- Substituted lysergamide
- Lysergic acid pyrrolidide (LPD-824)
- Lysergic acid morpholide (LSM-775)
- Lysergic acid azepane (LA-Azepane)
- Lysergic acid 2,4-dimethylazetidide (LA-SS-Az, LSZ)
- Lysergic acid 2-butyl amide (LSB)
- 25B-NAcPip
