= LPD-824 =

Chemical compound

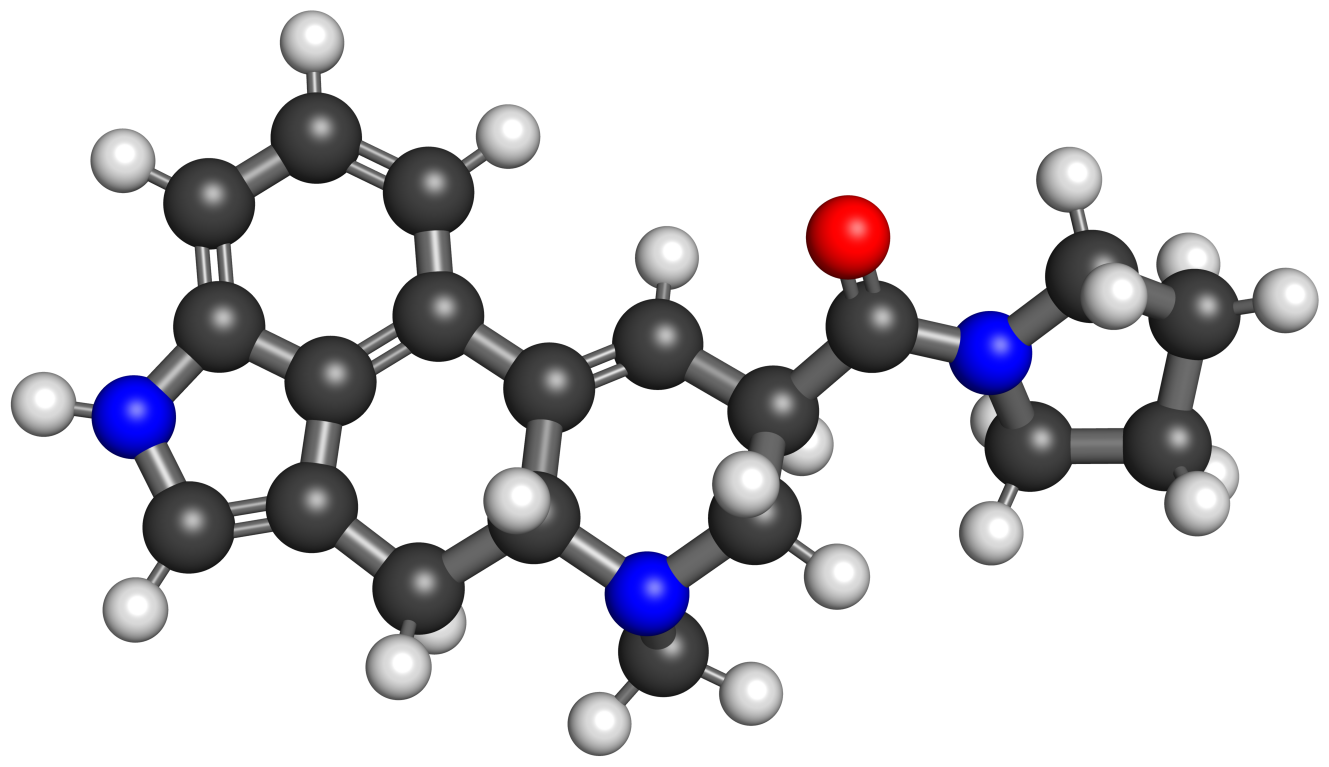

Clinical data
- Other names: LPD-824; LPD824; N-Pyrrolidyllysergamide; Lysergic acid pyrrolidide; LA-Pyr; LSD-Pyr
- Drug class: Serotonin receptor modulator; Serotonin 5-HT_{2A} receptor agonist; Serotonergic psychedelic; Hallucinogen

Identifiers
- IUPAC name: (8β)-6-Methyl-8-(pyrrolidin-1-ylcarbonyl)-9,10-didehydroergoline
- CAS Number: 2385-87-7
- PubChem CID: 200628
- ChemSpider: 173678
- ChEMBL: ChEMBL302524
- CompTox Dashboard (EPA): DTXSID20946653

Chemical and physical data
- Formula: C_{20}H_{23}N_{3}O
- Molar mass: 321.424 g·mol^{−1}
- 3D model (JSmol): Interactive image
- SMILES: O=C(N1CCCC1)[C@@H]4C=C3c5cccc2c5c(c[nH]2)C[C@H]3N(C4)C
- InChI: InChI=1S/C20H23N3O/c1-22-12-14(20(24)23-7-2-3-8-23)9-16-15-5-4-6-17-19(15)13(11-21-17)10-18(16)22/h4-6,9,11,14,18,21H,2-3,7-8,10,12H2,1H3/t14-,18-/m1/s1; Key:SETDYMMXQQXCRP-RDTXWAMCSA-N

N-Pyrrolidyllysergamide (LPD-824), also known as lysergic acid pyrrolidide (LA-Pyr), is a psychedelic drug of the lysergamide family related to lysergic acid diethylamide (LSD). It is the analogue of LSD in which the N,N-diethylamide moiety has been cyclized into an N,N-pyrrolidide ring.

== Use and effects ==
The drug has been reported to have mild and relatively short-lasting LSD-like effects in humans at an oral dose of 800 μg equivalent to one-tenth this amount of LSD (i.e., 80 μg). Based on different clinical studies, it is estimated to be 5 to 10% as potent as LSD in humans. Its duration was shorter than that of LSD, lasting around 5 hours as opposed to 7 hours in the case of LSD. The drug produced nausea at small doses in humans, which was dose-limiting in terms of evaluating its effects.

== Pharmacology ==
=== Pharmacodynamics ===
LPD-824 is known to be a serotonin receptor modulator, including of the serotonin 5-HT_{2A} receptor, where it acted as a partial agonist with about 17-fold lower potency than LSD but an efficacy slightly higher than that of LSD in terms of phosphatidylinositol (PI) hydrolysis. It also showed affinities for the serotonin 5-HT_{2C} and 5-HT_{1A} receptors similar to those of LSD.

It had about 5 to 10% of the potency of LSD in preclinical studies with animals, for instance in terms of serotonin antagonism in the rat uterus and hyperthermia in rabbits. It is described as a very strong hypotensive agent in animals. In subsequent rodent drug discrimination tests, LPD-824 fully substituted for LSD, albeit with only about 16 to 25% of the potency.

== History ==
LPD-824 was first described in the scientific literature by Albert Hofmann and colleagues by 1955.

== Society and culture ==
=== Legal status ===
==== Canada ====
LPD-824 is not a controlled substance in Canada as of 2025.

==== United States ====
LPD-824 is not an explicitly controlled substance in the United States. However, it could be considered a controlled substance under the Federal Analogue Act if intended for human consumption.

== See also ==
- Substituted lysergamide
- Lysergic acid pyrrolinide (LPN)
- Lysergic acid morpholide (LSM-775)
- Lysergic acid piperidide (LSD-Pip)
- Lysergic acid azepane (LA-Azepane)
- Lysergic acid 2,4-dimethylazetidide (LA-SS-Az, LSZ)
