= List of SGT cannabinoids =

Many synthetic cannabinoids were designed by Stargate International, a now defunct New Zealand company in the 2000s and 2010s, and feature an alphanumeric code beginning with the prefix "SGT". PB-22 (SGT-21) is credited with being the first synthetic cannabinoid to feature a quinoline substructure with an ester linker at the indole 3-position. The mainly N-cumyl-indazole-3-carboxamide derivatives are best known. Many SGT compounds are banned as designer drugs in various jurisdictions, such as Japan.

== Chemical structures of SGT cannabinoid compounds ==
| Structure | Name | Chemical name | CAS # | PubChem |
|---|---|---|---|---|
| | SGT-4 (CHM-081) | [1-(cyclohexylmethyl)indol-3-yl]-(4-methoxynaphthalen-1-yl)methanone | 1373876–34–6 | 118796420 |
| | SGT-13 (2F-QMPSB) | 8-quinolinyl 4-methyl-3-[(4,4-difluoropiperidin-1-yl)sulfonyl]benzoate | 2707165–48–6 | 155884739 |
| | SGT-14 (EAM-2201) | (4-Ethyl-1-naphthalenyl)[1-(5-fluoropentyl)-1H-indol-3-yl]-methanone | 1364933–60–7 | 71308187 |
| | SGT-17 (THJ-018) | 1-Naphthalenyl(1-pentyl-1H-indazol-3-yl)-methanone | 1364933–55–0 | 124518671 |
| | SGT-20 (5F-JWH-398) | (4-Chloronaphthalen-1-yl)-[1-(5-fluoropentyl)indol-3-yl]methanone | 1391486–12–6 | 125181332 |
| | SGT-21 (PB-22, QUPIC) | 1-Pentyl-1H-indole-3-carboxylic acid 8-quinolinyl ester | 1400742–17–7 | 71604304 |
| | SGT-24 (CUMYL-PINACA) | 1-pentyl-N-(2-phenylpropan-2-yl)-1H-indazole-3-carboxamide | 1400742–15–5 | 86273676 |
| | SGT-25 (5F-CUMYL-PINACA) | 1-(5-Fluoropentyl)-N-(2-phenylpropan-2-yl)-1H-indazole-3-carboxamide | 1400742–16–6 | 86274158 |
| | SGT-32 (BB-22, QUCHIC) | 1-(cyclohexylmethyl)-1H-indole-3-carboxylic acid 8-quinolinyl ester | 1400742–42–8 | 71711120 |
| | SGT-37 (A-CHMINACA) | N-(1-adamantyl)-1-(cyclohexylmethyl)indazole-3-carboxamide | 1400742–33–7 | 137700313 |
| | SGT-40 (Adamantyl-THPINACA isomer 1) | N-(1-Adamantyl)-1-(tetrahydropyran-4-ylmethyl)indazole-3-carboxamide | 1400742–48–4 | 129532625 |
| | SGT-42 (CUMYL-THPINACA) | 1-(oxan-4-ylmethyl)-N-(2-phenylpropan-2-yl)indazole-3-carboxamide | 1400742–50–8 | 86273679 |
| | SGT-48 (PTI-1) | N,N-diethyl-N-((2-(1-pentyl-1H-indol-3-yl)thiazol-4-yl)methyl)ethanamine | 1400742–46–2 | 124037378 |
| | SGT-49 (PTI-2) | N-(2-methoxyethyl)-N-((2-(1-pentyl-1H-indol-3-yl)thiazol-4-yl)methyl)propan-2-amine | 1400742–45–1 | 124037377 |
| | SGT-55 (CUMYL-BICA) | 1-butyl-N-(2-phenylpropan-2-yl)-1H-indole-3-carboxamide | 1400742–22–4 | 86273677 |
| | SGT-56 (CUMYL-PICA) | 1-pentyl-N-(2-phenylpropan-2-yl)-1H-indole-3-carboxamide | 1400742–32–6 | 86273678 |
| | SGT-64 (4'F-CUMYL-5F-PICA) | 1-(5-fluoropentyl)-N-[2-(4-fluorophenyl)propan-2-yl]indole-3-carboxamide | 1631074–52–6 | 117650357 |
| | SGT-65 (4'F-CUMYL-5F-PINACA) | 1-(5-fluoropentyl)-N-[2-(4-fluorophenyl)propan-2-yl]indazole-3-carboxamide | 1631074–53–7 | 117650358 |
| | SGT-78 (CUMYL-4CN-BINACA) | 1-(4-Cyanobutyl)-N-(2-phenylpropan-2-yl)-1H-indazole-3-carboxamide | 1631074–54–8 | 117650402 |
| | SGT-88 (THQ-PINACA) | 3,4-dihydro-2H-quinolin-1-yl-(1-pentylindazol-3-yl)methanone | 2950480–11–0 | 165361626 |
| | SGT-149 (CUMYL-FUBINACA) | 1-[(4-fluorophenyl)methyl]-N-(2-phenylpropan-2-yl)indazole-3-carboxamide | 1631074–58–2 | 117650352 |
| | SGT-151 (CUMYL-PEGACLONE) | 2,5-Dihydro-2-(1-methyl-1-phenylethyl)-5-pentyl-1H-pyrido[4,3-b]indol-1-one | 2160555–55–3 | 134818034 |
| | SGT-152 (CUMYL-NBMINACA) | [1-(bicyclo[2.2.1]heptan-2-yl)methyl]-N-(2-phenylpropan-2-yl)-1H-indazole-3-carboxamide | 1631074–60–6 | 117650372 |
| | SGT-157 (4'Cl-CUMYL-PINACA) | N-[2-(4-chlorophenyl)propan-2-yl]-1-pentylindazole-3-carboxamide | 1631074–65–1 | 86274160 |
| | SGT-194 (Adamantyl-THPINACA isomer 2) | N-(2-Adamantyl)-1-(tetrahydropyran-4-ylmethyl)indazole-3-carboxamide | 2365471–86–7 | 123132009 |
| | SGT-263 (5F-CUMYL-P7AICA) | 1-(5-Fluoropentyl)-N-(2-phenylpropan-2-yl)pyrrolo[2,3-b]pyridine-3-carboxamide | 2171492–36–5 | 129532613 |
| | SGT-270 (CUMYL-CH-MEGACLONE) | 2,5-Dihydro-2-(1-methyl-1-phenylethyl)-5-(cyclohexylmethyl)-1H-pyrido[4,3-b]indol-1-one | 2813950–07–9 | 155884822 |
| | SGT-271 (CUMYL-BC-HPMEGACLONE) | 5-({Bicyclo[2.2.1]heptan-2-yl}methyl)-2-(2-phenylpropan-2-yl)-1H,2H,5H-pyrido[4,3-b]indol-1-one | | 163190698 |
| | SGT-273 (CUMYL-CBMEGACLONE) | 2,5-Dihydro-2-(1-methyl-1-phenylethyl)-5-(cyclobutylmethyl)-1H-pyrido[4,3-b]indol-1-one | 2806439–13–2 | 155884737 |
| | SGT-277 (CUMYL-CBMINACA) | 1-(cyclobutylmethyl)-N-(2-phenylpropan-2-yl)indazole-3-carboxamide | 3001262–62–7 | 155884799 |
| | SGT-280 (CUMYL-CBMICA) | 1-(cyclobutylmethyl)-N-(2-phenylpropan-2-yl)indole-3-carboxamide | 2571070–88–5 | 155884426 |

== See also ==
- List of AM cannabinoids
- List of CP cannabinoids
- List of HU cannabinoids
- List of JWH cannabinoids
- List of miscellaneous designer cannabinoids
