= List of miscellaneous designer cannabinoids =

Since the first synthetic cannabinoids were discovered in recreational drug products in 2008, new synthetic cannabinoids with no precedent in the scientific literature continue to be identified. These synthetic cannabinoids appear to be rationally designed by clandestine medicinal chemists. These unprecedented synthetic cannabinoids often feature alphanumeric code names intended to mimic the style of chemical nomenclature used by academic laboratories and pharmaceutical companies, and there is generally little, if any, information available regarding their pharmacology and toxicology at the time of first discovery.

- 5F-AB-PINACA — the terminally fluorinated (5-fluoropentyl) analogue of AB-PINACA.
- 5F-AMB —
- 5F-ADB —
- 5F-NNE1 —
- 5F-PCN —
- 5F-SDB-006 — the terminally fluorinated (5-fluoropentyl) analogue of SDB-006.
- AB-001 — one of the earliest adamantane derivatives discovered as a designer cannabinoid. AB-001 was unknown in the scientific literature at the time of its discovery, and has since been characterized as a CB_{1} and CB_{2} agonist with weak cannabimimetic activity in rats.
- AB-005 —
- AB-CHMINACA —
- ADAMANTYL-THPINACA —
- AMB-FUBINACA
- APICA — also known as 2NE1 and SDB-001, APICA is the carboxamide analogue of AB-001 and was similarly unknown in the scientific literature at the time of its discovery. Like AB-001, APICA is a CB_{1} and CB_{2} agonist possessing moderate cannabimimetic potency in rats.
- APINACA — also known as AKB-48. APINACA is the indazole analogue of APICA.
- BB-22 —
- BIM-018 — also known as JWH-018 benzimidazole analogue, is a 1,2-disubstituted benzimidazole analogue of JWH-018.
- FAB-144 — the indazole analogue of XLR-11.
- FDU-NNE1
- FUB-144 — the N-(4-fluorobenzyl) analogue of UR-144 and XLR-11.
- FUBIMINA — the terminally fluorinated (5-fluoro) analogue of BIM-018.
- MDMB-CHMICA
- MDMB-FUBINACA
- MMB-2201
- MN-18 — the indazole analogue of NNE1.
- NM-2201 —
- NNE1 — also known as NNEI, MN-24 and AM-6527, is the carboxamide analogue of JWH-018. NNE1 was first described in a paper by Abbott Laboratories in 2011.
- PB-22 —
- PX-1 —
- PX-2 —
- PX-3 —
- SDB-005 —
- SDB-006 — is a benzylic analogue of APICA, and was discovered during research related to AB-001 and APICA.
- STS-135 — the terminally fluorinated (5-fluoro) analogue of APICA. STS-135 is believed to be named after the STS-135 jet propulsion system, and functions as an agonist at CB_{1} and CB_{2} receptors.
- THJ-018 — the indazole analogue of JWH-018.
- THJ-2201 — the indazole analogue of AM-2201.
- WIN 55,212-2 —
- XLR-11 — the terminally fluorinated (5-fluoro) analogue of UR-144.
- XLR-12 — the terminally trifluorinated (4,4,4-trifluorobutyl) analogue of UR-144.

== See also ==
- List of AM cannabinoids
- List of CP cannabinoids
- List of HU cannabinoids
- List of JWH cannabinoids
- List of SGT cannabinoids
