= CUMYL-4CN-BINACA =

Chemical compound

Legal status
- Legal status: AU: S9 (Prohibited substance); BR: Class F2 (Prohibited psychotropics); CA: Schedule II; DE: Anlage II (Authorized trade only, not prescriptible); UK: Class B; US: Schedule I; UN: Psychotropic Schedule II

Identifiers
- IUPAC name: 1-(4-Cyanobutyl)-N-(2-phenylpropan-2-yl)-1H-indazole-3-carboxamide
- CAS Number: 1631074-54-8
- PubChem CID: 117650402
- ChemSpider: 58190345
- UNII: V6DM582RV1
- KEGG: C22722
- CompTox Dashboard (EPA): DTXSID401009982

Chemical and physical data
- Formula: C_{22}H_{24}N_{4}O
- Molar mass: 360.461 g·mol^{−1}
- 3D model (JSmol): Interactive image
- SMILES: O=C(NC(C)(C)C1=CC=CC=C1)C2=NN(CCCCC#N)C3=C2C=CC=C3
- InChI: InChI=1S/C22H24N4O/c1-22(2,17-11-5-3-6-12-17)24-21(27)20-18-13-7-8-14-19(18)26(25-20)16-10-4-9-15-23/h3,5-8,11-14H,4,9-10,16H2,1-2H3,(H,24,27); Key:JGTSOWOPISVAHG-UHFFFAOYSA-N

CUMYL-4CN-BINACA (also known as CUMYL-CYBINACA or SGT-78) is an indazole-3-carboxamide based synthetic cannabinoid that has been sold online as a designer drug. It is a potent agonist for cannabinoid receptors CB_{1} and CB_{2}, with in vitro EC_{50} values of 0.58 nM and 6.12 nM, respectively. In mice, CUMYL-4CN-BINACA produces hypothermic and pro-convulsant effects via the CB_{1} receptor, and anecdotal reports suggest it has an active dose of around 0.1 mg in humans.

CUMYL-4CN-BINACA is metabolized to produce cyanide, raising concerns about liver toxicity. There is one reported case of hyperthermia, rhabdomyolysis, and kidney failure associated with its use.

== See also ==
- 4CN-AMB-BUTINACA
- 5F-CUMYL-PINACA
- 5F-SDB-006
- ADAMANTYL-THPINACA
- CUMYL-PICA
- CUMYL-PINACA
- CUMYL-THPINACA
- SDB-006
- NNE1
