= CUMYL-PEGACLONE =

Chemical compound

Legal status
- Legal status: BR: Class F2 (Prohibited psychotropics); CA: Schedule II; DE: Anlage II (Authorized trade only, not prescriptible); UK: Under Psychoactive Substances Act; UN: Psychotropic Schedule II

Identifiers
- IUPAC name: 2,5-Dihydro-2-(1-methyl-1-phenylethyl)-5-pentyl-1H-pyrido[4,3-b]indol-1-one
- CAS Number: 2160555-55-3
- PubChem CID: 134818034
- ChemSpider: 68003813
- UNII: CUT2RV7EIQ
- KEGG: C22782

Chemical and physical data
- Formula: C_{25}H_{28}N_{2}O
- Molar mass: 372.512 g·mol^{−1}
- 3D model (JSmol): Interactive image
- SMILES: CC(C1=CC=CC=C1)(C)N2C=CC(N(CCCCC)C3=C4C=CC=C3)=C4C2=O
- InChI: InChI=1S/C25H28N2O/c1-4-5-11-17-26-21-15-10-9-14-20(21)23-22(26)16-18-27(24(23)28); Key:AWHWTKXMUJLSRM-UHFFFAOYSA-N

CUMYL-PEGACLONE (SGT-151) is a gamma-carboline based synthetic cannabinoid that has been sold as a designer drug. The gamma-carboline core structure seen in CUMYL-PEGACLONE had not previously been encountered in a designer cannabinoid, though it is similar in structure to other gamma-carboline cannabinoids disclosed by Bristol-Myers Squibb in 2001.

== Legal status ==
Sweden's public health agency classified CUMYL-PEGACLONE as a narcotic substance, on January 18, 2019.

In the United States, the DEA has temporarily placed CUMYL-PEGACLONE into Schedule I status starting on December 12, 2023, for up to 2 years. On December 11, 2025, DEA filed for permanent placement of CUMYL-PEGACLONE into Schedule I. A 30-day public comment period on the proposal will close on 1/12/26.

== See also ==
- 5F-CUMYL-PEGACLONE
- CUMYL-CB-MEGACLONE
- CUMYL-CH-MEGACLONE
- CUMYL-BC-HPMEGACLONE-221
- CUMYL-PINACA
- CUMYL-5F-P7AICA
- UR-12
