= CUMYL-3TMS-PRINACA =

Chemical compound

Identifiers
- IUPAC name: N-(2-phenylpropan-2-yl)-1-(3-(trimethylsilyl)propyl)-1H-indazole-3-carboxamide
- PubChem CID: 172871887

Chemical and physical data
- Formula: C_{23}H_{31}N_{3}OSi
- Molar mass: 393.606 g·mol^{−1}
- 3D model (JSmol): Interactive image
- SMILES: C[Si](C)(C)CCCn1nc(C(=O)NC(C)(C)c2ccccc2)c2ccccc12
- InChI: InChI=1S/C23H31N3OSi/c1-23(2,18-12-7-6-8-13-18)24-22(27)21-19-14-9-10-15-20(19)26(25-21)16-11-17-28(3,4)5/h6-10,12-15H,11,16-17H2,1-5H3,(H,24,27); Key:BFLYAEBVCZMSPK-UHFFFAOYSA-N

CUMYL-3TMS-PRINACA is an indazole-3-carboxamide based synthetic cannabinoid receptor agonist that has been sold as a designer drug, first identified in Sweden in May 2023. Along with the related compound ADMB-3TMS-PRINACA that was reported several months earlier, CUMYL-3TMS-PRINACA is one of the only psychoactive drugs ever reported that contains a silicon atom. Another example of a silicon-containing drug is sila-haloperidol.

== Legality ==
CUMYL-3TMS-PRINACA is illegal in Germany and Italy and has been recommended for control in Sweden.

== See also ==
- CUMYL-CBMINACA
- CUMYL-FUBINACA
- CUMYL-NBMINACA
- CUMYL-PINACA
- CUMYL-THPINACA
- 1S-LSD
- Silandrone
