= APINAC =

Chemical compound

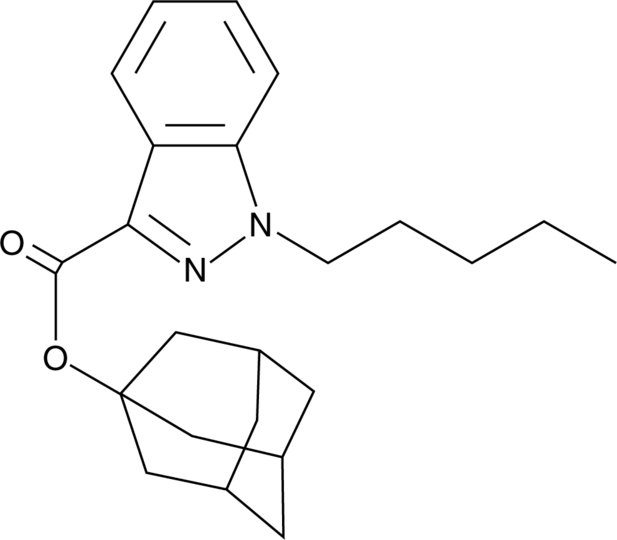

Clinical data
- Other names: AKB-57, AKB57

Legal status
- Legal status: BR: Class F2 (Prohibited psychotropics); CA: Schedule II; DE: Anlage II (Authorized trade only, not prescriptible); NZ: Temporary Class; UK: Class B; US: Schedule I; Also illegal in Czech Republic, Japan, Latvia, and Singapore

Identifiers
- IUPAC name: N-(1-Adamantyl)-1-pentylindazole-3-carboxylate
- CAS Number: 2219331-93-6
- PubChem CID: 129532609
- ChemSpider: 59718662
- UNII: LV8ML24A9K
- CompTox Dashboard (EPA): DTXSID801342415

Chemical and physical data
- Formula: C_{23}H_{31}N_{2}O_{2}
- Molar mass: 367.513 g·mol^{−1}
- 3D model (JSmol): Interactive image
- SMILES: CCCCCn1nc(C(=O)OC23CC4CC(CC(C4)C2)C3)c2ccccc21
- InChI: InChI=1S/C23H30N2O2/c1-2-3-6-9-25-20-8-5-4-7-19(20)21(24-25)22(26)27-23-13-16-10-17(14-23)12-18(11-16)15-23/h4-5,7-8,16-18H,2-3,6,9-15H2,1H3; Key:KCCVWUAAHDXNNQ-UHFFFAOYSA-N

APINAC (AKB-57, N-(1-adamantyl)-1-pentylindazole-3-carboxylate) is a drug that acts as an agonist for the cannabinoid receptors. It was detected in Slovenia in 2016 and is on the UNODC list of synthetic cannabinoids.

== Legality ==
APINAC is covered by the UK blanket ban on synthetic cannabinoids.

== Detection ==
APINAC can be bought by labs as a reference standard. APINAC metabolizes to N-pentylindazole-3-carboxylic acid, hydroxylated N-pentylindrazole-3-carboxylic acid, and 1-adamantanol in rats.

== See also ==
- 5F-AB-PINACA
- 5F-ADB
- 5F-AMB
- 5F-APINACA
- 5F-CUMYL-PINACA
- AB-CHFUPYCA
- AB-CHMINACA
- AB-FUBINACA
- AB-PINACA
- ADAMANTYL-THPINACA
- ADB-CHMINACA
- ADB-FUBINACA
- ADB-PINACA
- ADBICA
- APICA
- FUB-APINACA
- MDMB-CHMICA
- PX-3
- SDB-001
- STS-135
- Synthetic cannabinoid
- Synthetic cannabis
