= C22H26FN3O =

The molecular formula C_{22}H_{26}FN_{3}O (molar mass: 367.460 g/mol, exact mass: 367.2060 u) may refer to:

- 5F-CUMYL-P7AICA
- 5F-CUMYL-PINACA (SGT-25)
