= CUMYL-CB-MEGACLONE =

Designer drug

Legal status
- Legal status: UK: Under Psychoactive Substances Act

Identifiers
- IUPAC name: 2,5-Dihydro-2-(1-methyl-1-phenylethyl)-5-(cyclobutylmethyl)-1H-pyrido[4,3-b]indol-1-one
- CAS Number: 2806439-13-2
- PubChem CID: 155884737
- UNII: U43QX7LH63

Chemical and physical data
- Formula: C_{25}H_{26}N_{2}O
- Molar mass: 370.496 g·mol^{−1}
- 3D model (JSmol): Interactive image
- SMILES: CC(C)(c1ccccc1)N5C=Cc4n(CC2CCC2)c3ccccc3c4C5=O
- InChI: InChI=1S/C25H26N2O/c1-25(2,19-11-4-3-5-12-19)27-16-15-22-23(24(27)28)20-13-6-7-14-21(20)26(22)17-18-9-8-10-18/h3-7,11-16,18H,8-10,17H2,1-2H; Key:XABXFXHKUHKHFO-UHFFFAOYSA-N

CUMYL-CB-MEGACLONE (CUMYL-CBMGACLONE, SGT-273) is a gamma-carboline based synthetic cannabinoid receptor agonist that has been sold as a designer drug, first being identified in Hungary in April 2020.

== See also ==
- 5F-CUMYL-PEGACLONE
- CUMYL-5F-P7AICA
- CUMYL-CH-MEGACLONE
- CUMYL-BC-HPMEGACLONE-221
- CUMYL-CBMINACA
- CUMYL-THPINACA
