= 4'Cl-CUMYL-PINACA =

Chemical compound

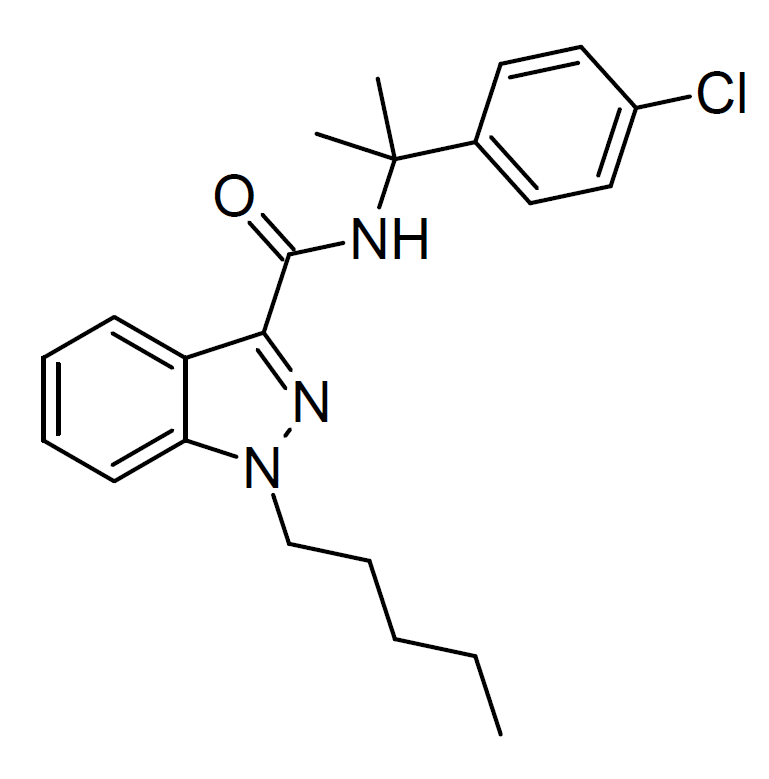

Legal status
- Legal status: CA: Schedule II; DE: NpSG (Industrial and scientific use only); UK: Class B

Identifiers
- IUPAC name: N-[2-(4-chlorophenyl)propan-2-yl]-1-pentylindazole-3-carboxamide
- CAS Number: 1631074-65-1
- PubChem CID: 86274160
- ChemSpider: 71117114
- CompTox Dashboard (EPA): DTXSID001345334

Chemical and physical data
- Formula: C_{22}H_{26}ClN_{3}O
- Molar mass: 383.92 g·mol^{−1}
- 3D model (JSmol): Interactive image
- SMILES: CCCCCN1C2=CC=CC=C2C(=N1)C(=O)NC(C)(C)C3=CC=C(C=C3)Cl
- InChI: InChI=1S/C22H26ClN3O/c1-4-5-8-15-26-19-10-7-6-9-18(19)20(25-26)21(27)24-22(2,3)16-11-13-17(23)14-12-16/h6-7,9-14H,4-5,8,15H2,1-3H3,(H,24,27); Key:APEGZJKYOJZGKH-UHFFFAOYSA-N

4'Cl-CUMYL-PINACA (also known as SGT-157) is an indazole-3-carboxamide based synthetic cannabinoid compound, first disclosed in a 2014 patent. It has been sold as a designer drug, first reported in 2020 alongside two similar compounds 4'F-CUMYL-5F-PICA (SGT-64) and 4'F-CUMYL-5F-PINACA (SGT-65), and the metabolism of these compounds has been studied to assist with their identification in forensic casework.

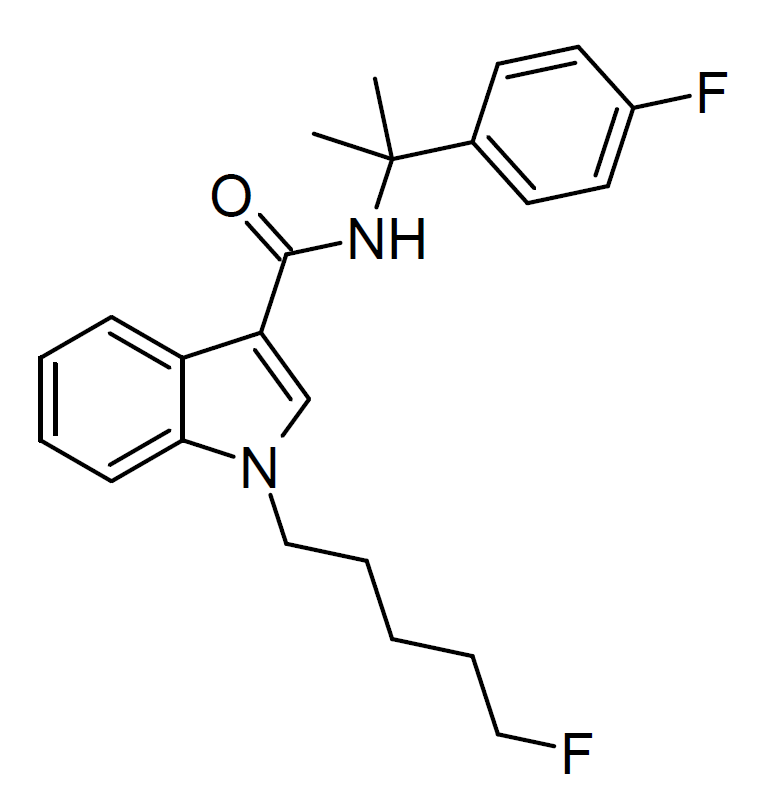
4'F-CUMYL-5F-PICA (SGT-64), CAS# 1631074-52-6

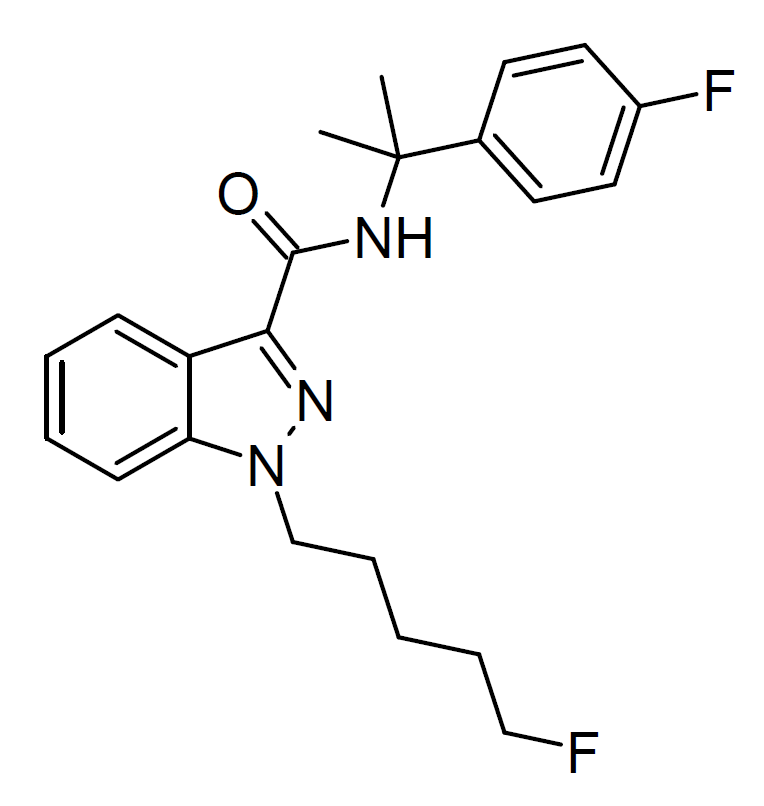
4'F-CUMYL-5F-PINACA (SGT-65), CAS# 1631074-53-7

== See also ==
- 5F-CUMYL-PINACA
- CUMYL-FUBINACA
- CUMYL-PINACA
