= 1S-LSD =

Chemical compound, Novel psychoactive substance analog, LSD prodrug

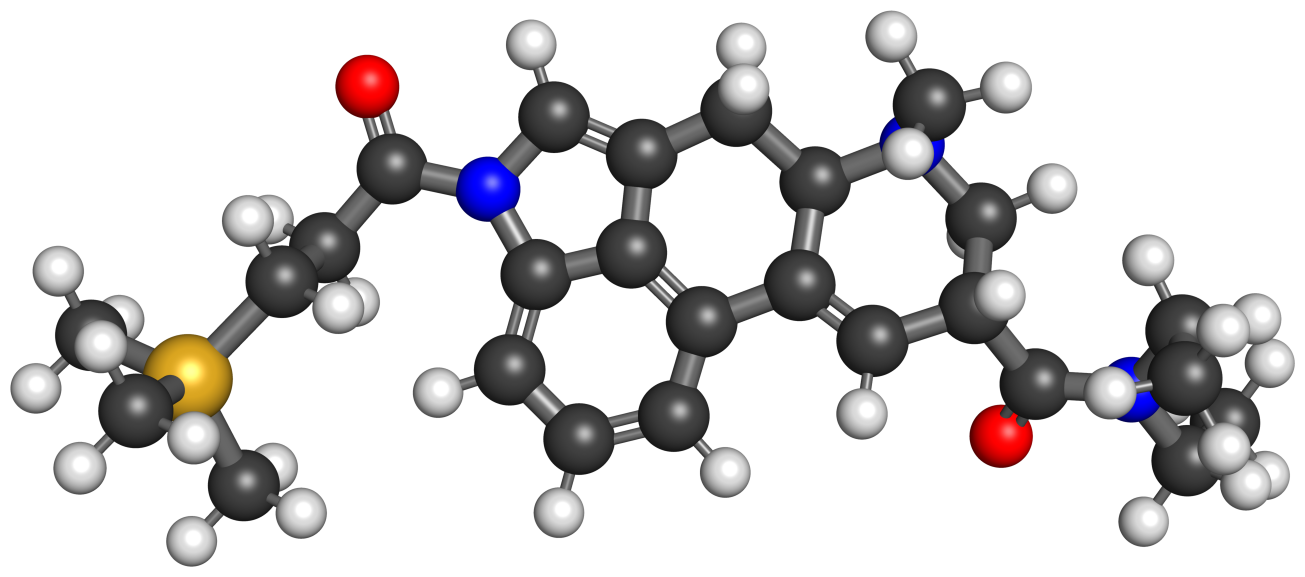

Clinical data
- Other names: 1-(3-(Trimethylsilyl)propionyl)-LSD; 1-[3-(Trimethylsilyl)propanoyl]-LSD; (8β)-1-(3-(Trimethylsilyl)propionyl)-N,N-diethyl-6-methyl-9,10-didehydroergoline-8-carboxamide; X-LSD
- Routes of administration: Oral, Sublingual
- Drug class: Serotonergic psychedelic; Hallucinogen
- ATC code: None

Legal status
- Legal status: DE: NpSG (Industrial and scientific use only)

Identifiers
- IUPAC name: (6aR,9R)-N,N-diethyl-7-methyl-4-(3-trimethylsilylpropanoyl)-6,6a,8,9-tetrahydroindolo[4,3-fg]quinoline-9-carboxamide
- PubChem CID: 172875719

Chemical and physical data
- Formula: C_{26}H_{37}N_{3}O_{2}Si
- Molar mass: 451.686 g·mol^{−1}
- 3D model (JSmol): Interactive image
- SMILES: C[Si](CCC(=O)N1C=C2C[C@H]3N(C[C@@H](C=C3C=3C=CC=C1C32)C(=O)N(CC)CC)C)(C)C
- InChI: InChI=1S/C26H37N3O2Si/c1-7-28(8-2)26(31)19-14-21-20-10-9-11-22-25(20)18(15-23(21)27(3)16-19)17-29(22)24(30)12-13-32(4,5)6/h9-11,14,17,19,23H,7-8,12-13,15-16H2,1-6H3/t19-,23-/m1/s1; Key:RYNRSMKGPSUXLC-AUSIDOKSSA-N

1S-LSD, also known as 1-(3-(trimethylsilyl)propionyl)-LSD, is a psychedelic drug of the lysergamide family related to lysergic acid diethylamide (LSD). It is the trimethylsilyl derivative of 1P-LSD and functions as a prodrug and functional analogue of LSD. 1S-LSD was developed in response to legal restrictions on similar compounds, such as 1D-LSD, which were banned in Germany under the NpSG law in June 2024.

The compound was introduced as a legal alternative by incorporating a trimethylsilyl group, which is not covered under current NpSG regulations. This chemical modification allows 1S-LSD to be legally sold in Germany as of September 2024. It is typically distributed in its hemi-D-tartrate form, a common format for lysergamides due to its stability and ease of use.

== Use and effects ==
The dose of 1S-LSD is reported to be similar to that of LSD. Blotter tabs containing 129 μg 1S-LSD have been encountered. 1S-LSD is thought to be a prodrug and produces similar effects as LSD and other LSD prodrugs.

== Pharmacology ==
=== Pharmacodynamics ===
While specific studies on 1S-LSD are limited due to its recent introduction, it is presumed to share pharmacological properties with LSD and its analogues. These substances typically act as partial agonists at serotonin receptors, particularly the serotonin 5-HT_{2A} receptor, which is responsible for their hallucinogenic effects. The addition of the trimethylsilyl group in 1S-LSD is thought to slightly alter its binding affinity and metabolic profile, although empirical data is still needed.

== Chemistry ==
1S-LSD belongs to the lysergamide class of compounds, which are characterized by the ergoline structure derived from lysergic acid. The compound is closely related to LSD and 1P-LSD but differs by the addition of a trimethylsilyl group on the propionyl chain.

The nitrogen atom in the polycyclic indole group of the ergoline structure is a common site for chemical modifications, as it is highly reactive and accessible for various reactions. These modifications often include alkylations, acylations, Mannich reactions, and Michael additions. Such alterations are frequently explored in the synthesis of new analogues to modify pharmacological properties or evade legal controls. The addition of the trimethylsilyl group in 1S-LSD represents a strategic modification designed to keep the substance outside the coverage of Germany's New Psychoactive Substances Act (NpSG). Despite these changes, 1S-LSD likely retains a pharmacological profile similar to that of LSD, acting primarily as a serotonergic hallucinogen.

=== Analogues ===
Analogues of 1S-LSD include 1P-LSD, 1D-LSD, 1T-LSD, 1V-LSD, 1cP-LSD, and 1BP-LSD, among others.

== Society and culture ==
=== Legal status ===
==== Canada ====
1S-LSD is not a controlled substance in Canada as of 2025.

==== Germany ====
As of August 2024, 1S-LSD remains legal in Germany, primarily due to the fact that its unique silicon-containing structural alteration circumvent the legislative controls imposed by the NpSG law. The legal status of 1S-LSD in Germany is likely subject to change with future amendments to the NpSG, similarly to its previously banned sister compounds 1V-LSD and 1D-LSD. However, it is anticipated that 1S-LSD will remain legal at least until mid-2025. An update on the 21st of November 2025 added 1S-LSD to the "NpSG" made the sale illegal in Germany ("sechste Verordnung zur Änderung der Anlage des Neue-psychoaktive-Stoffe-Gesetzes (NpSG)").

==== United States ====
1S-LSD is not an explicitly controlled substance in the United States. However, it could be considered a controlled substance under the Federal Analogue Act if intended for human consumption.

==== Other countries ====
The legal status of 1S-LSD outside of Germany is not well-documented. Given its structural similarity to LSD, it may be considered a controlled substance analogue in jurisdictions like the United States, where laws like the Federal Analogue Act could apply. Potential users and researchers should verify the legal status of 1S-LSD in their respective countries before acquisition or use.

== See also ==
- Substituted lysergamide
- ADMB-3TMS-PRINACA
- CUMYL-3TMS-PRINACA
- Silandrone
- Lizard Labs
