= C25H29N3O =

The molecular formula C_{25}H_{29}N_{3}O (Molar mass: 387.527 g/mol) may refer to:

- CUMYL-NBMINACA
- Nufenoxole
