= CUMYL-CH-MEGACLONE =

Chemical compound

Legal status
- Legal status: CA: Schedule II; DE: NpSG (Industrial and scientific use only); UK: Under Psychoactive Substances Act

Identifiers
- IUPAC name: 2,5-Dihydro-2-(1-methyl-1-phenylethyl)-5-(cyclohexylmethyl)-1H-pyrido[4,3-b]indol-1-one
- CAS Number: 2813950-07-9
- PubChem CID: 155884822
- ChemSpider: 97091815
- UNII: 9QA3AM2G3T

Chemical and physical data
- Formula: C_{27}H_{30}N_{2}O
- Molar mass: 398.550 g·mol^{−1}
- 3D model (JSmol): Interactive image
- SMILES: CC(C)(C1=CC=CC=C1)N2C=CC3=C(C2=O)C4=CC=CC=C4N3CC5CCCCC5
- InChI: InChI=1S/C27H30N2O/c1-27(2,21-13-7-4-8-14-21)29-18-17-24-25(26(29)30)22-15-9-10-16-23(22)28(24)19-20-11-5-3-6-12-20/h4,7-10,13-18,20H,3,5-6,11-12,19H2,1-2H3; Key:CGHCGYCTOLWAPL-UHFFFAOYSA-N

CUMYL-CH-MEGACLONE (CUMYL-CHMGACLONE, SGT-270) is a gamma-carboline based synthetic cannabinoid receptor agonist that has been sold as a designer drug, first being identified in Hungary in December 2018.

== See also ==
- 5F-CUMYL-PEGACLONE
- CUMYL-5F-P7AICA
- CUMYL-CB-MEGACLONE
- CUMYL-BC-HPMEGACLONE-221
- CUMYL-CBMINACA
- CUMYL-THPINACA
