= C23H26N2O =

The molecular formula C_{23}H_{26}N_{2}O (molar mass : 346.474 g/mol) may refer to:

- Roxindole
- CUMYL-CBMICA (SGT-280)
