= 5F-PCN =

Chemical compound

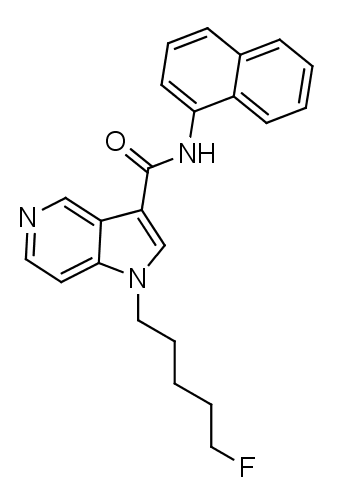

Legal status
- Legal status: CA: Schedule II; UK: Class B

Identifiers
- IUPAC name: 1-(5-fluoropentyl)-N-(naphthalen-1-yl)-1H-pyrrolo[3,2-c]pyridine-3-carboxamide
- CAS Number: 2219332-48-4
- PubChem CID: 125181244
- ChemSpider: 34450856
- UNII: Q7GH2GGJ3E
- CompTox Dashboard (EPA): DTXSID901032641

Chemical and physical data
- Formula: C_{23}H_{22}FN_{3}O
- Molar mass: 375.447 g·mol^{−1}
- 3D model (JSmol): Interactive image
- SMILES: O=C(NC1=C(C=CC=C2)C2=CC=C1)C3=CN(CCCCCF)C4=C3C=NC=C4
- InChI: InChI=1S/C23H22FN3O/c24-12-4-1-5-14-27-16-20(19-15-25-13-11-22(19)27)23(28)26-21-10-6-8-17-7-2-3-9-18(17)21/h2-3,6-11,13,15-16H,1,4-5,12,14H2,(H,26,28); Key:BRRZRRZUERBDQL-UHFFFAOYSA-N

5F-PCN (also known as 5F-MN-21) is an azaindole-based synthetic cannabinoid that is presumed to be a potent agonist of the CB_{1} receptor and has been sold online as a designer drug. It is closely related to NNE1. Given the known metabolic liberation (and presence as an impurity) of amantadine in the related compound APINACA, it is suspected that metabolic hydrolysis of the amide group of 5F-PCN may release 1-naphthylamine, a known carcinogen.

== Legal status ==
Sweden's public health agency suggested to classify 5F-PCN as hazardous substance on November 10, 2014.

== See also ==
- 5F-NNE1
- AM-2201
- APICA
- CUMYL-PICA
- CUMYL-5F-P7AICA
- JWH-018
- NM-2201
- SDB-005
