= ADMB-3TMS-PRINACA =

Designer drug

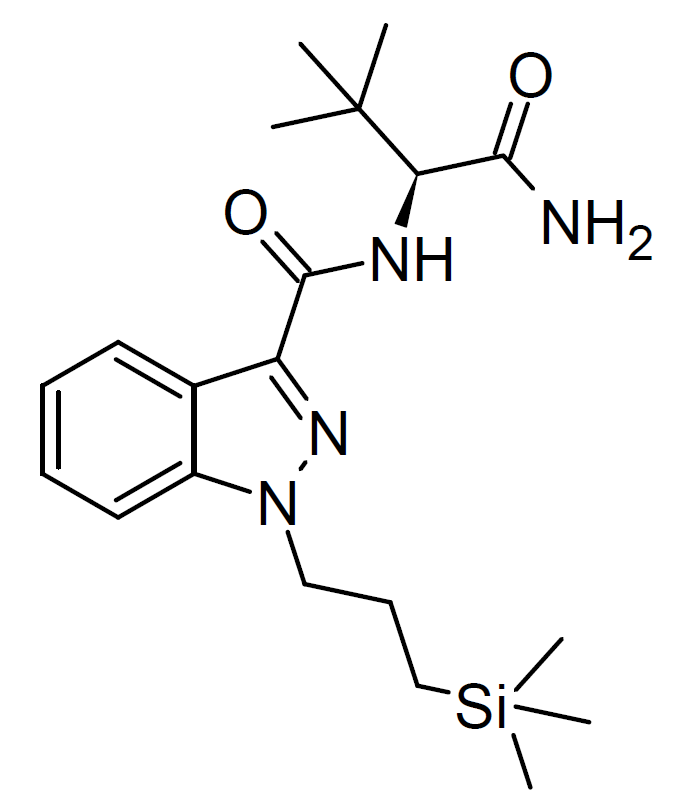

Identifiers
- IUPAC name: N-(1-amino-3,3-dimethyl-1-oxobutan-2-yl)-1-(3-(trimethylsilyl)propyl)-1H-indazole-3-carboxamide
- PubChem CID: 172871875

Chemical and physical data
- Formula: C_{20}H_{32}N_{4}O_{2}Si
- Molar mass: 388.587 g·mol^{−1}
- 3D model (JSmol): Interactive image
- SMILES: C[Si](C)(C)CCCn1nc(C(=O)N[C@H](C(=O)N)C(C)(C)C)c2ccccc12
- InChI: InChI=1S/C20H32N4O2Si/c1-20(2,3)17(18(21)25)22-19(26)16-14-10-7-8-11-15(14)24(23-16)12-9-13-27(4,5)6/h7-8,10-11,17H,9,12-13H2,1-6H3,(H2,21,25)(H,22,26)/t17-/m1/s1; Key:LJKMOYFTWIBFJI-QGZVFWFLSA-N

ADMB-3TMS-PRINACA (ADB-3TMS-PRINACA) is an indazole-3-carboxamide based synthetic cannabinoid receptor agonist that has been sold as a designer drug, first identified in Germany in March 2023. It is the first designer drug ever reported that contains a silicon atom.

== Legality ==
ADMB-3TMS-PRINACA is illegal in Germany and Italy.

== See also ==
- ADB-PINACA
- ADB-FUBINACA
- CUMYL-3TMS-PRINACA
- 1S-LSD
- Silandrone
