= 5F-NNE1 =

Chemical compound

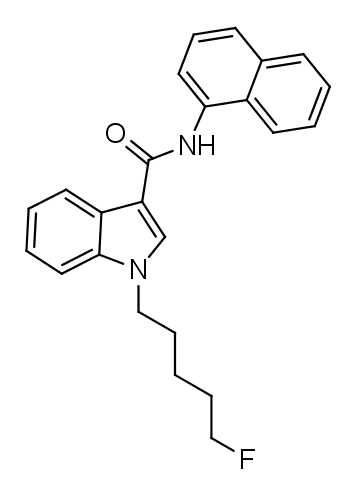

Legal status
- Legal status: CA: Schedule II; DE: NpSG (Industrial and scientific use only); UK: Class B

Identifiers
- IUPAC name: 1-(5-Fluoropentyl)-N-(naphthalen-1-yl)-1H-indole-3-carboxamide
- CAS Number: 1445580-60-8
- PubChem CID: 118796566
- ChemSpider: 29341632
- UNII: 3T22QDP4D9
- CompTox Dashboard (EPA): DTXSID901032710

Chemical and physical data
- Formula: C_{24}H_{23}FN_{2}O
- Molar mass: 374.459 g·mol^{−1}
- 3D model (JSmol): Interactive image
- SMILES: FCCCCCn1cc(c2c1cccc2)C(=O)Nc1cccc2c1cccc2
- InChI: InChI=1S/C24H23FN2O/c25-15-6-1-7-16-27-17-21(20-12-4-5-14-23(20)27)24(28)26-22-13-8-10-18-9-2-3-11-19(18)22/h2-5,8-14,17H,1,6-7,15-16H2,(H,26,28); Key:DJKVOBZLMBHFKX-UHFFFAOYSA-N

5F-NNE1 (also known as 5F-NNEI and 5F-MN-24) is an indole-based synthetic cannabinoid that is presumed to be a potent agonist of the CB_{1} receptor and has been sold online as a designer drug. Given the known metabolic liberation (and presence as an impurity) of amantadine in the related compound APINACA, it is suspected that metabolic hydrolysis of the amide group of 5F-NNE1 may release 1-naphthylamine, a known carcinogen.

== Legality ==
Sweden's public health agency suggested classifying 5F-NNE1 as hazardous substance on November 10, 2014.

== See also ==
- 5F-ADBICA
- 5F-SDB-006
- AM-2201
- FDU-NNE1
- FUB-144
- MMB-2201
- NNE1
- PX-1
