= 1D-LSD =

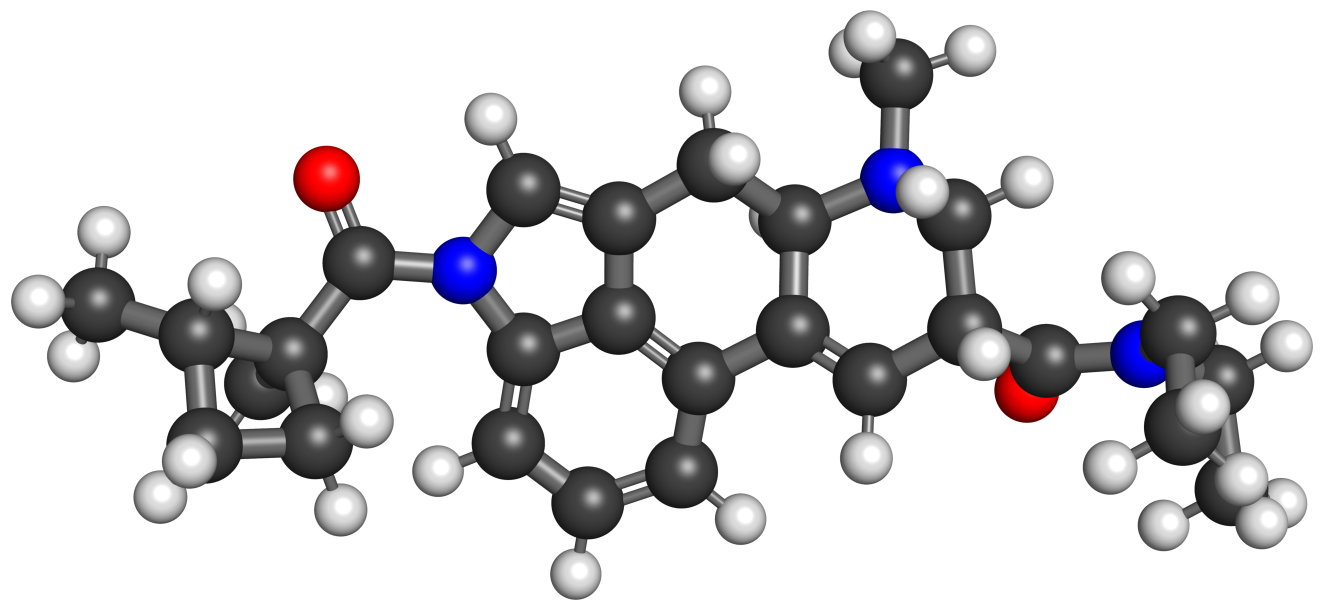

Clinical data
- Other names: 1-(1,2-Dimethylcyclobutane-1-carbonyl)-LSD; 1-(1,2-Dimethylcyclobutane-1-carbonyl)-N,N-diethyllysergamide; SYN-L-229
- Routes of administration: Oral
- Drug class: Serotonergic psychedelic; Hallucinogen
- ATC code: None

Pharmacokinetic data
- Duration of action: 6–8 hours

Identifiers
- IUPAC name: (8β)-1-(1,2-Dimethylcyclobutane-1-carbonyl)-N,N-diethyl-6-methyl-9,10-didehydroergoline-8-carboxamide
- CAS Number: 3028950-67-3
- PubChem CID: 170703347

Chemical and physical data
- Formula: C_{27}H_{35}N_{3}O_{2}
- Molar mass: 433.596 g·mol^{−1}
- 3D model (JSmol): Interactive image
- SMILES: [H][C@@]12CC3=CN(C(=O)C4(C)CCC4C)C4=C3C(=CC=C4)C1=C[C@H](CN2C)C(=O)N(CC)CC
- InChI: InChI=1S/C27H35N3O2/c1-6-29(7-2)25(31)19-13-21-20-9-8-10-22-24(20)18(14-23(21)28(5)15-19)16-30(22)26(32)27(4)12-11-17(27)3/h8-10,13,16-17,19,23H,6-7,11-12,14-15H2,1-5H3/t17?,19-,23-,27?/m1/s1; Key:RNVFVHAKGPSAIU-ZRCBXKLVSA-N

1D-LSD, also known as 1-(1,2-dimethylcyclobutane-1-carbonyl)-LSD or as SYN-L-229, is a psychedelic drug of the lysergamide family related to lysergic acid diethylamide (LSD). It is believed to be a prodrug of LSD and replaced 1V-LSD in Germany after 1V-LSD became covered by the German NpSG law in 2022.

== Use and effects ==
1D-LSD has a dose of 10 to 350 μg depending on the intended use, with blotter tabs typically containing 150 μg. It is said to be roughly comparable in potency to 1V-LSD. 1D-LSD is said to have a much faster onset than 1V-LSD or LSD but to also have a shorter duration in comparison (6–8 hours and 10–12 hours, respectively).

== Chemistry ==
=== Analogues ===
Analogues of 1D-LSD include ALD-52 (1A-LSD), 1P-LSD, 1S-LSD, 1DD-LSD, 1V-LSD, 1cP-LSD, and 1T-LSD, among others.

== History ==
1D-LSD was encountered online as a novel designer drug in October 2022 after 1V-LSD was prohibited in Germany in September 2022.

== Society and culture ==
=== Legal status ===
==== Austria ====
According to the current legal situation, 1D-LSD is neither explicitly mentioned in the Narcotic Drugs Ordinance nor in the Psychotropic Substances Ordinance (SV/PV), thus it is neither to be classified as a narcotic drug in the sense of the SV nor as a psychotropic substance in the sense of the PV.

==== Canada ====
1D-LSD is not a controlled substance in Canada as of 2025.

==== Germany ====
Since the 14 June 2024 1D-LSD (and 1T-LSD) are covered by the German NpSG law.

==== United States ====
1D-LSD is not an explicitly controlled substance in the United States. However, it could be considered a controlled substance under the Federal Analogue Act if intended for human consumption.

== See also ==
- Substituted lysergamide
- Lizard Labs
