= 5F-CUMYL-PEGACLONE =

Chemical compound

Legal status
- Legal status: CA: Schedule II; DE: NpSG (Industrial and scientific use only); UK: Under Psychoactive Substances Act

Identifiers
- IUPAC name: 2,5-Dihydro-2-(1-methyl-1-phenylethyl)-5-(5-fluoropentyl)-1H-pyrido[4,3-b]indol-1-one
- CAS Number: 2377403-49-9
- PubChem CID: 134818048
- ChemSpider: 73962276
- UNII: 7S7IFQ9PPG

Chemical and physical data
- Formula: C_{25}H_{27}FN_{2}O
- Molar mass: 390.502 g·mol^{−1}
- 3D model (JSmol): Interactive image
- SMILES: CC(C)(c1ccccc1)N4C=Cc3n(CCCCCF)c2ccccc2c3C4=O
- InChI: InChI=1S/C25H27FN2O/c1-25(2,19-11-5-3-6-12-19)28-18-15-22-23(24(28)29)20-13-7-8-14-21(20)27(22)17-10-4-9-16-26/h3,5-8,11-15,18H,4,9-10,16-17H2,1-2H3; Key:SMRRORRDOWXERZ-UHFFFAOYSA-N

5F-CUMYL-PEGACLONE (5F-SGT-151, SGT-269) is a gamma-carboline based synthetic cannabinoid that has been sold as a designer drug, first being identified in Germany in 2017. It acts as a potent full agonist of the CB_{1} receptor. It appears to be more toxic than related compounds such as CUMYL-PEGACLONE, and has been linked to numerous serious adverse reactions, some fatal.

== See also ==
- 5F-CUMYL-PINACA
- CUMYL-5F-P7AICA
