= List of HU cannabinoids =

A research group led by Raphael Mechoulam at Hebrew University has synthesized many cannabinoids. Some of those are:

- HU-210 — a high affinity CB_{1} agonist (K_{i} = 0.23 nM)
- HU-211 — the (+)-enantiomer of HU-210 with dramatically reduced CB_{1} affinity
- HU-239 — also known as ajulemic acid
- HU-243
- HU-308
- HU-320
- HU-331
- HU-336
- HU-345

== See also ==
- List of AM cannabinoids
- List of CP cannabinoids
- List of JWH cannabinoids
- List of miscellaneous designer cannabinoids
