= CUMYL-FUBINACA =

Chemical compound

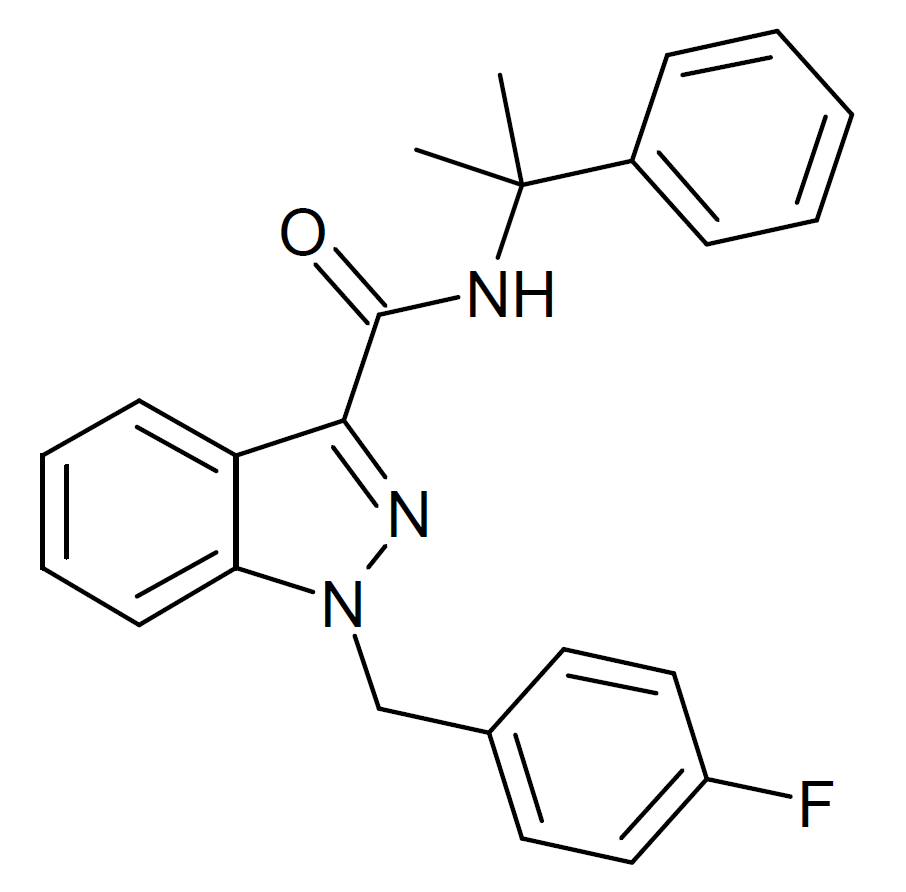

Legal status
- Legal status: DE: NpSG (Industrial and scientific use only); UK: Class B

Identifiers
- IUPAC name: 1-[(4-fluorophenyl)methyl]-N-(2-phenylpropan-2-yl)indazole-3-carboxamide
- CAS Number: 1631074-58-2
- PubChem CID: 117650352
- ChemSpider: 129433696
- UNII: HT9VV2E852
- CompTox Dashboard (EPA): DTXSID201336713

Chemical and physical data
- Formula: C_{24}H_{22}FN_{3}O
- Molar mass: 387.458 g·mol^{−1}
- 3D model (JSmol): Interactive image
- SMILES: CC(C)(C1=CC=CC=C1)NC(=O)C2=NN(C3=CC=CC=C32)CC4=CC=C(C=C4)F
- InChI: InChI=1S/C24H22FN3O/c1-24(2,18-8-4-3-5-9-18)26-23(29)22-20-10-6-7-11-21(20)28(27-22)16-17-12-14-19(25)15-13-17/h3-15H,16H2,1-2H3,(H,26,29); Key:ABBDMPBQHOHMJZ-UHFFFAOYSA-N

CUMYL-FUBINACA (SGT-149) is an indazole-3-carboxamide based synthetic cannabinoid receptor agonist, with an EC_{50} of 1.8nM for human CB_{1} receptors and 23.7nM for human CB_{2} receptors, giving it around 13x selectivity for CB_{1}. It has been sold online as a designer drug.

== See also ==
- AB-FUBINACA
- CUMYL-PINACA
- CUMYL-CBMINACA
- CUMYL-THPINACA
- MDMB-FUBINACA
