= 5F-ADBICA =

Chemical compound

Legal status
- Legal status: CA: Schedule II; DE: NpSG (Industrial and scientific use only); UK: Class B

Identifiers
- IUPAC name: N-[(2S)-1-Amino-3,3-dimethyl-1-oxobutan-2-yl]-1-(5-fluoropentyl)indole-3-carboxamide
- CAS Number: 1801338-27-1
- PubChem CID: 118796421
- ChemSpider: 52085200
- UNII: U9H280G9O7
- CompTox Dashboard (EPA): DTXSID401130575

Chemical and physical data
- Formula: C_{20}H_{28}FN_{3}O_{2}
- Molar mass: 361.461 g·mol^{−1}
- 3D model (JSmol): Interactive image
- SMILES: CC(C)(C)[C@@H](C(=O)N)NC(=O)C1=CN(C2=CC=CC=C21)CCCCCF
- InChI: InChI=1S/C20H28FN3O2/c1-20(2,3)17(18(22)25)23-19(26)15-13-24(12-8-4-7-11-21)16-10-6-5-9-14(15)16/h5-6,9-10,13,17H,4,7-8,11-12H2,1-3H3,(H2,22,25)(H,23,26)/t17-/m1/s1; Key:ITZSOCZDFSHNCL-QGZVFWFLSA-N

5F-ADBICA (also known as 5F-ADB-PICA) is an indole-based synthetic cannabinoid that is a potent agonist at CB_{1} receptors and CB_{2} receptors with EC_{50} values of 0.77 nM and 1.2 nM respectively.

== Legal status ==
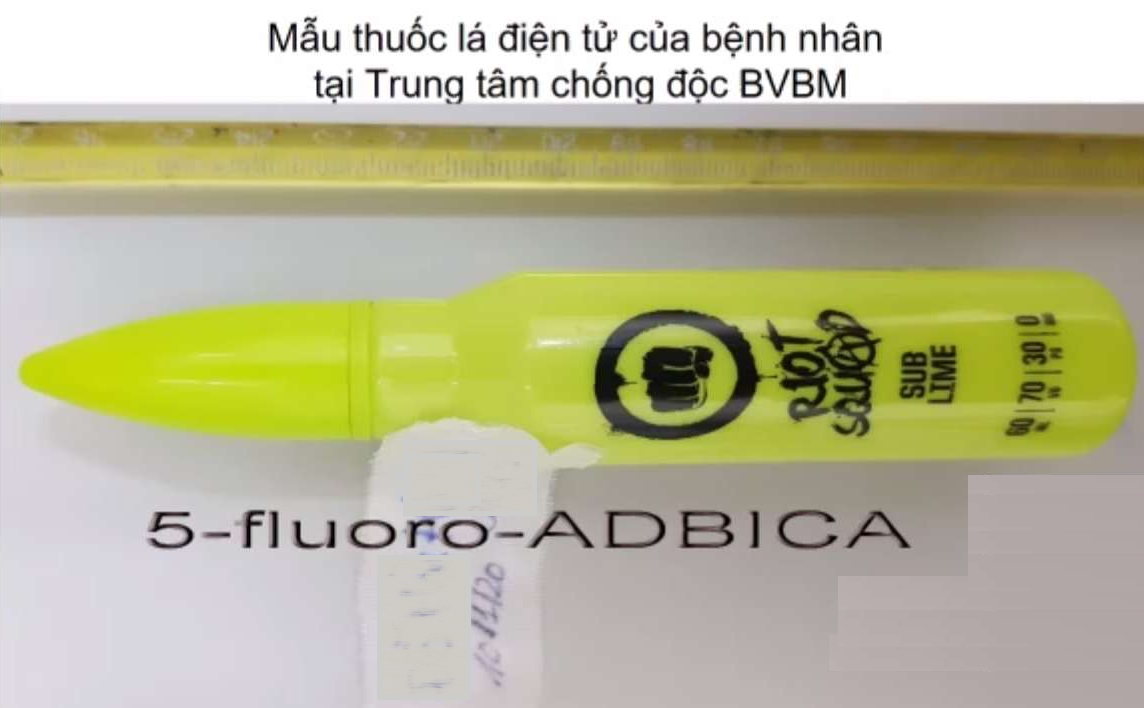
E-cigarette sample containing 5F-ADBICA from a patient at the Poison Control Center of Bach Mai Hospital

=== China ===
As of October 2015 5F-ADBICA is a controlled substance in China.

== See also ==
- ADBICA
- ADB-PINACA
- APICA
- PX-1
- SDB-001
- STS-135
