= 1BP-LSD =

Clinical data
- Other names: 1-(3-(Tetramethyldioxa-borolane)propionyl)-LSD
- Routes of administration: Oral
- Drug class: Serotonergic psychedelic; Hallucinogen
- ATC code: None

Identifiers
- IUPAC name: (6aR,9R)-N,N-diethyl-7-methyl-4-(4-(4,4,5,5-tetraethyl-1,3,2-dioxaborolan-2-yl)benzoyl)-4,6,6a,7,8,9-hexahydroindolo[4,3-fg]quinoline-9-carboxamide

Chemical and physical data
- Formula: C_{37}H_{48}BN_{3}O_{4}
- Molar mass: 609.62 g·mol^{−1}
- 3D model (JSmol): Interactive image
- SMILES: CCN(C([C@H](C=C1[C@@]2([H])CC3=CN(C(CCB4OC(C)(C)C(C)(C)O4)=O)C5=CC=CC1=C35)CN2C)=O)CC
- InChI: InChI=1S/C29H40BN3O4/c1-8-32(9-2)27(35)20-15-22-21-11-10-12-23-26(21)19(16-24(22)31(7)17-20)18-33(23)25(34)13-14-30-36-28(3,4)29(5,6)37-30/h10-12,15,18,20,24H,8-9,13-14,16-17H2,1-7H3/t20-,24-/m1/s1; Key:WTJNMHVFTSXKOI-HYBUGGRVSA-N

1BP-LSD, also known as 1-(3-(tetramethyldioxaborolane)propionyl)-LSD, is a psychedelic drug of the lysergamide family related to lysergic acid diethylamide (LSD). It is thought to be a prodrug of LSD. The drug was encountered online as a novel designer drug in December 2025. 1BP-LSD has been sold in the form of blotter containing 175 and 200 μg per tab. It has been said to be considered to be the official legal successor of 1S-LSD, which was banned in Germany soon before 1BP-LSD's appearance. The effects of 1BP-LSD are said to be similar to those of 1S-LSD and to include visual changes, altered perception of time and space, heightened emotions, and increased creativity. 1BP-LSD is not an explicitly controlled substance in the United States or in Canada.

== See also ==
- Substituted lysergamide
