= SDB-006 =

Chemical compound

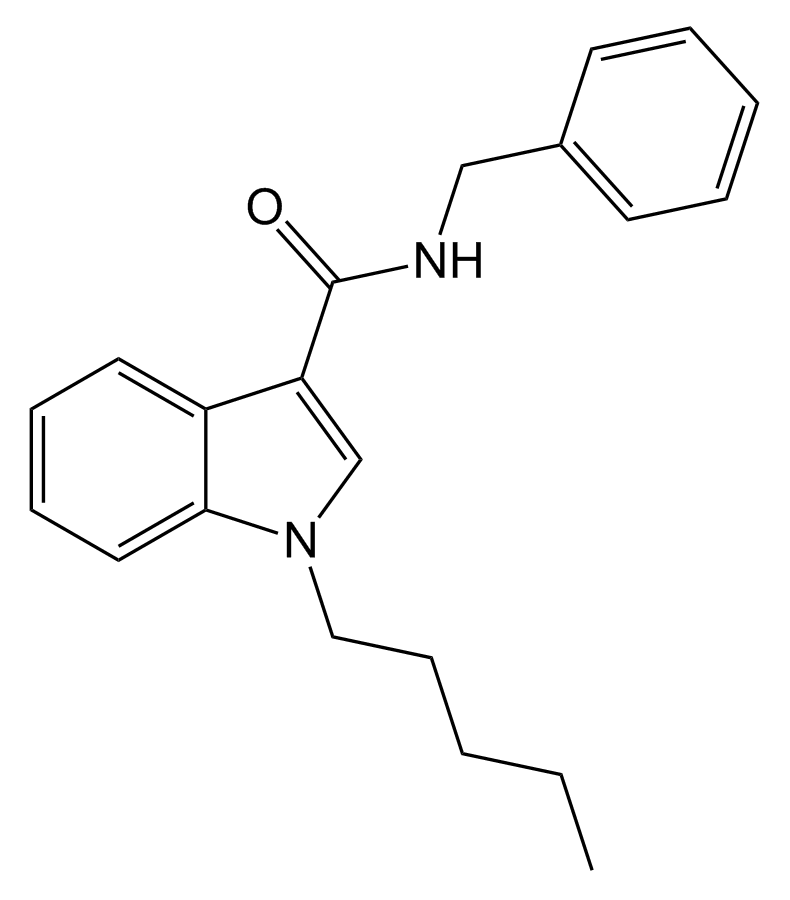

Legal status
- Legal status: CA: Schedule II; DE: Anlage II (Authorized trade only, not prescriptible); UK: Class B

Identifiers
- IUPAC name: N-benzyl-1-pentyl-1H-indole-3-carboxamide
- CAS Number: 695213-59-3
- PubChem CID: 2227769
- ChemSpider: 1665835
- UNII: MM02A5A302
- CompTox Dashboard (EPA): DTXSID501009997

Chemical and physical data
- Formula: C_{21}H_{24}N_{2}O
- Molar mass: 320.436 g·mol^{−1}
- 3D model (JSmol): Interactive image
- SMILES: O=C(NCC1=CC=CC=C1)C2=CN(CCCCC)C3=CC=CC=C32

SDB-006 is a drug that acts as a potent agonist for the cannabinoid receptors, with an EC_{50} of 19 nM for human CB_{2} receptors, and 134 nM for human CB_{1} receptors. It was discovered during research into the related compound SDB-001 which had been sold illicitly as "2NE1". SDB-006 metabolism has been described in literature.

== See also ==
- 5F-CUMYL-PINACA
- 5F-SDB-006
- APINACA
- CUMYL-PICA
- CUMYL-PINACA
- CUMYL-THPINACA
- SDB-001
- SDB-005
- STS-135
