= Lenabasum =

Chemical compound

Clinical data
- Trade names: Lenabasum
- Routes of administration: Oral
- ATC code: None

Legal status
- Legal status: Investigational

Pharmacokinetic data
- Metabolism: Minimal

Identifiers
- IUPAC name: (6aR,10aR)-3-(1,1-Dimethylheptyl)-6a,7,10,10a-tetrahydro-1-hydroxy-6,6-dimethyl-6H-dibenzo[b,d]pyran-9-carboxylic acid
- CAS Number: 137945-48-3
- PubChem CID: 3083542
- ChemSpider: 21106251
- UNII: OGN7X90BT8
- ChEMBL: ChEMBL456341
- CompTox Dashboard (EPA): DTXSID40900959

Chemical and physical data
- Formula: C_{25}H_{36}O_{4}
- Molar mass: 400.559 g·mol^{−1}
- 3D model (JSmol): Interactive image
- SMILES: OC(C1=CC[C@](C(C)(C)OC2=C3C(O)=CC(C(C)(C)CCCCCC)=C2)([H])[C@@]3([H])C1)=O
- InChI: InChI=1S/C25H36O4/c1-6-7-8-9-12-24(2,3)17-14-20(26)22-18-13-16(23(27)28)10-11-19(18)25(4,5)29-21(22)15-17/h10-11,14-16,18-19,26H,6-9,12-13H2,1-5H3,(H,27,28)/t16?,18-,19-/m1/s1; Key:QHGPTMABBHVVQU-VOBHOPKGSA-N

Lenabasum (also known as ajulemic acid, 1',1'-dimethylheptyl-delta-8-tetrahydrocannabinol-11-oic acid, DMH-D8-THC-11-OIC, AB-III-56, HU-239, IP-751, CPL 7075, CT-3, JBT-101, Anabasum, and Resunab) is a synthetic cannabinoid that shows anti-fibrotic and anti-inflammatory effects in pre-clinical studies without causing a subjective "high". Although its design was inspired by a metabolite of delta-9-THC known as delta-9-THC-11-oic acid, lenabasum is an analog of the delta-8-THC metabolite delta-8-THC-11-oic acid. It is being developed for the treatment of inflammatory and fibrotic conditions such as systemic sclerosis, dermatomyositis and cystic fibrosis. It does not share the anti-emetic effects of some other cannabinoids, but may be useful for treating chronic inflammatory conditions where inflammation fails to resolve. Side effects include dry mouth, tiredness, and dizziness. The mechanism of action is through activation of the CB_{2} receptor leading to production of specialized proresolving eicosanoids such as lipoxin A4 and prostaglandin J2. Studies in animals at doses up to 40 mg/kg show minimal psychoactivity of lenabasum, compared to that produced by tetrahydrocannabinol. Lenabasum is being developed by Corbus Pharmaceuticals (formerly JB Therapeutics) for the treatment of orphan chronic life-threatening inflammatory diseases. Development since been discontinued.
