= CUMYL-BC-HPMEGACLONE-221 =

Chemical compound

Cumyl-BC-HpMeGaClone-221
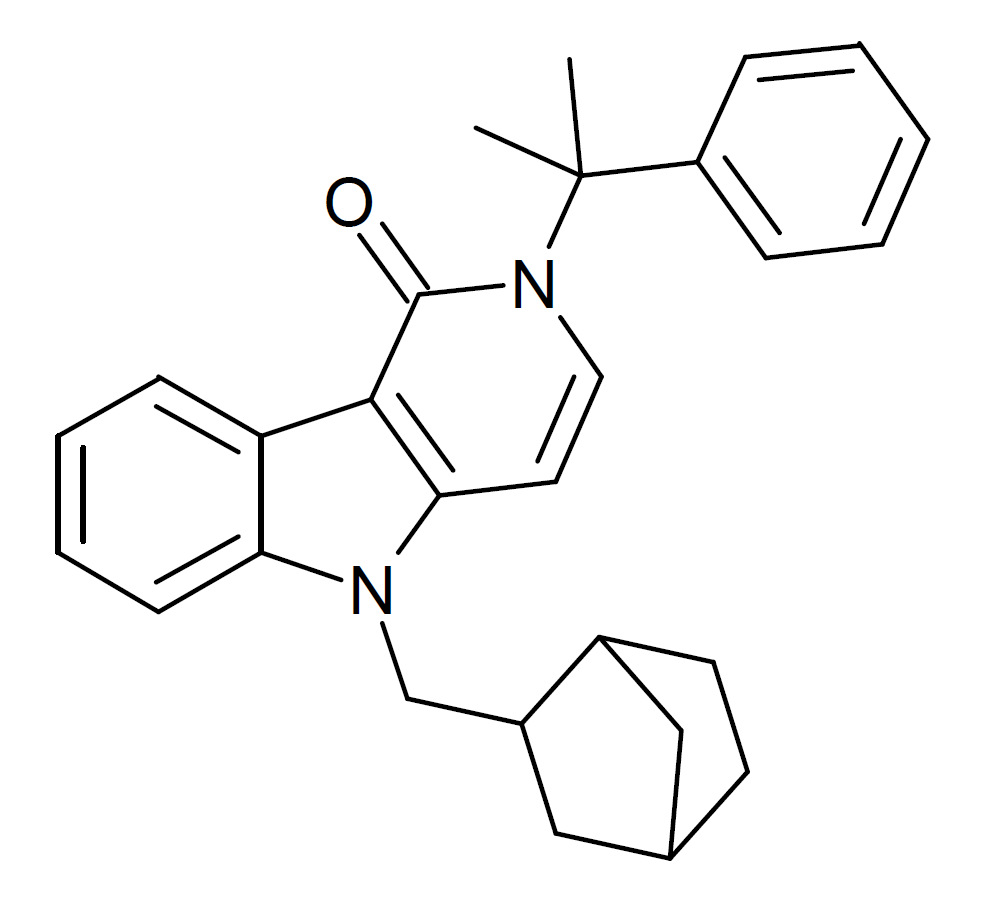

Legal status
- Legal status: CA: Schedule II; DE: NpSG (Industrial and scientific use only); UK: Under Psychoactive Substances Act

Identifiers
- IUPAC name: 5-({Bicyclo[2.2.1]heptan-2-yl}methyl)-2-(2-phenylpropan-2-yl)-1H,2H,5H-pyrido[4,3-b]indol-1-one
- PubChem CID: 163190698
- ChemSpider: 115285286
- CompTox Dashboard (EPA): DTXSID501336924

Chemical and physical data
- Formula: C_{28}H_{30}N_{2}O
- Molar mass: 410.561 g·mol^{−1}
- 3D model (JSmol): Interactive image
- SMILES: CC(C)(c1ccccc1)N1C=Cc2n(CC3CC4CCC3C4)c3ccccc3c2C1=O
- InChI: InChI=1S/C28H30N2O/c1-28(2,22-8-4-3-5-9-22)30-15-14-25-26(27(30)31)23-10-6-7-11-24(23)29(25)18-21-17-19-12-13-20(21)16-19/h3-11,14-15,19-21H,12-13,16-18H2,1-2H3; Key:VFBNNQOHBYEVLU-UHFFFAOYSA-N

Cumyl-BC-HpMeGaClone-221 (Cumyl-NBMeGaClone, Cumyl-BC[2.2.1]HpMeGaClone, SGT-271) is a gamma-carboline derivative which is a synthetic cannabinoid that has been sold as a designer drug. It was first identified in Germany in September 2020.

== See also ==
- CUMYL-CB-MEGACLONE
- CUMYL-CH-MEGACLONE
- CUMYL-PEGACLONE
- CUMYL-NBMINACA
