= CUMYL-CBMICA =

Chemical compound

Legal status
- Legal status: DE: NpSG (Industrial and scientific use only); UK: Class B

Identifiers
- IUPAC name: 1-(cyclobutylmethyl)-N-(2-phenylpropan-2-yl)indole-3-carboxamide
- CAS Number: 2571070-88-5
- PubChem CID: 155884426
- ChemSpider: 84400460
- UNII: GPD3YVJ5RT
- CompTox Dashboard (EPA): DTXSID001336648

Chemical and physical data
- Formula: C_{23}H_{26}N_{2}O
- Molar mass: 346.474 g·mol^{−1}
- 3D model (JSmol): Interactive image
- SMILES: CC(C)(NC(=O)c3cn(CC1CCC1)c2ccccc23)c4ccccc4
- InChI: InChI=1S/C23H26N2O/c1-23(2,18-11-4-3-5-12-18)24-22(26)20-16-25(15-17-9-8-10-17)21-14-7-6-13-19(20)21/h3-7,11-14,16-17H,8-10,15H2,1-2H3,(H,24,26); Key:INXXQNIOWMOYEJ-UHFFFAOYSA-N

CUMYL-CBMICA (SGT-280) is an indole-3-carboxamide based synthetic cannabinoid receptor agonist which has been sold as a designer drug, first being identified in Germany in August 2019. Since the structure fell outside the German drug analogue law provisions at the time, an amendment was made to the law to expand the relevant definition, which came into effect in April 2020. It has been shown to act as a CB_{1} receptor agonist with an EC_{50} of 62.9nM.

== See also ==
- CUMYL-CBMINACA
- CUMYL-THPINACA
