= List of CP cannabinoids =

Many synthetic cannabinoids were designed by Pfizer in the 1970s and 1980s, and feature an alphanumeric code beginning with the prefix "CP" (after Charles Pfizer). Recently, several members of this class of cannabinoids have been discovered in recreational drug products.

- CP 47,497 —
- (C6)-CP 47,497 —
- (C7)-CP 47,497 (CP 47,497 itself) —
- (C8)-CP 47,497 (Cannabicyclohexanol) —
- (C9)-CP 47,497 —
- CP 50,556-1 (Levonantradol) —
- CP 55,244 —
- CP 55,940 —
- (±)-CP 55,940 — (±)-CP 55,940 is a widely used cannabinoid research tool.
- (+)-CP 55,940 —
- (-)-CP 55,940 —
- CP-945,598 (Otenabant) —

== See also ==
- List of AM cannabinoids
- List of HU cannabinoids
- List of JWH cannabinoids
- List of miscellaneous designer cannabinoids
