= FDU-NNE1 =

Chemical compound

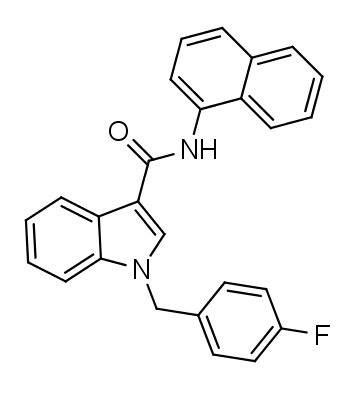

Legal status
- Legal status: CA: Schedule II; DE: NpSG (Industrial and scientific use only); UK: Class B

Identifiers
- IUPAC name: [1-(4-fluorobenzyl)-N-(naphthalen-1-yl)-1H-indole-3-carboxamide
- CAS Number: 2365471-76-5
- PubChem CID: 122213806
- ChemSpider: 58794744
- UNII: M5H92FEG4W

Chemical and physical data
- Formula: C_{26}H_{19}FN_{2}O
- Molar mass: 394.449 g·mol^{−1}
- 3D model (JSmol): Interactive image
- SMILES: O=C(C1=CN(CC2=CC=C(F)C=C2)C3=C1C=CC=C3)NC4=C(C=CC=C5)C5=CC=C4
- InChI: InChI=1S/C26H19FN2O/c27-20-14-12-18(13-15-20)16-29-17-23(22-9-3-4-11-25(22)29)26(30)28-24-10-5-7-19-6-1-2-8-21(19)24/h1-15,17H,16H2,(H,28,30); Key:XYSIFMHZXZATQO-UHFFFAOYSA-N

FDU-NNE1 (also known as FDU-NNEI and FDU-MN-24) is an indole-based synthetic cannabinoid that is presumed to be a potent agonist of the CB_{1} receptor and has been sold online as a designer drug. Given the known metabolic liberation (and presence as an impurity) of amantadine in the related compound APINACA, it is suspected that metabolic hydrolysis of the amide group of FDU-NNE1 will release 1-naphthylamine, a known carcinogen.

== See also ==
- 5F-NNE1
- 5F-PB-22
- BB-22
- FUB-144
- FUB-PB-22
- MDMB-FUBICA
- NNE1
