= CUMYL-NBMINACA =

Chemical compound

Identifiers
- IUPAC name: [1-(bicyclo[2.2.1]heptan-2-yl)methyl]-N-(2-phenylpropan-2-yl)-1H-indazole-3-carboxamide
- CAS Number: 1631074-60-6
- PubChem CID: 117650372
- ChemSpider: 115005719
- CompTox Dashboard (EPA): DTXSID401342013

Chemical and physical data
- Formula: C_{25}H_{29}N_{3}O
- Molar mass: 387.527 g·mol^{−1}
- 3D model (JSmol): Interactive image
- SMILES: CC(C)(C1=CC=CC=C1)NC(=O)C2=NN(C3=CC=CC=C32)CC4CC5CCC4C5
- InChI: InChI=1S/C25H29N3O/c1-25(2,20-8-4-3-5-9-20)26-24(29)23-21-10-6-7-11-22(21)28(27-23)16-19-15-17-12-13-18(19)14-17/h3-11,17-19H,12-16H2,1-2H3,(H,26,29); Key:MLRLLZWQYJJPEX-UHFFFAOYSA-N

CUMYL-NBMINACA (SGT-152, Cumyl-BC[2.2.1]HpMINACA) is a synthetic cannabinoid compound first reported in a 2013 patent, but not identified as a designer drug until 2021, being identified by a forensic laboratory in Germany in February 2021.

== See also ==
- CUMYL-BC-HPMEGACLONE-221
- CUMYL-3TMS-PRINACA
