= A-CHMINACA =

Synthetic cannabinoid

Legal status
- Legal status: DE: NpSG (Industrial and scientific use only) (Note: NpSG blanket ban)

Identifiers
- IUPAC name: N-(1-adamantyl)-1-(cyclohexylmethyl)indazole-3-carboxamide
- CAS Number: 1400742-33-7
- PubChem CID: 137700313
- ChemSpider: 95533406
- UNII: ZWS947EX7P

Chemical and physical data
- Formula: C_{25}H_{33}N_{3}O
- Molar mass: 391.559 g·mol^{−1}
- 3D model (JSmol): Interactive image
- SMILES: C1CCC(CC1)CN2C3=CC=CC=C3C(=N2)C(=O)NC45CC6CC(C4)CC(C6)C5
- InChI: InChI=1S/C25H33N3O/c29-24(26-25-13-18-10-19(14-25)12-20(11-18)15-25)23-21-8-4-5-9-22(21)28(27-23)16-17-6-2-1-3-7-17/h4-5,8-9,17-20H,1-3,6-7,10-16H2,(H,26,29); Key:ACFKPINHOINOFB-UHFFFAOYSA-N

A-CHMINACA, (ACHMINACA, Adamantyl-CHMINACA, SGT-37), is an indazole-based synthetic cannabinoid that binds to the CB_{1} and CB_{2} receptors.

It has an EC_{50} of 159 nM for human CB_{1} receptors.

== Metabolism ==
A-CHMINACA is not hydrolized by human carboxylesterases which increases its half-life.

== Distribution ==
A-CHMINACA has been sold as a designer drug with one sample having been seized by Polish authorities in Lublin.

It was also detected in samples taken in Toronto in 2020.

== See also ==
- 5F-AB-PINACA
- 5F-ADB
- 5F-AMB
- AB-FUBINACA
- AB-CHFUPYCA
- AB-PINACA
- ADB-CHMINACA
- ADB-FUBINACA
- ADB-PINACA
- ADBICA
- APICA
- APINACA
- MDMB-CHMICA
- MDMB-CHMINACA
- MDMB-FUBINACA
- PX-3
