= CUMYL-PICA =

Chemical compound

Legal status
- Legal status: CA: Schedule II; DE: NpSG (Industrial and scientific use only); UK: Class B

Identifiers
- IUPAC name: 1-pentyl-N-(2-phenylpropan-2-yl)-1H-indole-3-carboxamide
- CAS Number: 1400742-32-6
- PubChem CID: 86273678
- ChemSpider: 34450887
- UNII: H4APZ90T9U
- CompTox Dashboard (EPA): DTXSID601017202

Chemical and physical data
- Formula: C_{23}H_{28}N_{2}O
- Molar mass: 348.490 g·mol^{−1}
- 3D model (JSmol): Interactive image
- SMILES: O=C(NC(C)(C)C1=CC=CC=C1)C2=CN(CCCCC)C3=C2C=CC=C3
- InChI: InChI=1S/C23H28N2O/c1-4-5-11-16-25-17-20(19-14-9-10-15-21(19)25)22(26)24-23(2,3)18-12-7-6-8-13-18/h6-10,12-15,17H,4-5,11,16H2,1-3H3,(H,24,26); Key:RCXFMWJQOYCIQU-UHFFFAOYSA-N

CUMYL-PICA (SGT-56) is an indole-3-carboxamide based synthetic cannabinoid. It is the α,α-dimethylbenzyl analogue of SDB-006. It was briefly sold in New Zealand during 2013 as an ingredient of at the time legal synthetic cannabis products, but the product containing CUMYL-BICA and CUMYL-PICA was denied an interim licensing approval under the Psychoactive Substances regulatory scheme, due to reports of adverse events in consumers. CUMYL-PICA acts as an agonist for the cannabinoid receptors, with K_{i} values of 59.21 nM at CB_{1} and 136.38 nM at CB_{2} and EC_{50} values of 11.98 nM at CB_{1} and 16.2 nM at CB_{2}.

== See also ==
- 5F-CUMYL-PINACA
- 5F-SDB-006
- CUMYL-4CN-BINACA
- CUMYL-PINACA
- CUMYL-THPINACA
- SDB-006
- NNE1
