= CUMYL-CBMINACA =

Chemical compound

Legal status
- Legal status: DE: NpSG (Industrial and scientific use only); UK: Class B

Identifiers
- IUPAC name: 1-(cyclobutylmethyl)-N-(2-phenylpropan-2-yl)indazole-3-carboxamide
- CAS Number: 3001262-62-7
- PubChem CID: 155884799
- ChemSpider: 90606548
- UNII: 3DAF3CP9N5
- CompTox Dashboard (EPA): DTXSID101336534

Chemical and physical data
- Formula: C_{22}H_{25}N_{3}O
- Molar mass: 347.462 g·mol^{−1}
- 3D model (JSmol): Interactive image
- SMILES: CC(C)(NC(=O)c3nn(CC1CCC1)c2ccccc23)c4ccccc4
- InChI: InChI=1S/C22H25N3O/c1-22(2,17-11-4-3-5-12-17)23-21(26)20-18-13-6-7-14-19(18)25(24-20)15-16-9-8-10-16/h3-7,11-14,16H,8-10,15H2,1-2H3,(H,23,26); Key:CFMZQSDQCNKGII-UHFFFAOYSA-N

CUMYL-CBMINACA (SGT-277) is an indazole-3-carboxamide based synthetic cannabinoid receptor agonist that has been sold as a designer drug, first being identified in Germany in February 2020. It is illegal in Finland.

== See also ==
- CUMYL-3TMS-PRINACA
- CUMYL-CBMICA
- CUMYL-CH-MEGACLONE
- CUMYL-CHMICA
- CUMYL-THPINACA
