= 5F-SDB-006 =

Chemical compound

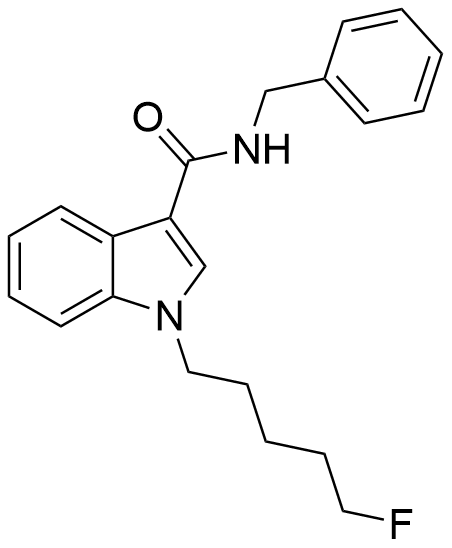

Legal status
- Legal status: CA: Schedule II; DE: Anlage II (Authorized trade only, not prescriptible); UK: Class B

Identifiers
- IUPAC name: N-benzyl-1-(5-fluoropentyl)-1H-indole-3-carboxamide
- CAS Number: 1776086-02-2
- PubChem CID: 91936847
- ChemSpider: 30646773
- UNII: 4UP4SXX8BW
- CompTox Dashboard (EPA): DTXSID601032523

Chemical and physical data
- Formula: C_{21}H_{23}FN_{2}O
- Molar mass: 338.426 g·mol^{−1}
- 3D model (JSmol): Interactive image
- SMILES: FCCCCCN1C=C(C(NCC2=CC=CC=C2)=O)C3=C1C=CC=C3
- InChI: InChI=1S/C21H23FN2O/c22-13-7-2-8-14-24-16-19(18-11-5-6-12-20(18)24)21(25)23-15-17-9-3-1-4-10-17/h1,3-6,9-12,16H,2,7-8,13-15H2,(H,23,25); Key:VFLXAWVAWXHMFB-UHFFFAOYSA-N

5F-SDB-006 is a drug that acts as a potent agonist for the cannabinoid receptors, with an EC_{50} of 50 nM for human CB_{1} receptors, and 123 nM for human CB_{2} receptors. It was discovered during research into the related compound APICA which had been sold illicitly as "2NE1". 5F-SDB-006 is the terminally fluorinated analog of SDB-006, just as STS-135 is the terminally fluorinated analog of APICA. Given the known metabolic liberation (and presence as an impurity) of amantadine in the related compound APINACA, it is suspected that metabolic hydrolysis of the amide group of 5F-SDB-006 may release benzylamine.

== See also ==
- APICA
- APINACA
- CUMYL-PICA
- CUMYL-PINACA
- CUMYL-THPINACA
- 5F-CUMYL-PINACA
- SDB-006
- STS-135
- XLR-11
