= Adamantyl-THPINACA =

Chemical compound

Legal status
- Legal status: CA: Schedule II; DE: NpSG (Industrial and scientific use only); UK: Class B

Identifiers
- IUPAC name: N-(2-Adamantyl)-1-(tetrahydropyran-4-ylmethyl)indazole-3-carboxamide
- CAS Number: 2365471-86-7 1400742-48-4 (1-adamantyl isomer)
- PubChem CID: 123132009
- ChemSpider: 58858889
- UNII: 7I4LAF1R3Y
- CompTox Dashboard (EPA): DTXSID101009995

Chemical and physical data
- Formula: C_{24}H_{31}N_{3}O_{2}
- Molar mass: 393.531 g·mol^{−1}
- 3D model (JSmol): Interactive image
- SMILES: C12C(C3CC(CC(C1)C3)C2)NC(=O)C2=NN(C3=CC=CC=C23)CC2CCOCC2
- InChI: InChI=1/C24H31N3O2/c28-24(25-22-18-10-16-9-17(12-18)13-19(22)11-16)23-20-3-1-2-4-21(20)27(26-23)14-15-5-7-29-8-6-15/h1-4,15-19,22H,5-14H2,(H,25,28)/f/h25H; Key:XFZLBNDGZVRJNJ-UHFFFAOYSA-N

Adamantyl-THPINACA (ATHPINACA, AD-THPINACA) is an indazole-based synthetic cannabinoid, which was first reported to Europol in Slovenia in January 2015. It is known as both the 1-adamantyl and 2-adamantyl isomers (SGT-40 and SGT-194 respectively), which can be distinguished by GC-EI-MS. It is banned in Sweden and Russia. Both the 1-adamantyl and 2-adamantyl isomers are specifically listed as illegal drugs in Japan. Given the known metabolic liberation (and presence as an impurity) of amantadine in the related compound APINACA, it is suspected that metabolic hydrolysis of the amide group of Adamantyl-THPINACA may also release amantadine.

== See also ==
- 5F-ADB
- 5F-AMB
- 5F-APICA
- AB-CHMINACA
- Adamantyl-CHMINACA
- AB-FUBINACA
- AB-CHFUPYCA
- AB-PINACA
- ADB-CHMINACA
- ADB-FUBINACA
- ADB-PINACA
- APICA
- APINACA
- APP-FUBINACA
- CUMYL-THPINACA
- MDMB-CHMINACA
- MDMB-FUBINACA
- PX-3
