= Silandrone =

Chemical compound

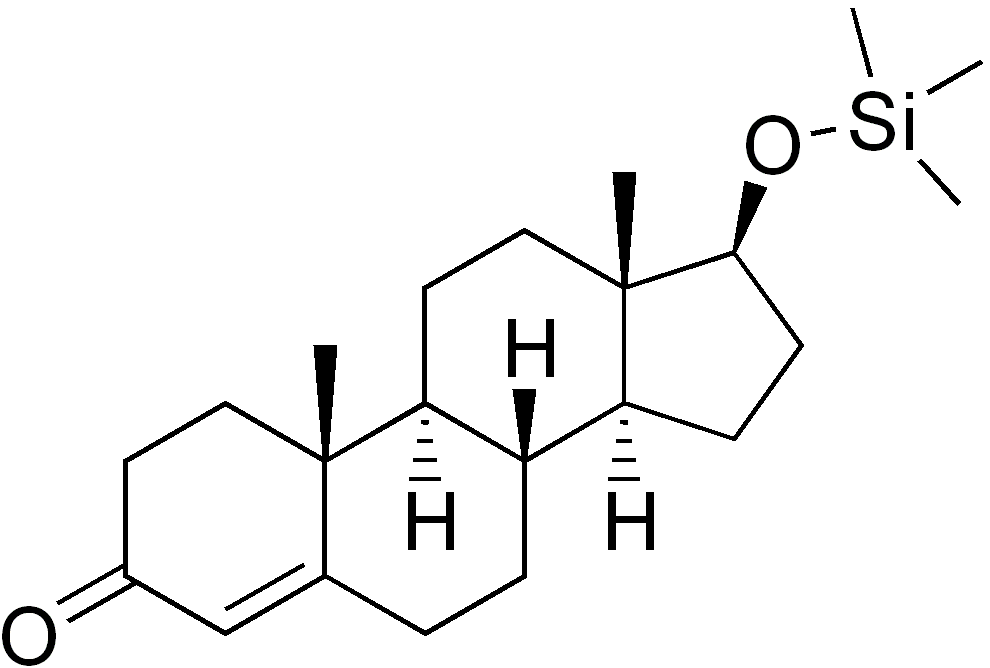

Clinical data
- Other names: Testosterone 17β-trimethylsilyl ether; Testosterone O-trimethylsilyl ether; 17β-Trimethylsilyltestosterone; O-Trimethylsilyltestosterone; 17β-(trimethylsiloxy)androst-4-en-3-one; SC-16148; NSC-95147
- Routes of administration: By mouth, intramuscular injection, subcutaneous injection

Identifiers
- IUPAC name: (8R,9S,10R,13S,14S,17S)-10,13-dimethyl-17-trimethylsilyloxy-1,2,6,7,8,9,11,12,14,15,16,17-dodecahydrocyclopenta[a]phenanthren-3-one
- CAS Number: 5055-42-5
- PubChem CID: 68627
- ChemSpider: 61886
- UNII: YY7GL3CCE9
- KEGG: D05837
- ChEBI: CHEBI:607921
- ChEMBL: ChEMBL485687
- CompTox Dashboard (EPA): DTXSID60884126
- ECHA InfoCard: 100.023.414

Chemical and physical data
- Formula: C_{22}H_{36}O_{2}Si
- Molar mass: 360.613 g·mol^{−1}
- 3D model (JSmol): Interactive image
- SMILES: C[C@]12CC[C@H]3[C@H]([C@@H]1CC[C@@H]2O[Si](C)(C)C)CCC4=CC(=O)CC[C@]34C
- InChI: InChI=1S/C22H36O2Si/c1-21-12-10-16(23)14-15(21)6-7-17-18-8-9-20(24-25(3,4)5)22(18,2)13-11-19(17)21/h14,17-20H,6-13H2,1-5H3/t17-,18-,19-,20-,21-,22-/m0/s1; Key:HNZDTAXZHUDITM-WLNPFYQQSA-N

Silandrone (INN, USAN) (developmental code name SC-16148), also known as testosterone 17β-trimethylsilyl ether or 17β-trimethylsilyltestosterone, as well as 17β-(trimethylsiloxy)androst-4-en-3-one, is a synthetic anabolic-androgenic steroid (AAS) and an androgen ether – specifically, the 17β-trimethylsilyl ether of testosterone – which was developed by the G. D. Searle & Company in the 1960s but was never marketed. It has a very long duration of action when given via subcutaneous or intramuscular injection, as well as significantly greater potency than that of testosterone propionate. In addition, silandrone, unlike testosterone and most esters of testosterone like testosterone propionate, is orally active.

== See also ==
- List of androgen esters
