= CUMYL-PINACA =

Chemical compound

Legal status
- Legal status: CA: Schedule II; DE: NpSG (Industrial and scientific use only); UK: Class B

Identifiers
- IUPAC name: 1-pentyl-N-(2-phenylpropan-2-yl)-1H-indazole-3-carboxamide
- CAS Number: 1400742-15-5
- PubChem CID: 86273676
- ChemSpider: 48060412
- UNII: 3N1P3KD3CV
- CompTox Dashboard (EPA): DTXSID001019036

Chemical and physical data
- Formula: C_{22}H_{27}N_{3}O
- Molar mass: 349.478 g·mol^{−1}
- 3D model (JSmol): Interactive image
- SMILES: CCCCCN1N=C(C(=O)NC(C)(C)C2=CC=CC=C2)C2=CC=CC=C12
- InChI: InChI=1S/C22H27N3O/c1-4-5-11-16-25-19-15-10-9-14-18(19)20(24-25)21(26)23-22(2,3)17-12-7-6-8-13-17/h6-10,12-15H,4-5,11,16H2,1-3H3,(H,23,26); Key:LCBASRYREGWIJT-UHFFFAOYSA-N

CUMYL-PINACA (also known as SGT-24) is an indazole-3-carboxamide based synthetic cannabinoid. CUMYL-PINACA acts as a potent agonist for the cannabinoid receptors, with approximately 3x selectivity for CB_{1}, having an EC_{50} of 0.15nM for human CB_{1} receptors and 0.41nM for human CB_{2} receptors. In its pure form, it is described as a sticky oil which can cause poisoning through transdermal exposure. It has been detected as an extract of organic material by CanTEST in June 2026.

== Legal status ==
Sweden's public health agency suggested classifying CUMYL-PINACA as a hazardous substance, on November 10, 2014.

== See also ==
- 5F-CUMYL-PINACA
- 5F-SDB-006
- CUMYL-3TMS-PRINACA
- CUMYL-4CN-BINACA
- CUMYL-PICA
- CUMYL-THPINACA
- SDB-006
- MN-18
- NNE1
