= 5F-CUMYL-P7AICA =

Chemical compound

Legal status
- Legal status: CA: Schedule II; DE: NpSG (Industrial and scientific use only); UK: Under Psychoactive Substances Act; US: Schedule I

Identifiers
- IUPAC name: 1-(5-Fluoropentyl)-N-(2-phenylpropan-2-yl)pyrrolo[2,3-b]pyridine-3-carboxamide
- CAS Number: 2171492-36-5
- PubChem CID: 129532613
- ChemSpider: 68028038
- UNII: V3J3TQ3UPP

Chemical and physical data
- Formula: C_{22}H_{26}FN_{3}O
- Molar mass: 367.468 g·mol^{−1}
- 3D model (JSmol): Interactive image
- SMILES: FCCCCCn1cc(c3cccnc13)C(=O)NC(C)(C)c2ccccc2
- InChI: InChI=1S/C22H26FN3O/c1-22(2,17-10-5-3-6-11-17)25-21(27)19-16-26(15-8-4-7-13-23)20-18(19)12-9-14-24-20/h3,5-6,9-12,14,16H,4,7-8,13,15H2,1-2H3,(H,25,27); Key:MXJYOUMYJGNQEY-UHFFFAOYSA-N

5F-CUMYL-P7AICA (also known as CUMYL-5F-P7AICA or SGT-263) is a pyrrolo[2,3-b]pyridine-3-carboxamide based synthetic cannabinoid that has been sold as a designer drug. It was first identified by the EMCDDA in February 2015.

== See also ==
- 5F-A-P7AICA
- 5F-AB-P7AICA
- 5F-CUMYL-PINACA
- 5F-MDMB-P7AICA
- 5F-PCN
- 5F-SDB-006
- ADB-P7AICA
