= NNE1 =

Chemical compound

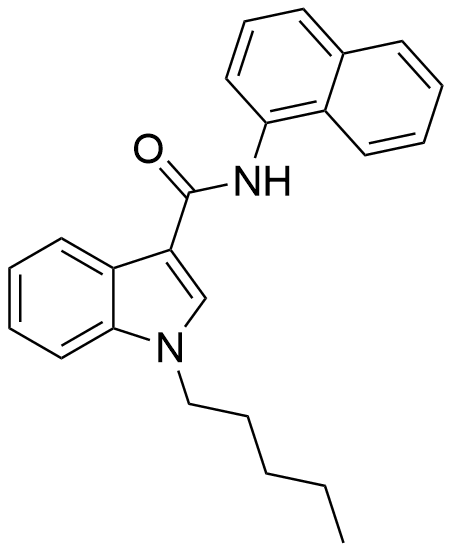

Legal status
- Legal status: CA: Schedule II; DE: NpSG (Industrial and scientific use only); UK: Class B

Identifiers
- IUPAC name: N-1-naphthalenyl-1-pentyl-1H-indole-3-carboxamide
- CAS Number: 1338925-11-3
- PubChem CID: 54752945
- ChemSpider: 26613275
- UNII: 7FVT9P642K
- CompTox Dashboard (EPA): DTXSID50716467

Chemical and physical data
- Formula: C_{24}H_{24}N_{2}O
- Molar mass: 356.469 g·mol^{−1}
- 3D model (JSmol): Interactive image
- SMILES: CCCCCn1cc(c2c1cccc2)C(=O)Nc1cccc2c1cccc2
- InChI: InChI=1S/C24H24N2O/c1-2-3-8-16-26-17-21(20-13-6-7-15-23(20)26)24(27)25-22-14-9-11-18-10-4-5-12-19(18)22/h4-7,9-15,17H,2-3,8,16H2,1H3,(H,25,27); Key:GWCQNKRMTGVYIZ-UHFFFAOYSA-N

NNE1 (also known as NNEI, MN-24 and AM-6527) is an indole-based synthetic cannabinoid, representing a molecular hybrid of APICA and JWH-018 that is an agonist for the cannabinoid receptors, with K_{i} values of 60.09 nM at CB_{1} and 45.298 nM at CB_{2} and EC_{50} values of 9.481 nM at CB_{1} and 1.008 nM at CB_{2}. It was designed by Jos Lange at Abbott in 2010 to serve as an in vivo active pharmacological tool and has a CB_{1} receptor pEC_{50} of 8.9 with around 80x selectivity over the related CB_{2} receptor. It is suspected that metabolic hydrolysis of the amide group of NNE1 may release 1-naphthylamine, a known carcinogen, given the known metabolic liberation (and presence as an impurity) of amantadine in the related compound APINACA, and NNE1 was banned in New Zealand in 2012 as a temporary class drug to stop it being used as an ingredient in then-legal synthetic cannabis products. NNE1 was subsequently found to be responsible for the death of a man in Japan in 2014.

AM6527, a neutral CB1 receptor antagonist, suppresses opioid taking and seeking, as well as cocaine seeking in rodents without aversive effects.

== See also ==
- 5F-NNE1
- 5F-PCN
- AM-2201
- APICA
- CUMYL-PICA
- FDU-NNE1
- JWH-018
- NM-2201
- SDB-005
