= 5F-CUMYL-PINACA =

Chemical compound

Legal status
- Legal status: CA: Schedule II; DE: NpSG (Industrial and scientific use only); UK: Under Psychoactive Substances Act; US: Schedule I; Illegal in Sweden

Identifiers
- IUPAC name: 1-(5-Fluoropentyl)-N-(2-phenylpropan-2-yl)-1H-indazole-3-carboxamide
- CAS Number: 1400742-16-6
- PubChem CID: 86274158
- ChemSpider: 35228406
- UNII: E827UUV3S9
- CompTox Dashboard (EPA): DTXSID701032564

Chemical and physical data
- Formula: C_{22}H_{26}FN_{3}O
- Molar mass: 367.468 g·mol^{−1}
- 3D model (JSmol): Interactive image
- SMILES: O=C(NC(C)(C)C1=CC=CC=C1)C2=NN(CCCCCF)C3=C2C=CC=C3
- InChI: InChI=1S/C22H26FN3O/c1-22(2,17-11-5-3-6-12-17)24-21(27)20-18-13-7-8-14-19(18)26(25-20)16-10-4-9-15-23/h3,5-8,11-14H,4,9-10,15-16H2,1-2H3,(H,24,27); Key:XSHGVIPHMOTDCS-UHFFFAOYSA-N

5F-CUMYL-PINACA (also known as SGT-25 and sometimes sold in e-cigarette form as C-Liquid) is an indazole-3-carboxamide based synthetic cannabinoid. 5F-CUMYL-PINACA acts as a potent agonist for the cannabinoid receptors, with the original patent claiming approximately 4x selectivity for CB_{1}, having an EC_{50} of <0.1 nM for human CB_{1} receptors and 0.37 nM for human CB_{2} receptors. In more recent assays using different techniques, 5F-CUMYL-PINACA was variously found to have an EC_{50} of 0.43 nM at CB_{1} and 11.3 nM at CB_{2}, suggesting a somewhat higher CB_{1} selectivity of 26 times, or alternatively 15.1 nM at CB_{1} and 34.8 nM at CB_{2} with only 2.3 times selectivity, however these figures cannot be directly compared due to the different assay techniques used in each case.

== Legal status ==
In the United States, 5F-CUMYL-PINACA was temporarily emergency scheduled by the DEA in 2019. and made a permanent Schedule I Controlled Substance on April 7, 2022. Sweden's public health agency suggested classifying 5F-CUMYL-PINACA as a hazardous substance on November 10, 2014.

== See also ==
- 5F-SDB-006
- CUMYL-4CN-BINACA
- CUMYL-PICA
- CUMYL-PINACA
- CUMYL-THPINACA
- SDB-006
- NNE1
