= CUMYL-THPINACA =

Chemical compound

Legal status
- Legal status: CA: Schedule II; DE: NpSG (Industrial and scientific use only); UK: Class B; Illegal in China and Sweden

Identifiers
- IUPAC name: 1-(oxan-4-ylmethyl)-N-(2-phenylpropan-2-yl)indazole-3-carboxamide
- CAS Number: 1400742-50-8
- PubChem CID: 86273679
- ChemSpider: 48057932
- UNII: 6R5GTC3QVB
- CompTox Dashboard (EPA): DTXSID401032565

Chemical and physical data
- Formula: C_{23}H_{27}N_{3}O_{2}
- Molar mass: 377.488 g·mol^{−1}
- 3D model (JSmol): Interactive image
- SMILES: O=C(NC(C)(C)C1=CC=CC=C1)C2=NN(CC3CCOCC3)C4=C2C=CC=C4
- InChI: InChI=1S/C23H27N3O2/c1-23(2,18-8-4-3-5-9-18)24-22(27)21-19-10-6-7-11-20(19)26(25-21)16-17-12-14-28-15-13-17/h3-11,17H,12-16H2,1-2H3,(H,24,27); Key:HINCNLQQLQFMRD-UHFFFAOYSA-N

CUMYL-THPINACA (also known as SGT-42) is an indazole-3-carboxamide based synthetic cannabinoid. CUMYL-THPINACA acts as a potent agonist for the cannabinoid receptors, with approximately 6x selectivity for CB_{1}, having an EC_{50} of 0.1nM for human CB_{1} receptors and 0.59nM for human CB_{2} receptors.

== Legal status ==
Sweden's public health agency suggested to classify CUMYL-THPINACA as hazardous substance on November 10, 2014.

As of October 2015 CUMYL-THPINACA is a controlled substance in China.

== See also ==
- 5F-CUMYL-PINACA
- 5F-SDB-006
- ADAMANTYL-THPINACA
- CUMYL-4CN-BINACA
- CUMYL-CBMINACA
- CUMYL-PICA
- CUMYL-PINACA
- SDB-006
- NNE1
