= STS-135 (drug) =

Chemical compound

Legal status
- Legal status: CA: Schedule II; DE: Anlage II (Authorized trade only, not prescriptible); NZ: Temporary Class; UK: Class B

Identifiers
- IUPAC name: N-(Adamantan-1-yl)-1-(5-fluoropentyl)-1H-indole-3-carboxamide
- CAS Number: 1354631-26-7
- PubChem CID: 57404059
- ChemSpider: 28189067
- UNII: E6917946XH
- CompTox Dashboard (EPA): DTXSID40725427

Chemical and physical data
- Formula: C_{24}H_{31}FN_{2}O
- Molar mass: 382.523 g·mol^{−1}
- 3D model (JSmol): Interactive image
- SMILES: FCCCCCn1cc(c2c1cccc2)C(=O)NC12CC3CC(C2)CC(C1)C3
- InChI: InChI=1S/C24H31FN2O/c25-8-4-1-5-9-27-16-21(20-6-2-3-7-22(20)27)23(28)26-24-13-17-10-18(14-24)12-19(11-17)15-24/h2-3,6-7,16-19H,1,4-5,8-15H2,(H,26,28); Key:COYHGVCHRRXECF-UHFFFAOYSA-N

STS-135 (N-(adamantan-1-yl)-1-(5-fluoropentyl)-1H-indole-3-carboxamide, also called 5F-APICA and ACBM-2201) is a designer drug offered by online vendors as a cannabimimetic agent. The structure of STS-135 appears to use an understanding of structure-activity relationships within the indole class of cannabimimetics, although its design origins are unclear. STS-135 is the terminally-fluorinated analogue of SDB-001, just as AM-2201 is the terminally-fluorinated analogue of JWH-018, and XLR-11 is the terminally-fluorinated analogue of UR-144. STS-135 acts a potent cannabinoid receptor agonist in vitro, with an EC_{50} of 51 nM for human CB_{2} receptors, and 13 nM for human CB_{1} receptors. STS-135 produces bradycardia and hypothermia in rats at doses of 1–10 mg/kg, suggesting cannabinoid-like activity. It was first detected in 2013.

== Legal status ==
As of October 2015 STS-135 is a controlled substance in China. It is also illegal in the UK.

== Detection ==
A forensic standard of STS-135 is available, and the compound has been posted on the Forendex website of potential drugs of abuse.

== See also ==
- AB-001
- ADAMANTYL-THPINACA
- APICA
- APINACA
- AM-2201
- JWH-018
- UR-144
- XLR-11
