= List of cannabinoids =

This page is a list of cannabinoids, or cannabinoid receptor agonists.

== Endocannabinoids ==
- Anandamide (ANA), also known as N-arachidonoylethanolamine (AEA)
- 2-Arachidonoylglycerol (2-AG)
- 2-Arachidonyl glyceryl ether (noladin ether)
- N-Arachidonoyl dopamine (NADA)
- Virodhamine, also known as O-arachidonoyl ethanolamine (OAE or O-AEA)
- Lysophosphatidylinositol (LPI)

== Phytocannabinoids ==
- Δ^{9}-Tetrahydrocannabinol (Δ^{9}-THC), agonist; the primary active constituent of cannabis
  - 11-hydroxy-Δ^{9}-THC, agonist; an active metabolite of orally administered Δ^{9}-THC; not technically a phytocannabinoid
- Cannabidiol (CBD), negative allosteric modulator, another major active constituent of cannabis
- Cannabinol (CBN), a minor active constituent of cannabis, also a metabolite of THC and a product of its degradation
- Tetrahydrocannabivarin (THCV), a minor active constituent of cannabis

== Synthetic cannabinoids ==
- (C6)-CP 47,497
- (C9)-CP 47,497
- 1-Butyl-3-(2-methoxybenzoyl)indole
- 1-Butyl-3-(4-methoxybenzoyl)indole
- 1-Pentyl-3-(2-methoxybenzoyl)indole
- 2-Isopropyl-5-methyl-1-
  (2,6-dihydroxy-4-nonylphenyl)cyclohex-1-ene
- 4-HTMPIPO
- 4-Nonylphenylboronic acid
- 5Br-UR-144
- 5Cl-APINACA
- 5Cl-UR-144
- 5F-3-pyridinoylindole
- 5F-AB-FUPPYCA
- 5F-ADB-PINACA
- 5F-ADBICA
- 5F-ADB
- 5F-AMB
- 5F-APINACA
- 5F-CUMYL-PINACA
- 5F-EMB-PINACA
- 5F-NNE1
- 5F-PB-22
- 5F-PCN
- 5F-PY-PICA
- 5F-PY-PINACA
- 5F-SDB-006
- HHC
- A-796,260
- A-834,735
- A-836,339
- A-955,840
- A-40174
- A-41988
- A-42574
- AB-001
- AB-CHFUPYCA
- AB-CHMFUPPYCA
- AB-CHMINACA
- AB-FUBICA
- AB-FUBINACA 2-fluorobenzyl isomer
- AB-FUBINACA
- AB-PICA
- AB-PINACA
- Abnormal cannabidiol
- ADAMANTYL-THPINACA
- ADB-CHMINACA
- ADB-FUBICA
- ADB-FUBINACA
- ADB-PINACA
- ADBICA
- ADSB-FUB-187
- Ajulemic acid
- AM-087
- AM-411
- AM-630
- AM-630
- AM-679
- AM-694
- AM-855
- AM-883
- AM-905
- AM-906
- AM-919
- AM-926
- AM-938
- AM-1220
- AM-1221
- AM-1235
- AM-1241
- AM-1248
- AM-1346
- AM-1387
- AM-1714
- AM-2201
- AM-2232
- AM-2233
- AM-2389
- AM-4030
- AM-4113
- AM-6527
- AM-6545
- AM-251
- AM-281
- AM-404
- AMB-CHMINACA
- AMB-FUBINACA
- AMG-1
- AMG-3
- AMG-36
- AMG-41
- APICA
- APINACA, also known as 'AKB48'
- APP-FUBINACA
- Arachidonoyl serotonin
- ACEA
- ACPA
- Arvanil
- AZ-11713908
- BAY 38-7271
- BAY 59-3074
- BIM-018
- Biochanin A
- BML-190
- Nabidrox (Canbisol)
- Cannabicyclohexanol
- Cannabipiperidiethanone
- CAY-10401
- CAY-10429
- CAY-10508
- CB-13
- CB-25
- CB-52
- CB-86
- CB-86
- CBS-0550
- CP 47,497
- CP 55,244
- CP 55,940
- CUMYL-5F-PICA
- CUMYL-BICA
- CUMYL-PICA
- CUMYL-PINACA
- CUMYL-THPINACA
- Dexanabinol, also known as 'HU-211'
- Dimethylheptylpyran, also known as 'DMHP'
- Drinabant, also known as 'AVE1625'
- Dronabinol
- EAM-2201
- EMB-FUBINACA
- FAB-144
- FDU-NNE1
- FDU-PB-22
- FUB-144
- FUB-APINACA
- FUB-JWH-018
- FUB-PB-22
- FUBIMINA
- Genistein
- GW-405,833, also known as 'L-768,242'
- GW-842,166X
- Hemopressin
- Hexahydrocannabinol
- HU-210
- HU-243
- HU-308
- HU-320
- HU-331
- HU-336
- HU-345
- HU-910
- Ibipinabant, also known as 'SLV319'
- IDFP
- JNJ 1661010
- JTE-907
- JTE 7-31
- JWH-007
- JWH-015
- JWH-018
- JWH-019
- JWH-030
- JWH-051
- JWH-073
- JWH-081
- JWH-098
- JWH-116
- JWH-122
- JWH-133
- JWH-139
- JWH-147
- JWH-149
- JWH-161
- JWH-164
- JWH-167
- JWH-175
- JWH-176
- JWH-182
- JWH-184
- JWH-185
- JWH-192
- JWH-193
- JWH-194
- JWH-195
- JWH-196
- JWH-197
- JWH-198
- JWH-199
- JWH-200
- JWH-203
- JWH-210
- JWH-229
- JWH-249
- JWH-250
- JWH-251
- JWH-302
- JWH-307
- JWH-359
- JWH-369
- JWH-370
- JWH-398
- JWH-424
- JZL184
- JZL195
- Kaempferol
- KM-233
- L-759,633
- L-759,656
- LASSBio-881
- LBP-1
- Leelamine
- Levonantradol, also known as 'CP 50,5561'
- LH-21
- LY-320,135
- LY-2183240
- MAM-2201
- MDA-7
- MDA-19
- MDA-77
- MDMB-CHMICA
- MDMB-CHMINACA
- MDMB-FUBINACA
- Menabitan
- MEPIRAPIM
- Methanandamide, also known as 'AM-356'
- MJ-15
- MK-9470
- MMB-2201
- MN-18
- MN-25, also known as 'UR-12'
- Nabazenil
- Nabilone
- Nabitan
- Naboctate
- NESS-0327
- NESS-040C5
- NIDA-41020
- NM-2201
- NMP-7
- NNE1
- Nonabine
- O-224
- O-581
- O-585
- O-606
- O-689
- O-774
- O-806
- O-823
- O-889
- O-1057
- O-1125
- O-1184
- O-1191
- O-1238
- O-1248
- O-1269
- O-1270
- O-1376
- O-1399
- O-1422
- O-1601
- O-1602
- O-1624
- O-1656
- O-1657
- O-1660
- O-1812
- O-1860
- O-1861
- O-1871
- O-1918
- O-2048
- O-2050
- O-2093
- O-2113
- O-2220
- O-2365
- O-2372
- O-2373
- O-2383
- O-2426
- O-2484
- O-2545
- O-2654
- O-2694
- O-2715
- O-2716
- O-3223
- O-3226
- Oleoylethanolamide, also known as 'OEA'
- Olvanil
- Org 27569
- Org 27759
- Org 28312
- Org 28611
- Org 29647
- Otenabant, also known as 'CP-945,598'
- Palmitoylethanolamide, also known as 'PEA'
- Parahexyl
- PF-03550096
- PF-04457845
- PF-622
- PF-750
- PF-3845
- PF-514273
- PHOP
- PipISB
- Pirnabine
- Pravadoline
- Pregnenolone
- PSB-SB-487
- PSB-SB-1202
- PTI-1
- PTI-2
- PX-1
- PX-2
- PX-3
- QUCHIC, also known as 'BB-22'
- QUPIC, also known as 'PB-22'
- RCS-4
- RCS-8
- Rimonabant, also known as 'SR141716'
- Rosonabant, also known as 'E-6776'
- RTI-371
- S-444,823
- SDB-006
- SER-601
- SPA-229
- SR-144,528
- STS-135
- Surinabant, also known as 'SR147778'
- Taranabant, also known as 'MK-0364'
- Tedalinab
- THC-O-acetate
- THC-O-phosphate
- THJ-018
- THJ-2201
- Tinabinol
- TM-38837
- UR-144
- URB-447
- URB-447
- URB-597
- URB-602
- URB-754
- VCHSR
- VDM-11
- VSN-16
- WIN 54,461
- WIN 55,212-2
- WIN 56,098
- XLR-11
- Yangonin

== See also ==
- List of drugs
- List of designer drugs § Synthetic cannabinoids
