= JWH-149 =

Chemical compound

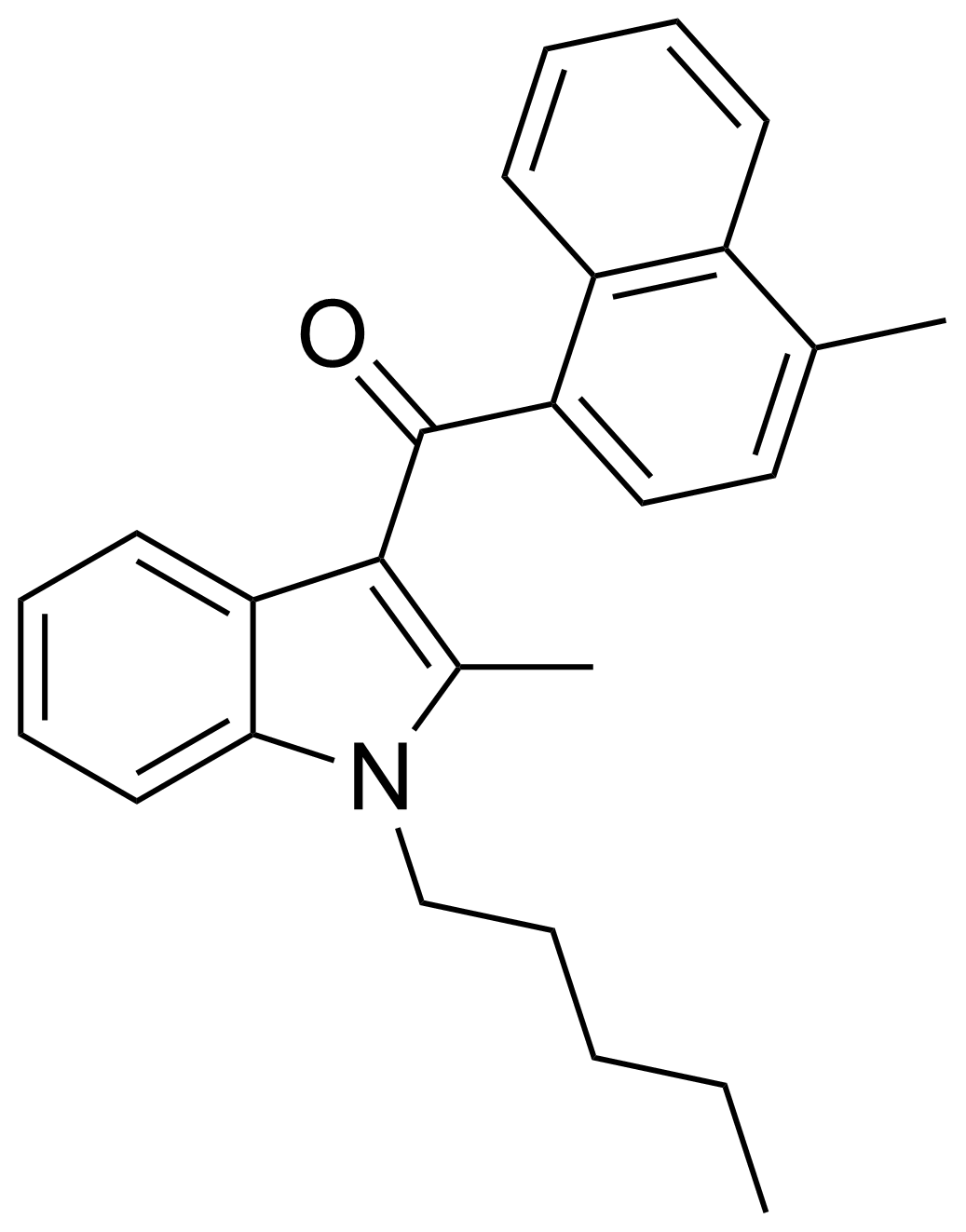

Legal status
- Legal status: CA: Schedule II; DE: NpSG (Industrial and scientific use only); UK: Class B; US: Schedule I

Identifiers
- IUPAC name: (4-Methyl-1-naphthalenyl)(2-methyl-1-pentyl-1H-indol-3-yl)methanone
- CAS Number: 548461-82-1
- PubChem CID: 45267820
- ChemSpider: 24627235
- UNII: AWD731Y25Z
- CompTox Dashboard (EPA): DTXSID40203331

Chemical and physical data
- Formula: C_{26}H_{27}NO
- Molar mass: 369.508 g·mol^{−1}
- 3D model (JSmol): Interactive image
- SMILES: c4cccc1c4c(ccc1C)C(=O)c3c2ccccc2n(c3C)CCCCC
- InChI: InChI=1S/C26H27NO/c1-4-5-10-17-27-19(3)25(23-13-8-9-14-24(23)27)26(28)22-16-15-18(2)20-11-6-7-12-21(20)22/h6-9,11-16H,4-5,10,17H2,1-3H3; Key:JTJAMXUOXJGSCW-UHFFFAOYSA-N

JWH-149 is a synthetic cannabimimetic that was discovered by John W. Huffman. It is the N-pentyl analog of JWH-148. It is a potent but only moderately selective ligand for the CB_{2} receptor, with a binding affinity of K_{i} = 0.73 ± 0.03 nM at this subtype, and more than six times selectivity over the CB_{1} subtype.

In the United States, all CB_{1} receptor agonists of the 3-(1-naphthoyl)indole class such as JWH-149 are Schedule I Controlled Substances.

== See also ==
- JWH-120
- JWH-122
- JWH-148
- JWH-193
- JWH-210
- JWH-398
