= 5F-AB-FUPPYCA =

Chemical compound

Legal status
- Legal status: BR: Class F2 (Prohibited psychotropics); CA: Schedule II; DE: NpSG (Industrial and scientific use only); UK: Under Psychoactive Substances Act

Identifiers
- IUPAC name: N-(1-Amino-3-methyl-1-oxobutan-2-yl)-1-(5-fluoropentyl)-5-(4-fluorophenyl)-1H-pyrazole-3-carboxamide
- CAS Number: 2044702-46-5
- PubChem CID: 129317827
- ChemSpider: 58191440
- UNII: 2G6G797F5B

Chemical and physical data
- Formula: C_{20}H_{26}F_{2}N_{4}O_{2}
- Molar mass: 392.451 g·mol^{−1}
- 3D model (JSmol): Interactive image
- SMILES: NC(C(C(C)C)NC(=O)C1=NN(C(=C1)C1=CC=C(C=C1)F)CCCCCF)=O
- InChI: InChI=1/C20H26F2N4O2/c1-13(2)18(19(23)27)24-20(28)16-12-17(14-6-8-15(22)9-7-14)26(25-16)11-5-3-4-10-21/h6-9,12-13,18H,3-5,10-11H2,1-2H3,(H2,23,27)(H,24,28)/f/h24H,23H2; Key:GSXRDTDYPSATDE-UHFFFAOYSA-N

5F-AB-FUPPYCA (also known as AZ-037) is a pyrazole-based synthetic cannabinoid that is presumed to be an agonist of the CB_{1} receptor and has been sold online as a designer drug. It was first detected by the EMCDDA as part of a seizure of 540 g white powder in France in February 2015.

The name AZ-037 is also used as a synonym for its structural isomer 5-fluoro-3,5-AB-PFUPPYCA. Thus AZ-037 is being used as a synonym for two different compounds.

5-fluoro-3,5-AB-PFUPPYCA has been detected in synthetic cannabinoid smoke blends in the US as early as December 30, 2021, along with ADB-BUTINACA, MDA-19 (BZO-HEXOXIZID) and MDMB-4en-PINACA.

5-fluoro-AB-PFUPPYCA contains some similar structural elements to other synthetic cannabinoids such as AB-CHFUPYCA, JWH-307, JWH-030, JWH-147, AB-PINACA. It may be considered an analog of the traditional pyrazole cannabinoid receptor 1 antagonist rimonabant. The pharmacological properties of 5F-AB-FUPPYCA have not been studied.

== Legality ==
In the United States, 5F-AB-FUPPYCA is unscheduled at the federal level as of May 22, 2023. It's possible that it may be considered under the federal analogue act as a functional analog due to pharmacology or as a distant structural analog of JWH-307.

North Dakota has placed 5F-AB-FUPPYCA (N-(1-carbamoyl-2-methyl-propyl)-2-(5-fluoropentyl)-5-(4-fluorophenyl)pyrazole-3-carboxamide) into Schedule I status on 04/27/2023. However, this did not include structural substitutions it gave to other cannabinoid structural classes. As such does not include other pyrazoles analogs such as the non-fluorinated AB-FUPPYCA analog.

== See also ==
- AB-CHFUPYCA
- AM-6545
- TM-38837
- Rimonabant
- JWH-307
- JWH-147
- JWH-030
- AB-FUBINACA
- ADB-FUBINACA
- AMB-FUBINACA
- APP-FUBINACA
- MDA-19
- FUB-144
- FUB-APINACA
- FUB-JWH-018
- FDU-PB-22
- FUB-PB-22
- MDMB-FUBICA
- MDMB-FUBINACA
