= JWH-148 =

Chemical compound

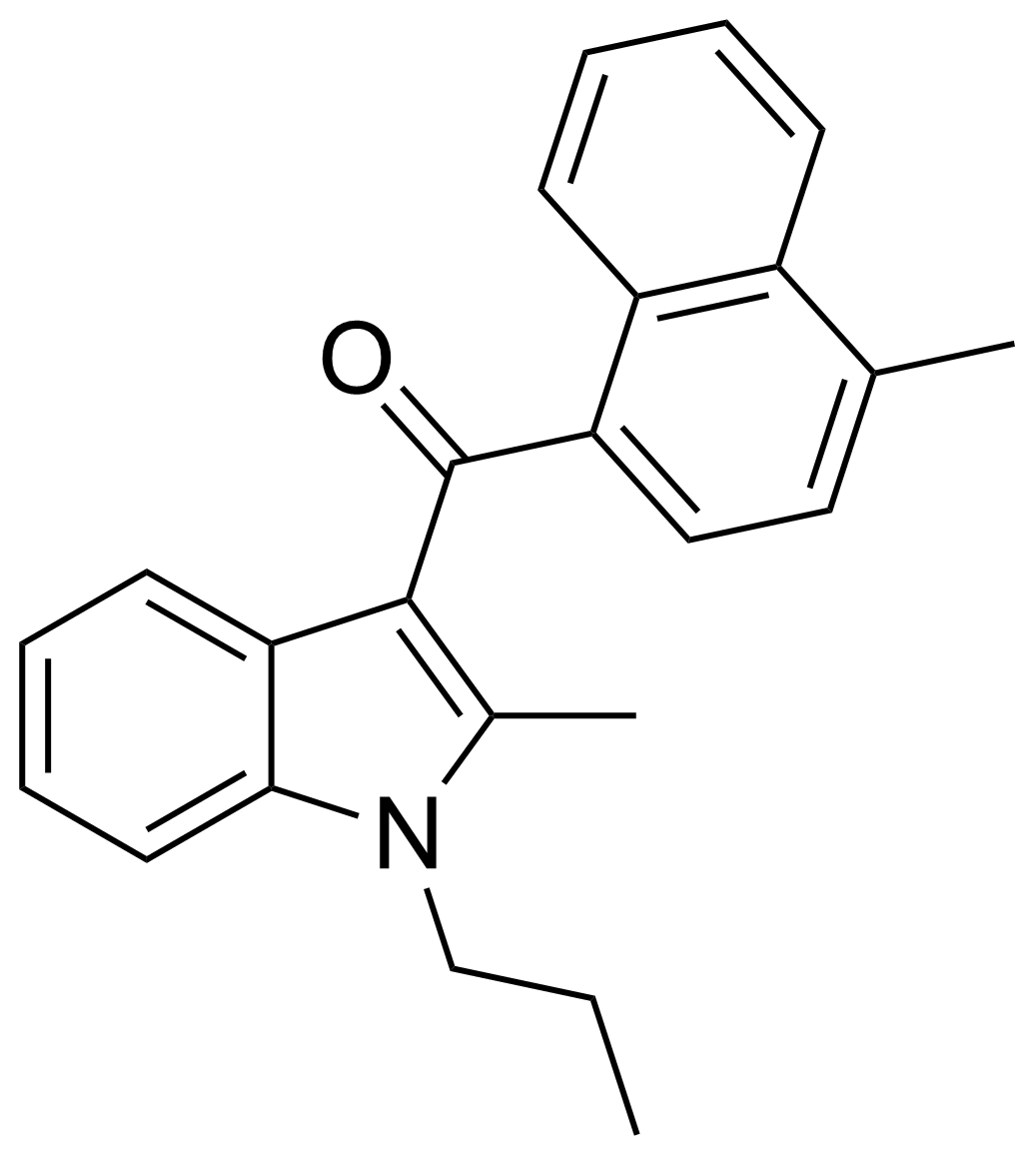

Legal status
- Legal status: US: Schedule I

Identifiers
- IUPAC name: (4-Methyl-1-naphthalenyl)(2-methyl-1-propyl-1H-indol-3-yl)methanone
- CAS Number: 824955-99-9
- PubChem CID: 45267819
- ChemSpider: 24627234
- UNII: GJ5UPV38RK
- CompTox Dashboard (EPA): DTXSID00669858

Chemical and physical data
- Formula: C_{24}H_{23}NO
- Molar mass: 341.454 g·mol^{−1}
- 3D model (JSmol): Interactive image
- SMILES: CCCN1C(=C(C2=CC=CC=C21)C(=O)C3=CC=C(C4=CC=CC=C43)C)C
- InChI: InChI=1S/C24H23NO/c1-4-15-25-17(3)23(21-11-7-8-12-22(21)25)24(26)20-14-13-16(2)18-9-5-6-10-19(18)20/h5-14H,4,15H2,1-3H3; Key:WRIOMNWYCFMMEY-UHFFFAOYSA-N

JWH-148 is a synthetic cannabimimetic that was discovered by John W. Huffman. It is the indole 2-methyl analog of JWH-120. It is a moderately selective ligand for the CB_{2} receptor, with a binding affinity of K_{i} = 14.0 ± 1.0 nM at this subtype, and more than eight times selectivity over the CB_{1} subtype.

In the United States, all CB_{1} receptor agonists of the 3-(1-naphthoyl)indole class such as JWH-148 are Schedule I Controlled Substances.

== See also ==
- JWH-120
- JWH-122
- JWH-193
- JWH-210
- JWH-398
