= C19H24O3 =

The molecular formula C_{19}H_{24}O_{3} may refer to:

- Adrenosterone
- 4-Androstene-3,6,17-trione
- Methoxyestrones
  - 2-Methoxyestrone
  - 4-Methoxyestrone
- Pirnabine
- Prallethrin
- Testolactone
