= AB-CHFUPYCA =

Chemical compound

Legal status
- Legal status: CA: Schedule II; DE: NpSG (Industrial and scientific use only); UK: Under Psychoactive Substances Act

Identifiers
- IUPAC name: N-(1-amino-3-methyl-1-oxobutan-2-yl)-1-(cyclohexylmethyl)-3-(4-fluorophenyl)-1H-pyrazole-5-carboxamide
- CAS Number: 1870799-79-3
- PubChem CID: 122213879
- ChemSpider: 67168777
- UNII: O4PS4BDB8K
- CompTox Dashboard (EPA): DTXSID401009994

Chemical and physical data
- Formula: C_{22}H_{29}FN_{4}O_{2}
- Molar mass: 400.498 g·mol^{−1}
- 3D model (JSmol): Interactive image
- SMILES: O=C(NC(C(N)=O)C(C)C)C1=CC(C2=CC=C(F)C=C2)=NN1CC3CCCCC3
- InChI: InChI=1S/C22H29FN4O2/c1-14(2)20(21(24)28)25-22(29)19-12-18(16-8-10-17(23)11-9-16)26-27(19)13-15-6-4-3-5-7-15/h8-12,14-15,20H,3-7,13H2,1-2H3,(H2,24,28)(H,25,29); Key:NDYOOVJIZQTGHY-UHFFFAOYSA-N

AB-CHFUPYCA (also AB-CHMFUPPYCA) is a compound that was first identified as a component of synthetic cannabis products in Japan in 2015. The name "AB-CHFUPYCA" is an acronym of its systematic name N-(1-Amino-3-methyl-1-oxoButan-2-yl)-1-(CycloHexylmethyl)-3-(4-FlUorophenyl)-1H-PYrazole-5-CarboxAmide. There are two known regioisomers of AB-CHFUPYCA: 3,5-AB-CHMFUPPYCA (pictured) and 5,3-AB-CHMFUPPYCA. The article[1] refers to both 3,5-AB-CHMFUPPYCA and 5,3-AB-CHMFUPPYCA as AB-CHMFUPPYCA isomers, so AB-CHMFUPPYCA and AB-CHFUPYCA are not names for a unique chemical structure.

AB-CHFUPYCA contains some similar structural elements to other synthetic cannabinoids such as 5F-AB-FUPPYCA, JWH-307, JWH-030, JWH-147, AB-PINACA. It may be considered an analog of the traditional pyrazole cannabinoid receptor 1 antagonist rimonabant. The pharmacological properties of AB-CHFUPYCA have not been studied.

== See also ==
- 5F-AB-FUPPYCA
- AM-6545
- TM-38837
- Rimonabant
- JWH-307
- JWH-147
- JWH-030
- 5F-PB22
- 5F-AB-PINACA
- 5F-ADB
- 5F-AMB
- 5F-APINACA
- AB-CHMFUPPYCA
- AB-FUBINACA
- AB-PINACA
- ADB-CHMINACA
- ADB-FUBINACA
- ADB-PINACA
- ADBICA
- APICA
- APINACA
- MDMB-CHMICA
