= C23H27NO2 =

The molecular formula C_{23}H_{27}NO_{2} (molar mass: 349.47 g/mol) may refer to:

- O-823
- R1317
