= C26H40O2 =

The molecular formula C_{26}H_{40}O_{2} (molar mass: 384.59 g/mol, exact mass: 384.3028 u) may refer to:

- L-759,656
- L-759,633
