= C22H29N3O2 =

The molecular formula C_{22}H_{29}N_{3}O_{2} (molar mass: 367.48 g/mol, exact mass: 367.2260 u) may refer to:

- O-1238
- 18-Methylaminocoronaridine (18-MAC)
