= Delta-8-THCM =

Identifiers
- IUPAC name: (6aR,10aR)-1-methoxy-6,6,9-trimethyl-3-pentyl-6a,7,10,10a-tetrahydrobenzo[c]chromene
- CAS Number: 1451-20-3
- PubChem CID: 15114753
- ChemSpider: 19975471
- ChEMBL: ChEMBL114082

Chemical and physical data
- Formula: C_{22}H_{32}O_{2}
- Molar mass: 328.496 g·mol^{−1}
- 3D model (JSmol): Interactive image
- SMILES: CCCCCC1=CC2=C([C@@H]3CC(=CC[C@H]3C(O2)(C)C)C)C(=C1)OC
- InChI: InChI=1S/C22H32O2/c1-6-7-8-9-16-13-19(23-5)21-17-12-15(2)10-11-18(17)22(3,4)24-20(21)14-16/h10,13-14,17-18H,6-9,11-12H2,1-5H3/t17-,18-/m1/s1; Key:GRLARWXSTOXAGR-QZTJIDSGSA-N

Delta-8-THCM (O-Methyl-Δ^{8}-THC) is a chemical compound related to phytocannabinoids found in Cannabis. It has been sold as a designer drug, first identified in Sweden in June 2024. However, it is a known compound which has been well established to almost entirely lack cannabinoid-like effects in mice, rats and monkeys, unlike the dimethylheptyl analogue L-759,633 which is a selective agonist for CB_{2} and has antiinflammatory but not psychoactive effects.

== See also ==
- Cannabidiol dimethyl ether
- L-759,656
