= C24H23NO =

The molecular formula C_{24}H_{23}NO (molar mass: 341.44 g/mol, exact mass: 341.1780 u) may refer to:

- JWH-018, also known as 1-pentyl-3-(1-naphthoyl)indole or AM-678
- JWH-148
