= C26H39NO3 =

The molecular formula C_{26}H_{39}NO_{3} (molar mass: 413.602 g/mol) may refer to:

- AM-11245
- O-1125
