= AM-2389 =

Chemical compound

Identifiers
- IUPAC name: (6aR,9R,10aR)-3-(1-hexylcyclobut-1-yl)-6a,7,8,9,10,10a-hexahydro-6,6-dimethyl-6H-dibenzo[b,d]pyran-1,9 diol
- CAS Number: 1256842-49-5
- PubChem CID: 49783410
- ChemSpider: 26333264
- UNII: GGT8LM8A2O
- CompTox Dashboard (EPA): DTXSID70678538

Chemical and physical data
- Formula: C_{25}H_{38}O_{3}
- Molar mass: 386.576 g·mol^{−1}
- 3D model (JSmol): Interactive image
- SMILES: OC1=C([C@@H]2C[C@@H](CC[C@H]2C(C)(O3)C)O)C3=CC(C4(CCC4)CCCCCC)=C1
- InChI: InChI=1S/C25H38O3/c1-4-5-6-7-11-25(12-8-13-25)17-14-21(27)23-19-16-18(26)9-10-20(19)24(2,3)28-22(23)15-17/h14-15,18-20,26-27H,4-13,16H2,1-3H3/t18-,19-,20-/m1/s1; Key:CSXKNESDVLECTJ-VAMGGRTRSA-N

AM-2389 is a classical cannabinoid derivative which acts as a potent and reasonably selective agonist for the CB_{1} receptor, with a K_{i} of 0.16 nM, and 26× selectivity over the related CB_{2} receptor. It has high potency in animal tests of cannabinoid activity, and a medium duration of action. Replacing the 1',1'-dimethyl substitution of the dimethylheptyl side chain of classical cannabinoids with cyclopropyl or cyclopentyl results in higher potency than cyclobutyl, but only the cyclobutyl derivatives show selectivity for CB_{1} over CB_{2}. High selectivity for CB_{1} over CB_{2} is difficult to achieve (cf. AM-906, AM-1235), as almost all commonly used CB_{1} agonists have similar or greater affinity for CB_{2} than CB_{1}, and the only truly highly selective CB_{1} agonists known as of 2012 are eicosanoid derivatives such as O-1812.

== See also ==
- HHC
- AMG-36
- AMG-41
