= C20H28FN3O3 =

The molecular formula C_{20}H_{28}FN_{3}O_{3} (molar mass: 377.453 g/mol, exact mass: 377.2115 u) may refer to:

- 5F-ADB
- 5F-EMB-PINACA
