= AMG-1 =

Chemical compound

Identifiers
- IUPAC name: (6aR,10aR)-3-(Hept-1-ynyl)-6,6,9-trimethyl-6a,7,10,10a-tetrahydrobenzo[c]chromen-1-ol
- CAS Number: 205746-46-9
- PubChem CID: 10830874
- ChemSpider: 9006174
- UNII: Q7S86DY7UF
- ChEMBL: ChEMBL279147

Chemical and physical data
- Formula: C_{23}H_{30}O_{2}
- Molar mass: 338.491 g·mol^{−1}
- 3D model (JSmol): Interactive image
- SMILES: CC=3CC1c2c(O)cc(C#CCCCCC)cc2OC(C)(C)C1CC=3
- InChI: InChI=1S/C23H30O2/c1-5-6-7-8-9-10-17-14-20(24)22-18-13-16(2)11-12-19(18)23(3,4)25-21(22)15-17/h11,14-15,18-19,24H,5-8,12-13H2,1-4H3/t18-,19-/m1/s1; Key:PYCLMAJRHLLHNO-RTBURBONSA-N

AMG-1 (part of the AM cannabinoid series) is an analgesic drug which is a cannabinoid agonist. It is a derivative of Δ^{8}-THC with a rigidified and extended 3-position side chain. AMG-1 is a potent agonist at both CB_{1} and CB_{2} with moderate selectivity for CB_{1}, with a K_{i} of 0.6 nM at CB_{1} vs 3.1 nM at CB_{2}.

== See also ==
- O-823
- AMG-41
