= MA-CHMINACA =

MA-CHMINACA may refer to:

- ADB-CHMINACA, an analgesic medication
- AMB-CHMICA
- AMB-CHMINACA, a designer drug
