= Azepane =

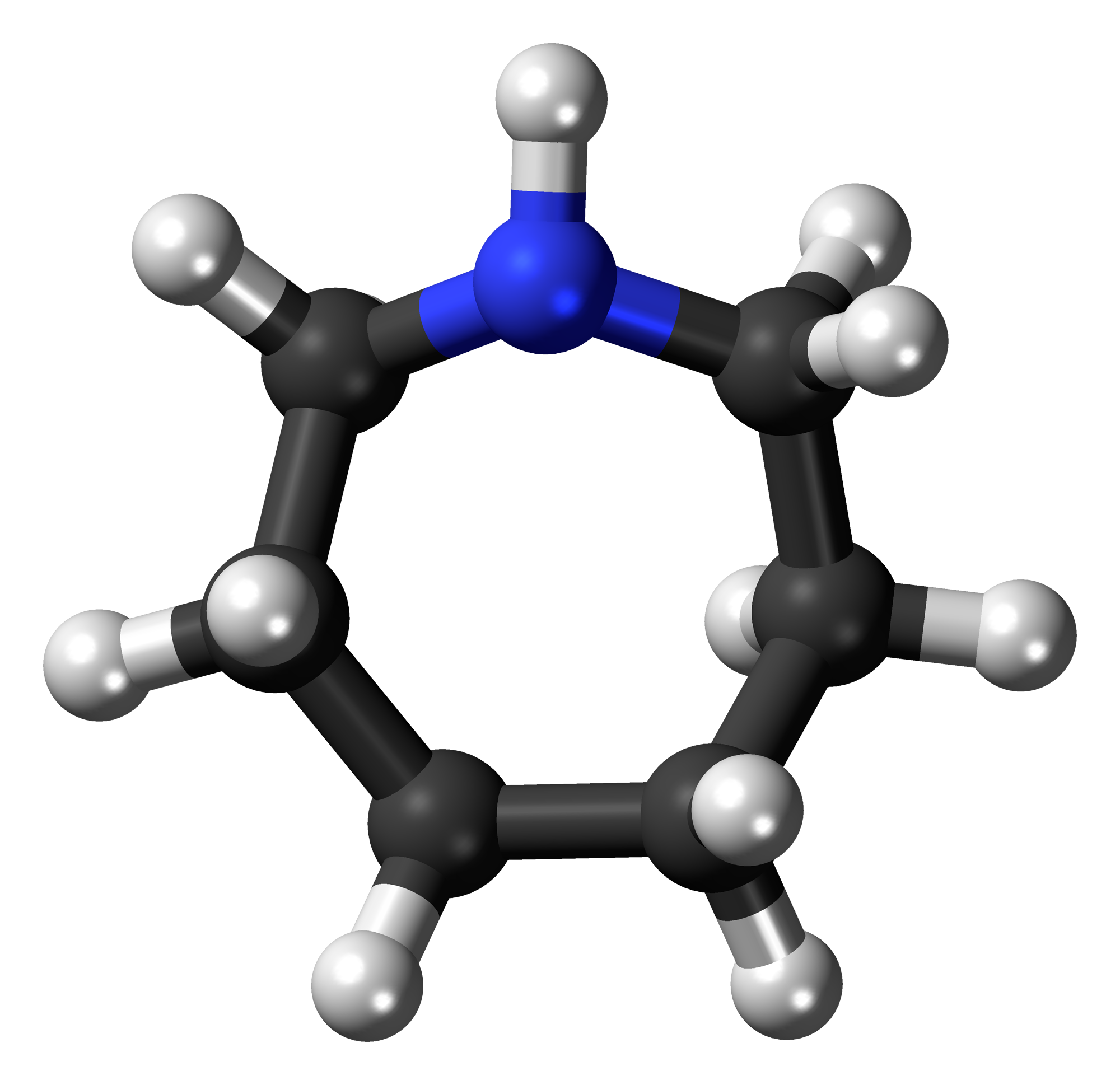

Names
- Preferred IUPAC name Azepane
- Other names: Hexahydroazepine; Hexamethyleneimine; Homopiperidine; Perhydroazepine; HMI; azacycloheptane

Identifiers
CAS Number	111-49-9
3D model (JSmol)	Interactive image
ChEBI	CHEBI:32616
ChEMBL	ChEMBL1375444
ChemSpider	7828
ECHA InfoCard	100.003.524
PubChem CID	8119
UNII	CZD076G73R
CompTox Dashboard (EPA)	DTXSID1026879
- InChI: InChI=1S/C6H13N/c1-2-4-6-7-5-3-1/h7H,1-6H2 Key: ZSIQJIWKELUFRJ-UHFFFAOYSA-N; InChI=1/C6H13N/c1-2-4-6-7-5-3-1/h7H,1-6H2 Key: ZSIQJIWKELUFRJ-UHFFFAOYAF
- SMILES: C1CCCNCC1

Properties
Chemical formula	C_{6}H_{13}N
Molar mass	99.177 g·mol^{−1}
Appearance	colorless liquid
Density	0.88 g/cm^{3}
Melting point	−37 °C (−35 °F; 236 K)
Boiling point	138 °C (280 °F; 411 K) (749 mmHg)

Hazards
Flash point	30 °C (86 °F; 303 K)
- Except where otherwise noted, data are given for materials in their standard state (at 25 °C [77 °F], 100 kPa). verify (what is ?) Infobox references

Azepane is the organic compound with the formula (CH_{2})_{6}NH. It is a colorless liquid. A cyclic secondary amine, it is a precursor to several drugs and pesticides. It is produced by partial hydrogenolysis of hexamethylene diamine.

Like many amines, it reacts with carbon dioxide.

== Azepane-containing drugs ==
A variety of pharmaceutical drugs contain an azepane ring including bazedoxifene, cetiedil, glisoxepide, mecillinam, nabazenil, setastine, and tolazamide, among others.

== See also ==
- Azepine
