= C26H26N2O3 =

The molecular formula C_{26}H_{26}N_{2}O_{3} may refer to:

- JWH-198, a drug which acts as a cannabinoid receptor agonist
- Naltrindole, a delta opioid receptor antagonist
