= JWH-120 =

Chemical compound

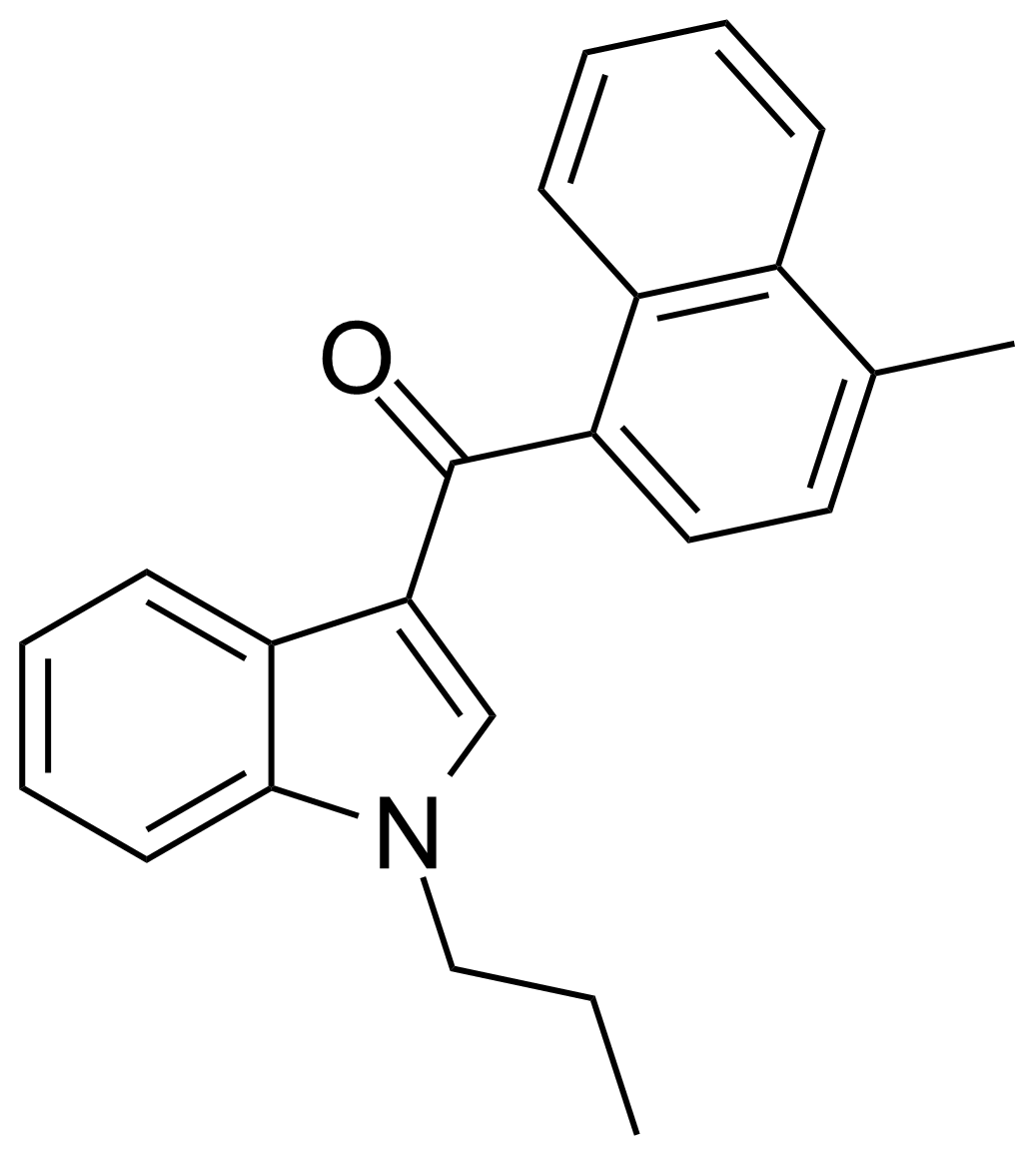

Legal status
- Legal status: US: Schedule I

Identifiers
- IUPAC name: (4-Methyl-1-naphthalenyl)(1-propyl-1H-indol-3-yl)methanone
- CAS Number: 824955-98-8
- PubChem CID: 11461586
- ChemSpider: 9636426
- UNII: J6M7L6J6PN
- ChEMBL: ChEMBL497811
- CompTox Dashboard (EPA): DTXSID20466689

Chemical and physical data
- Formula: C_{23}H_{21}NO
- Molar mass: 327.427 g·mol^{−1}
- 3D model (JSmol): Interactive image
- SMILES: CCCN1C=C(C2=CC=CC=C21)C(=O)C3=CC=C(C4=CC=CC=C43)C
- InChI: InChI=1S/C23H21NO/c1-3-14-24-15-21(19-10-6-7-11-22(19)24)23(25)20-13-12-16(2)17-8-4-5-9-18(17)20/h4-13,15H,3,14H2,1-2H3; Key:DUBUGSKBMMXSOU-UHFFFAOYSA-N

JWH-120 is a synthetic cannabimimetic that was discovered by John W. Huffman. It is the N-propyl analog of JWH-122. It is a potent and selective ligand for the CB_{2} receptor, but a weaker ligand for the CB_{1} receptor. It has a binding affinity of K_{i} = 6.1 ± 0.7 nM at the CB_{2} subtype and 173 times selectivity over the CB_{1} subtype.

In the United States, all CB_{1} receptor agonists of the 3-(1-naphthoyl)indole class such as JWH-120 are Schedule I Controlled Substances.

== See also ==
- JWH-122
- JWH-193
- JWH-210
- JWH-398
