= C23H21NO =

The molecular formula C_{23}H_{21}NO (molar mass: 327.42 g/mol, exact mass: 327.1623 u) may refer to:

- JWH-015
- JWH-073
- JWH-120
