= C24H25ClN2O =

The molecular formula C_{24}H_{25}ClN_{2}O (molar mass: 392.921 g/mol) may refer to:

- RTI-336
- RTI-371, or 3β-(4-Methylphenyl)-2β-[3-(4-chlorophenyl)isoxazol-5-yl]tropane
