= O-2694 =

Chemical compound

Identifiers
- IUPAC name: (6aR,10aR)-6,6,9-trimethyl-3-(2-methyl-7-morpholin-4-yl-7-oxoheptan-2-yl)-6a,7,10,10a-tetrahydrobenzo[c]chromen-1-yl 4-(di(propan-2-yl)amino)butanoate
- CAS Number: 874745-44-5
- PubChem CID: 11714280
- ChemSpider: 9889001
- CompTox Dashboard (EPA): DTXSID901027507

Chemical and physical data
- Formula: C_{38}H_{60}N_{2}O_{5}
- Molar mass: 624.907 g·mol^{−1}
- 3D model (JSmol): Interactive image
- SMILES: O=C(N1CCOCC1)CCCCC(c3cc2OC([C@@H]4C/C=C(\C[C@H]4c2c(OC(=O)CCCN(C(C)C)C(C)C)c3)C)(C)C)(C)C
- InChI: InChI=1S/C38H60N2O5/c1-26(2)40(27(3)4)18-12-14-35(42)44-32-24-29(37(6,7)17-11-10-13-34(41)39-19-21-43-22-20-39)25-33-36(32)30-23-28(5)15-16-31(30)38(8,9)45-33/h15,24-27,30-31H,10-14,16-23H2,1-9H3/t30-,31-/m1/s1; Key:OAFUHIZKKMQSAB-FIRIVFDPSA-N

O-2694 is a drug that is a cannabinoid derivative. It has analgesic effects and is used in scientific research. Unlike most cannabinoids discovered to date, it is highly water-soluble, which gives it considerable advantages over many related drugs. It has high affinity for both CB_{1} and CB_{2} receptors, with K_{i} values of 3.7 nM at CB_{1} and 2.8 nM at CB_{2}. However, it has complex pharmacokinetics as most of the administered dose is metabolised by hydrolysis of the ester link to the water-insoluble compound O-2372, thus producing a biphasic effects profile that is less suitable for research purposes than the related compound O-2545.

== See also ==
- O-1057
- O-2372
