= 5F-JWH-398 =

Chemical compound

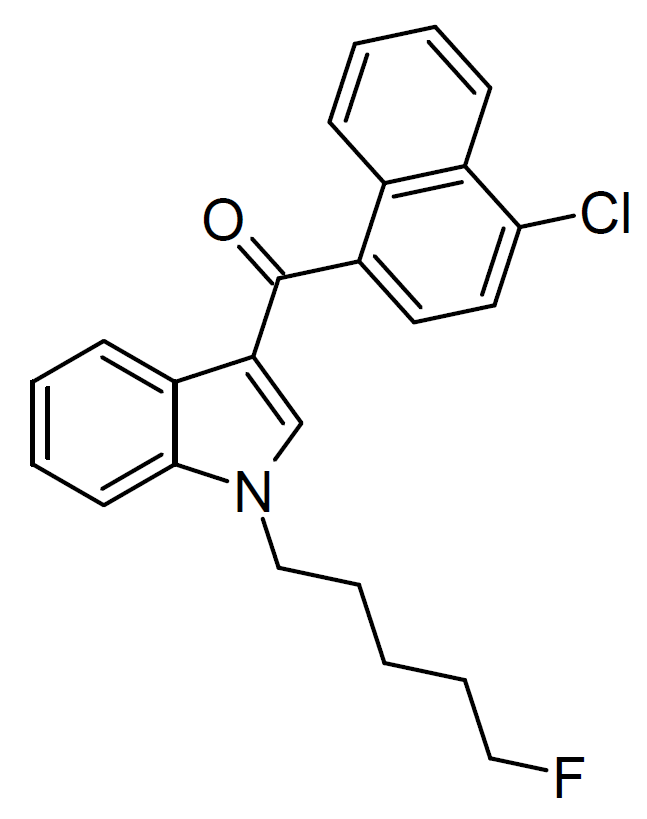

Identifiers
- IUPAC name: (4-Chloronaphthalen-1-yl)-[1-(5-fluoropentyl)indol-3-yl]methanone
- CAS Number: 1391486-12-6
- PubChem CID: 125181332
- ChemSpider: 29763749
- UNII: BAB5UV995D
- CompTox Dashboard (EPA): DTXSID701043070

Chemical and physical data
- Formula: C_{24}H_{21}ClFNO
- Molar mass: 393.89 g·mol^{−1}
- 3D model (JSmol): Interactive image
- SMILES: Clc1ccc(c2ccccc21)C(=O)c1cn(CCCCCF)c2ccccc21
- InChI: InChI=1S/C24H21ClFNO/c25-22-13-12-20(17-8-2-3-9-18(17)22)24(28)21-16-27(15-7-1-6-14-26)23-11-5-4-10-19(21)23/h2-5,8-13,16H,1,6-7,14-15H2; Key:MJSLVWWUOKKZTQ-UHFFFAOYSA-N

5F-JWH-398 (4'-chloro-AM-2201, Cl-2201, CLAM, SGT-20) is a recreational designer drug which is classed as a synthetic cannabinoid. It is from the naphthoylindole family, and produces cannabis-like effects. It was legally sold in New Zealand from 2012 to 2014 under the psychoactive substances scheme but was discontinued in May 2014 following the end of the interim approval period under the Psychoactive Substances Act 2013. Subsequently, it has appeared on the illicit market around the world and was identified in Germany in May 2019.

== See also ==
- AM-2201
- JWH-398
- MAM-2201
