= KM-233 =

Chemical compound

Clinical data
- ATC code: none

Identifiers
- IUPAC name: (−)-(6aR,7,10,10aR)-Tetrahydro-6,6,9-trimethyl-3-(1-methyl-1-phenylethyl)-6H-dibenzo[b,d]pyran-1-ol
- CAS Number: 628263-22-9
- ChemSpider: 8423597
- UNII: YMV7S3C3B7
- ChEMBL: ChEMBL119592
- CompTox Dashboard (EPA): DTXSID50745439

Chemical and physical data
- Formula: C_{25}H_{30}O_{2}
- Molar mass: 362.513 g·mol^{−1}
- 3D model (JSmol): Interactive image
- SMILES: CC1=CC[C@@H]2[C@@H](C1)C3=C(C=C(C=C3OC2(C)C)C(C)(C)C4=CC=CC=C4)O
- InChI: InChI=1S/C25H30O2/c1-16-11-12-20-19(13-16)23-21(26)14-18(15-22(23)27-25(20,4)5)24(2,3)17-9-7-6-8-10-17/h6-11,14-15,19-20,26H,12-13H2,1-5H3/t19-,20-/m1/s1; Key:GZYXCXRHVALIJD-WOJBJXKFSA-N

KM-233 is a synthetic cannabinoid drug which is a structural analog of Δ8-tetrahydrocannabinol (THC), the less active but more stable isomer of the active component of Cannabis. KM-233 differs from Δ8-THC by the pentyl side chain being replaced by a 1,1-dimethylbenzyl group. It has high binding affinity in vitro for both the CB_{1} and CB_{2} receptors, with a CB_{2} affinity of 0.91 nM and 13-fold selectivity over the CB_{1} receptor. In animal studies, it has been found to be a potential treatment for glioma, a form of brain tumor. Many related analogues are known where the 1,1-dimethylbenzyl group is substituted or replaced by other groups, with a fairly well established structure-activity relationship.

== See also ==
- AM-411
- AMG-36
