= GW-842,166X =

Chemical compound

Identifiers
- IUPAC name: 2-(2,4-dichloroanilino)-N-(tetrahydropyran-4-ylmethyl)-4-(trifluoromethyl)pyrimidine-5-carboxamide
- CAS Number: 666260-75-9
- PubChem CID: 10253143
- ChemSpider: 8428629
- UNII: VL1I6P2DZ8
- ChEMBL: ChEMBL225411
- CompTox Dashboard (EPA): DTXSID60216786

Chemical and physical data
- Formula: C_{18}H_{17}Cl_{2}F_{3}N_{4}O_{2}
- Molar mass: 449.26 g·mol^{−1}
- 3D model (JSmol): Interactive image
- SMILES: C3COCCC3CNC(=O)c1cnc(nc1C(F)(F)F)Nc2ccc(Cl)cc2Cl
- InChI: InChI=1S/C18H17Cl2F3N4O2/c19-11-1-2-14(13(20)7-11)26-17-25-9-12(15(27-17)18(21,22)23)16(28)24-8-10-3-5-29-6-4-10/h1-2,7,9-10H,3-6,8H2,(H,24,28)(H,25,26,27); Key:TWQYWUXBZHPIIV-UHFFFAOYSA-N

GW-842,166X is a drug which acts as a potent and selective cannabinoid CB_{2} receptor agonist, with a novel chemical structure based on a pyrimidine core. It has potent analgesic, anti-inflammatory and anti-hyperalgesic actions in animal models, but without cannabis-like behavioural effects due to its extremely low affinity for the CB_{1} receptor. GSK brought this compound for into 4 clinical trials, two of them related to pain management and the other two related to bio-distributions. The trials were either withdrawn or completed without posting result.

== See also ==
- LY2828360
