= LY2828360 =

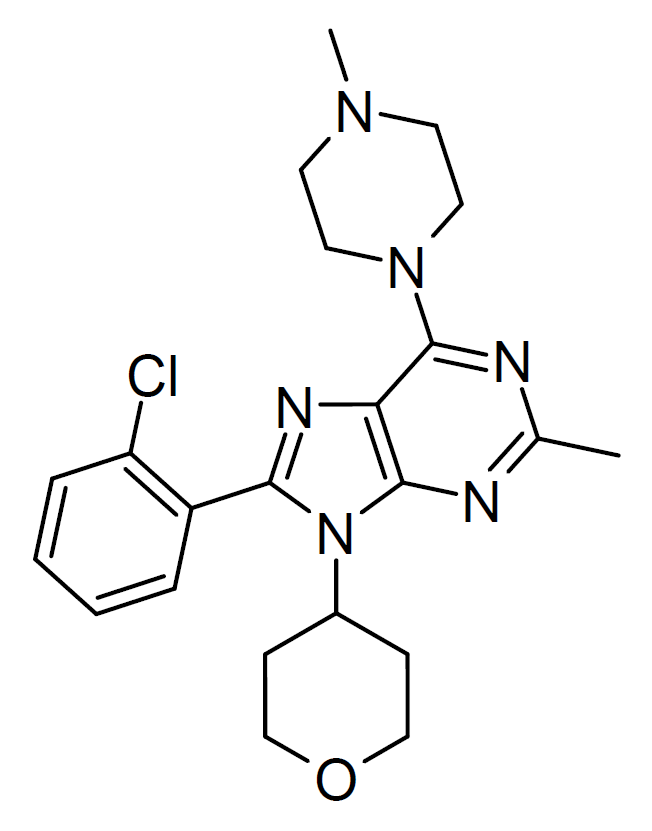

Identifiers
- IUPAC name: 8-(2-chlorophenyl)-2-methyl-6-(4-methylpiperazin-1-yl)-9-(oxan-4-yl)purine
- CAS Number: 1231220-79-3
- PubChem CID: 46833780
- DrugBank: DB16074
- ChemSpider: 31104907
- UNII: O12H7VFU6P
- ChEMBL: ChEMBL3139186

Chemical and physical data
- Formula: C_{22}H_{27}ClN_{6}O
- Molar mass: 426.95 g·mol^{−1}
- 3D model (JSmol): Interactive image
- SMILES: CC1=NC2=C(C(=N1)N3CCN(CC3)C)N=C(N2C4CCOCC4)C5=CC=CC=C5Cl
- InChI: InChI=1S/C22H27ClN6O/c1-15-24-21(28-11-9-27(2)10-12-28)19-22(25-15)29(16-7-13-30-14-8-16)20(26-19)17-5-3-4-6-18(17)23/h3-6,16H,7-14H2,1-2H3; Key:UCMNDPDJRSEZPL-UHFFFAOYSA-N

LY2828360 is a drug which acts as a potent, selective and long acting agonist of the cannabinoid CB_{2} receptor. It was effective against neuropathic pain and allodynia in animal models, but was unsuccessful in human clinical trials against arthritis pain.
