= AM-2232 =

Cannabinoid receptor agonist

Legal status
- Legal status: CA: Schedule II; DE: Anlage II (Authorized trade only, not prescriptible); NZ: Temporary Class; UK: Class B; US: Schedule I

Identifiers
- IUPAC name: 5-(3-(1-Naphthoyl)-1H-indol-1-yl)pentanenitrile
- CAS Number: 335161-19-8
- ChemSpider: 26633898
- UNII: 40KCH8YIKP
- CompTox Dashboard (EPA): DTXSID90187157

Chemical and physical data
- Formula: C_{24}H_{20}N_{2}O
- Molar mass: 352.437 g·mol^{−1}
- 3D model (JSmol): Interactive image
- SMILES: c1ccc2c(c1)cccc2C(=O)c3cn(c4c3cccc4)CCCCC#N
- InChI: InChI=1S/C24H20N2O/c25-15-6-1-7-16-26-17-22(20-12-4-5-14-23(20)26)24(27)21-13-8-10-18-9-2-3-11-19(18)21/h2-5,8-14,17H,1,6-7,16H2; Key:VWVAIBKHFCUSMD-UHFFFAOYSA-N

AM-2232 (1-(4-cyanobutyl)-3-(naphthalen-1-oyl)indole) is a drug that acts as a potent but unselective agonist for the cannabinoid receptors, with a K_{i} of 0.28 nM at CB_{1} and 1.48 nM at CB_{2}.

In the United States, all CB_{1} receptor agonists of the 3-(1-naphthoyl)indole class such as AM-2232 are Schedule I Controlled Substances.

== See also ==
- AM-694
- AM-1235
- AM-2233
- FUBIMINA
- JWH-018
- List of AM cannabinoids
- List of JWH cannabinoids
- O-774
- O-1057
- O-1812
- THJ-2201
