= Methoxyestrone =

Methoxyestrone may refer to:

- 2-Methoxyestrone
- 3-Methoxyestrone
- 4-Methoxyestrone
