= O-2372 =

Chemical compound

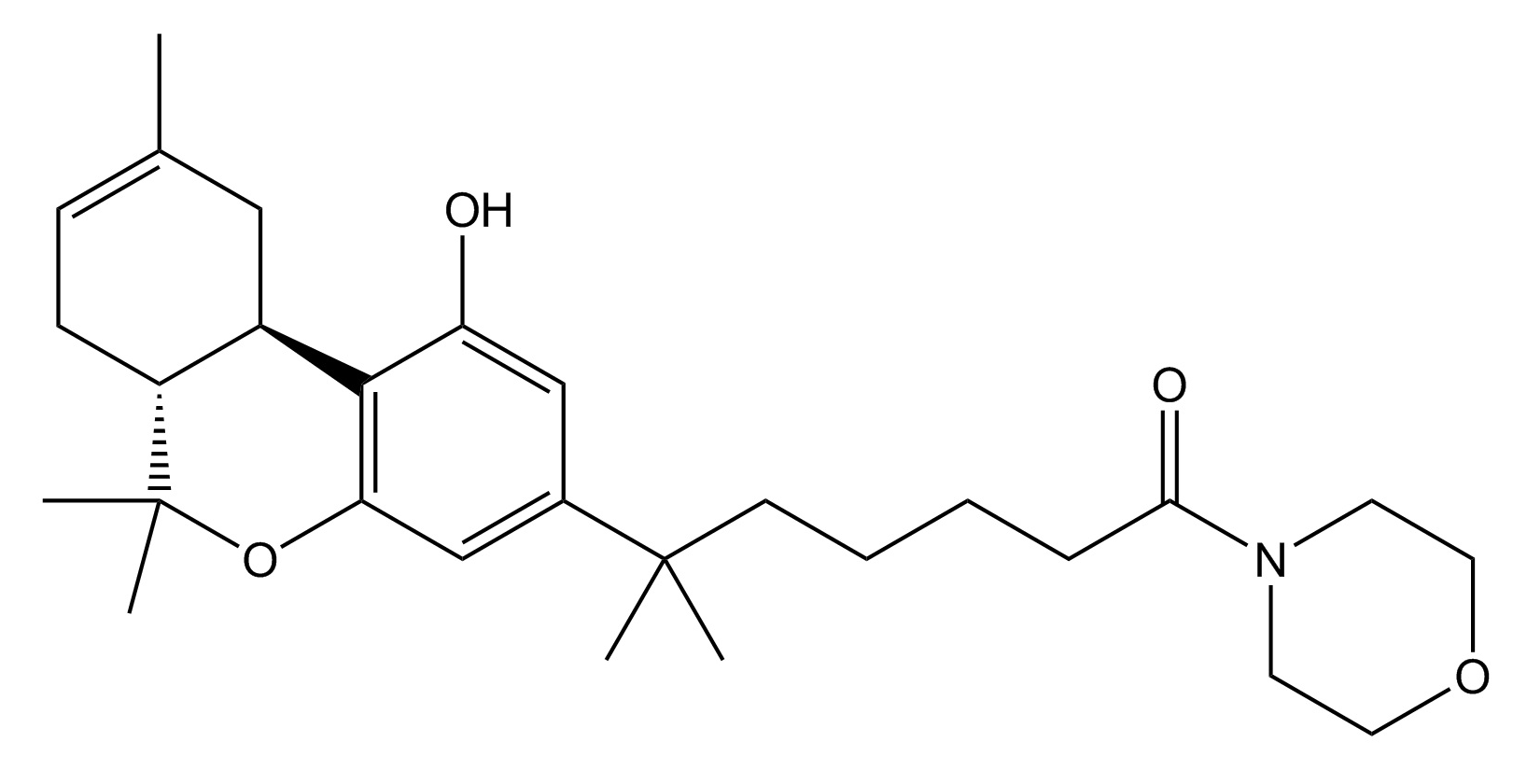

Identifiers
- IUPAC name: 6-((6aR,10aR)-1-hydroxy-6,6,9-trimethyl-6a,7,10,10a-tetrahydro-6H-benzo[c]chromen-3-yl)-6-methyl-1-morpholinoheptan-1-one
- CAS Number: 874631-37-5
- PubChem CID: 24848987
- ChemSpider: 21259336
- UNII: 26A5UES5ZR
- CompTox Dashboard (EPA): DTXSID901029739

Chemical and physical data
- Formula: C_{28}H_{41}NO_{4}
- Molar mass: 455.639 g·mol^{−1}
- 3D model (JSmol): Interactive image
- SMILES: CC1(C)[C@H]2[C@@H](CC(C)=CC2)C3=C(C=C(C(C)(C)CCCCC(N4CCOCC4)=O)C=C3O)O1
- InChI: InChI=1S/C28H41NO4/c1-19-9-10-22-21(16-19)26-23(30)17-20(18-24(26)33-28(22,4)5)27(2,3)11-7-6-8-25(31)29-12-14-32-15-13-29/h9,17-18,21-22,30H,6-8,10-16H2,1-5H3/t21-,22-/m1/s1; Key:ASKNFEPPYVJXIA-FGZHOGPDSA-N

O-2372 is an analgesic cannabinoid derivative created by Organix Inc. for use in scientific research. It has high affinity for both CB_{1} and CB_{2} receptors, with K_{i} values of 1.3 nM at CB_{1} and 0.57 nM at CB_{2}, but is only moderately soluble in water compared to other related compounds such as O-2694, which it is a metabolite of.

== See also ==
- O-2113
- O-2545
- O-2694
