= 5F-EMB-PINACA =

Chemical compound

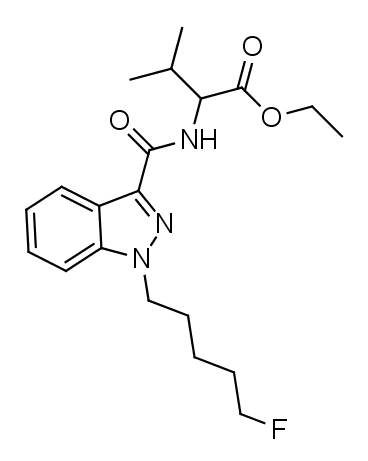

Legal status
- Legal status: CA: Schedule II; DE: NpSG (Industrial and scientific use only); UK: Class B

Identifiers
- IUPAC name: ethyl (1-(5-fluoropentyl)-1H-indazole-3-carbonyl)-L-valinate
- CAS Number: None
- ChemSpider: 58191441
- UNII: 64OSW0N4YB

Chemical and physical data
- Formula: C_{20}H_{28}FN_{3}O_{3}
- Molar mass: 377.460 g·mol^{−1}
- 3D model (JSmol): Interactive image
- SMILES: O=C(N[C@H](C(OCC)=O)C(C)C)C1=NN(CCCCCF)C2=CC=CC=C21
- InChI: InChI=1S/C20H28FN3O3/c1-4-27-20(26)17(14(2)3)22-19(25)18-15-10-6-7-11-16(15)24(23-18)13-9-5-8-12-21/h6-7,10-11,14,17H,4-5,8-9,12-13H2,1-3H3,(H,22,25)/t17-/m0/s1; Key:YWSYUMWEKPNAHT-KRWDZBQOSA-N

5F-EMB-PINACA (also known as EMB-5F-PINACA according to the EMCCDA framework for naming synthetic cannabinoids and 5F-AEB) is an indazole-based synthetic cannabinoid from the indazole-3-carboxamide family that has been sold online as a designer drug.

It was first reported by the EMCDDA as part of a seizure of 149 grams of white powder in Sweden in April 2015.

== Legal status ==
5F-EMB-PINACA is illegal in Sweden as of 26. January 2016.

== See also ==
- 5F-AB-PINACA
- 5F-ADB
- 5F-AMB
- 5F-APINACA
- AB-CHMINACA
- AB-FUBINACA
- AB-CHFUPYCA
- AB-PINACA
- ADB-CHMINACA
- ADB-FUBINACA
- ADB-PINACA
- AMB-FUBINACA
- APINACA
- MDMB-FUBINACA
- MDMB-CHMINACA
- PX-2
- PX-3
