= O-774 =

Chemical compound

Identifiers
- IUPAC name: 7-[(6aR,10aR)-1-hydroxy-6,6,9-trimethyl-6a,7,10,10a-tetrahydrobenzo[c]chromen-3-yl]-7-methyloctanenitrile
- CAS Number: 336104-74-6
- PubChem CID: 10833730
- ChemSpider: 9009030
- UNII: 77GNH26GH3
- ChEMBL: ChEMBL138917

Chemical and physical data
- Formula: C_{25}H_{35}NO_{2}
- Molar mass: 381.560 g·mol^{−1}
- 3D model (JSmol): Interactive image
- SMILES: N#CCCCCCC(c2cc1OC([C@@H]3C/C=C(\C[C@H]3c1c(O)c2)C)(C)C)(C)C
- InChI: InChI=1S/C25H35NO2/c1-17-10-11-20-19(14-17)23-21(27)15-18(16-22(23)28-25(20,4)5)24(2,3)12-8-6-7-9-13-26/h10,15-16,19-20,27H,6-9,11-12,14H2,1-5H3/t19-,20-/m1/s1; Key:RVTLXKSJDYALPU-WOJBJXKFSA-N

O-774 is a classical cannabinoid derivative which acts as a potent agonist for the cannabinoid receptors, with a K_{i} of 0.6 nM at CB_{1}, and very potent cannabinoid effects in animal studies.

== See also ==
- AM-2232
- O-1057
- O-1812
