= PipISB =

Chemical compound

Identifiers
- IUPAC name: N-(4-fluorobenzyl)-4-(3-(piperidin-1-ylindole-1-sulfonyl)benzamide
- CAS Number: 859165-19-8
- PubChem CID: 58975213
- ChemSpider: 65322455
- CompTox Dashboard (EPA): DTXSID101045311

Chemical and physical data
- Formula: C_{27}H_{26}FN_{3}O_{3}S
- Molar mass: 491.58 g·mol^{−1}
- 3D model (JSmol): Interactive image
- SMILES: O=S(N1C2=CC=CC=C2C(N3CCCCC3)=C1)(C4=CC=C(C(NCC5=CC=C(F)C=C5)=O)C=C4)=O
- InChI: InChI=1S/C27H26FN3O3S/c28-22-12-8-20(9-13-22)18-29-27(32)21-10-14-23(15-11-21)35(33,34)31-19-26(30-16-4-1-5-17-30)24-6-2-3-7-25(24)31/h2-3,6-15,19H,1,4-5,16-18H2,(H,29,32); Key:RXTQWWFLLRSBCM-UHFFFAOYSA-N

PipISB is a drug used in scientific research which acts as a potent and selective inverse agonist of the cannabinoid receptor CB_{1}. It is highly selective for the CB_{1} receptor over CB_{2}, with a K_{d} at CB_{1} of 1.5 nM vs over 7000 nM at CB_{2}, has good blood–brain barrier penetration, and can be conveniently radiolabelled with either ^{11}C or ^{18}F, making it useful for mapping the distribution of CB_{1} receptors in the brain.
