= Rosonabant =

Chemical compound

Clinical data
- ATC code: None

Identifiers
- IUPAC name: (±)-5-(4-chlorophenyl)-1-(2,4-dichlorophenyl)-N-(1-piperidinyl)-4,5-dihydro-1H-pyrazole-3-carboxamide
- CAS Number: 861151-12-4
- PubChem CID: 11316914
- ChemSpider: 9491881
- UNII: 7X5RY2T485
- CompTox Dashboard (EPA): DTXSID201006613

Chemical and physical data
- Formula: C_{21}H_{21}Cl_{3}N_{4}O
- Molar mass: 451.78 g·mol^{−1}
- 3D model (JSmol): Interactive image
- SMILES: O=C(NN1CCCCC1)\C4=N\N(c2ccc(Cl)cc2Cl)C(c3ccc(Cl)cc3)C4
- InChI: InChI=1S/C21H21Cl3N4O/c22-15-6-4-14(5-7-15)20-13-18(21(29)26-27-10-2-1-3-11-27)25-28(20)19-9-8-16(23)12-17(19)24/h4-9,12,20H,1-3,10-11,13H2,(H,26,29); Key:WMMMJGKFKKBRQR-UHFFFAOYSA-N

Rosonabant (INN; E-6776) is a drug acting as a CB_{1} receptor antagonist/inverse agonist that was under investigation by Esteve as an appetite suppressant for the treatment of obesity. Development of the drug for clinical use was apparently halted shortly after the related CB_{1} antagonist rimonabant was discovered to have serious adverse effects such as anxiety, clinical depression, and suicidal ideation.

== See also ==
- Cannabinoid receptor antagonist
