= BAY 59-3074 =

Chemical compound

Legal status
- Legal status: In general: unscheduled

Identifiers
- IUPAC name: 3-[2-Cyano-3-(trifluoromethyl)phenoxy]phenyl 4,4,4-trifluoro-1-butanesulfonic acid ester
- CAS Number: 406205-74-1
- PubChem CID: 10479060
- ChemSpider: 8654468
- UNII: 5FO5Z101GU
- CompTox Dashboard (EPA): DTXSID701027444

Chemical and physical data
- Formula: C_{18}H_{13}F_{6}NO_{4}S
- Molar mass: 453.36 g·mol^{−1}
- 3D model (JSmol): Interactive image
- SMILES: FC(F)(F)CCCS(=O)(=O)Oc2cc(Oc1cccc(c1C#N)C(F)(F)F)ccc2
- InChI: InChI=1S/C18H13F6NO4S/c19-17(20,21)8-3-9-30(26,27)29-13-5-1-4-12(10-13)28-16-7-2-6-15(14(16)11-25)18(22,23)24/h1-2,4-7,10H,3,8-9H2; Key:LWUSZIVDPJPVBW-UHFFFAOYSA-N

BAY 59-3074 is a drug which is a cannabinoid receptor partial agonist developed by Bayer AG. It has analgesic effects and is used in scientific research. It is orally active in animals, and has modest affinity for both CB_{1} and CB_{2} receptors, with K_{i} values of 48.3nM at CB_{1} and 45.5nM at CB_{2}.
