= O-2113 =

Chemical compound

Identifiers
- IUPAC name: (6aR,10aR)-3-(1-Ethanesulfonylamino-5-methyl-hexan-5-yl)-6a,7,10,10a-tetrahydro-6,6,9-trimethyl-6H-dibenzo[b,d]pyran
- CAS Number: 3038824-86-8
- PubChem CID: 11775273
- ChemSpider: 26333261
- CompTox Dashboard (EPA): DTXSID501030081

Chemical and physical data
- Formula: C_{25}H_{39}NO_{4}S
- Molar mass: 449.65 g·mol^{−1}
- 3D model (JSmol): Interactive image
- SMILES: C13CC=C(C)CC3c2c(OC1(C)C)cc(C(C)(C)CCCCNS(=O)(=O)CC)cc2O
- InChI: InChI=1S/C25H39NO4S/c1-7-31(28,29)26-13-9-8-12-24(3,4)18-15-21(27)23-19-14-17(2)10-11-20(19)25(5,6)30-22(23)16-18/h10,15-16,19-20,26-27H,7-9,11-14H2,1-6H3/t19-,20-/m1/s1; Key:UMJJTCXPFDHKGJ-WOJBJXKFSA-N

O-2113 is a drug that is a classical cannabinoid derivative, which acts as a potent agonist for cannabinoid receptors, producing sedation, hypothermia and analgesia in animal studies.

== See also ==
- O-2050
- O-2372
- O-2545
