= MK-9470 =

- [18F]-MK-9470

Names
- Preferred IUPAC name N-[(2S,3S)-3-(3-Cyanophenyl)-4-[4-(2-fluoroethoxy)phenyl]butan-2-yl]-2-methyl-2-(5-methylpyridin-2-yl)oxypropanamide

Identifiers
CAS Number	947371-30-4; [18F]: 945850-36-2
3D model (JSmol)	Interactive image; [18F]: Interactive image
ChemSpider	9342440
PubChem CID	11488705; [18F]: 11167344
UNII	3XCL8256SA; [18F]: GB3CX2BG84
CompTox Dashboard (EPA)	DTXSID00241592
- InChI: InChI=1S/C29H32FN3O3/c1-20-8-13-27(32-19-20)36-29(3,4)28(34)33-21(2)26(24-7-5-6-23(16-24)18-31)17-22-9-11-25(12-10-22)35-15-14-30/h5-13,16,19,21,26H,14-15,17H2,1-4H3,(H,33,34)/t21-,26+/m0/s1 Key: JWBGLSNXGRDLKH-HFZDXXHNBD; [18F]: InChI=1S/C29H32FN3O3/c1-20-8-13-27(32-19-20)36-29(3,4)28(34)33-21(2)26(24-7-5-6-23(16-24)18-31)17-22-9-11-25(12-10-22)35-15-14-30/h5-13,16,19,21,26H,14-15,17H2,1-4H3,(H,33,34)/t21-,26+/m0/s1/i30-1 Key: XIYPJXKEMLKFMD-MSNFMOCCSA-N
- SMILES: CC1=CN=C(C=C1)OC(C)(C)C(=O)N[C@@H](C)[C@@H](CC2=CC=C(C=C2)OCCF)C3=CC=CC(=C3)C#N; [18F]: [C@@H](CC1=CC=C(OCC[18F])C=C1)([C@@H](NC(C(OC2=CC=C(C)C=N2)(C)C)=O)C)C3=CC(C#N)=CC=C3

Properties
Chemical formula	C_{29}H_{32}FN_{3}O_{3}
Molar mass	489.591 g·mol^{−1}
- Except where otherwise noted, data are given for materials in their standard state (at 25 °C [77 °F], 100 kPa). verify (what is ?) Infobox references

MK-9470 is a synthetic compound which binds to the CB_{1} cannabinoid receptor and functions as an inverse agonist. The ^{18}F-labeled version, [18F]-MK-9470, is used in research as a positron emission tomography (PET) tracer for brain imaging of the CB_{1} receptor.
