= O-806 =

Chemical compound

Identifiers
- IUPAC name: (6aR)-3-(6-bromohex-2-ynyl)-6,6,9-trimethyl-6a,7,10,10a-tetrahydrobenzo[c]chromen-1-ol
- CAS Number: 229029-98-5
- PubChem CID: 10549140
- ChemSpider: 26001356
- CompTox Dashboard (EPA): DTXSID101027484

Chemical and physical data
- Formula: C_{22}H_{27}BrO_{2}
- Molar mass: 403.360 g·mol^{−1}
- 3D model (JSmol): Interactive image
- SMILES: C3C1C(CC=C3C)C(C)(C)Oc(c2)c1c(O)cc2CC#CCCCBr
- InChI: InChI=1S/C22H27BrO2/c1-15-9-10-18-17(12-15)21-19(24)13-16(8-6-4-5-7-11-23)14-20(21)25-22(18,2)3/h9,13-14,17-18,24H,5,7-8,10-12H2,1-3H3/t17-,18-/m1/s1; Key:QHFROVGTWNPDOW-QZTJIDSGSA-N

O-806 is a drug which is a cannabinoid derivative that is used in scientific research. It is described as a mixed agonist/antagonist at the cannabinoid receptor CB_{1}, meaning that it acts as an antagonist when co-administered alongside a more potent CB_{1} agonist, but exhibits weak partial agonist effects when administered by itself.
