= LY-320,135 =

Chemical compound

Identifiers
- IUPAC name: 4-[6-methoxy-2-(4-methoxyphenyl)1-benzofuran-3-carbonyl]benzonitrile
- CAS Number: 176977-56-3
- PubChem CID: 5311257
- IUPHAR/BPS: 742
- ChemSpider: 4470772
- UNII: CJY03984CT
- ChEMBL: ChEMBL411481
- CompTox Dashboard (EPA): DTXSID901027464
- ECHA InfoCard: 100.190.302

Chemical and physical data
- Formula: C_{24}H_{17}NO_{4}
- Molar mass: 383.403 g·mol^{−1}
- 3D model (JSmol): Interactive image
- SMILES: c3cc(OC)ccc3-c2oc1cc(OC)ccc1c2C(=O)c4ccc(C#N)cc4
- InChI: InChI=1S/C24H17NO4/c1-27-18-9-7-17(8-10-18)24-22(20-12-11-19(28-2)13-21(20)29-24)23(26)16-5-3-15(14-25)4-6-16/h3-13H,1-2H3; Key:RYNSGDFWBJWWSZ-UHFFFAOYSA-N

LY-320,135 is a drug used in scientific research which acts as a selective antagonist of the cannabinoid receptor CB_{1}. It was developed by Eli Lilly and Company in the 1990s.

LY-320,135 displays fairly good selectivity, with a binding affinity for CB_{1} around 70x stronger than for CB_{2}, but both its potency and selectivity are modest compared to newer agents, and at higher doses it also binds to a range of non-cannabinoid receptors. However LY-320,135 is still fairly widely used in research, particularly for elucidating the mechanisms by which many CB_{1} antagonists act as inverse agonists at higher doses.
