= AM-906 =

Chemical compound

Identifiers
- IUPAC name: (6aR,9R,10aR)-3-[(Z)-hept-1-enyl]-9-(hydroxymethyl)-6,6-dimethyl-6a,7,8,9,10,10a-hexahydrobenzo[c]chromen-1-ol
- CAS Number: 180989-26-8
- PubChem CID: 10089808
- ChemSpider: 8174103
- UNII: EW1UQ3B1Y8
- ChEMBL: ChEMBL127848
- CompTox Dashboard (EPA): DTXSID701027470

Chemical and physical data
- Formula: C_{23}H_{34}O_{3}
- Molar mass: 358.522 g·mol^{−1}
- 3D model (JSmol): Interactive image
- SMILES: CCCCC/C=C\C1=CC2=C(C3CC(CCC3C(O2)(C)C)CO)C(=C1)O
- InChI: InChI=1S/C23H34O3/c1-4-5-6-7-8-9-16-13-20(25)22-18-12-17(15-24)10-11-19(18)23(2,3)26-21(22)14-16/h8-9,13-14,17-19,24-25H,4-7,10-12,15H2,1-3H3/b9-8-/t17-,18-,19-/m1/s1; Key:NJIKRWBGUIYKJM-FORFBYLSSA-N

AM-906 (part of the AM cannabinoid series) is an analgesic drug which is a cannabinoid agonist. It is conformationally restricted by virtue of the double bond on its side chain, leading an increased affinity for and selectivity between CB_{1} and CB_{2} receptors. It is a potent and selective agonist for the CB_{1} cannabinoid receptor, with a K_{i} of 0.8 nM at CB_{1} and 9.5 nM at CB_{2}, a selectivity of almost 12x.

The corresponding E or trans isomer is AM-905.

== See also ==
- AM-1235
- AM-2389
