= Naboctate =

Chemical compound

Identifiers
- IUPAC name: (6,6,9-trimethyl-3-nonan-2-yl-7,8,9,10-tetrahydrobenzo[c]chromen-1-yl) 4-(diethylamino)butanoate
- CAS Number: 74912-19-9
- PubChem CID: 52339
- ChemSpider: 47328
- UNII: N6YFU80HRG
- CompTox Dashboard (EPA): DTXSID90994626

Chemical and physical data
- Formula: C_{33}H_{53}NO_{3}
- Molar mass: 511.791 g·mol^{−1}
- 3D model (JSmol): Interactive image
- SMILES: CCCCCCCC(C)C1=CC2=C(C3=C(CCC(C3)C)C(O2)(C)C)C(=C1)OC(=O)CCCN(CC)CC
- InChI: InChI=1S/C33H53NO3/c1-8-11-12-13-14-16-25(5)26-22-29(36-31(35)17-15-20-34(9-2)10-3)32-27-21-24(4)18-19-28(27)33(6,7)37-30(32)23-26/h22-25H,8-21H2,1-7H3; Key:UDQAWRWPAGUCRX-UHFFFAOYSA-N

Naboctate (SP-325) is a synthetic cannabinoid receptor agonist, which has antiemetic, sedative, anxiolytic and anti-glaucoma properties.
