= AM-1235 =

Chemical compound

Legal status
- Legal status: CA: Schedule II; DE: NpSG (Industrial and scientific use only); UK: Under Psychoactive Substances Act; US: Schedule I

Identifiers
- IUPAC name: 1-[(5-Fluoropentyl)-6-nitro-1H-indol-3-yl]-(naphthalen-1-yl)methanone
- CAS Number: 335161-27-8
- ChemSpider: 26633899
- UNII: 2HV9AH611M
- CompTox Dashboard (EPA): DTXSID10187159

Chemical and physical data
- Formula: C_{24}H_{21}FN_{2}O_{3}
- Molar mass: 404.441 g·mol^{−1}
- 3D model (JSmol): Interactive image
- SMILES: c24ccccc2cccc4C(=O)c(c3)c1ccc([N](=O)=O)cc1n3CCCCCF
- InChI: InChI=1S/C24H21FN2O3/c25-13-4-1-5-14-26-16-22(20-12-11-18(27(29)30)15-23(20)26)24(28)21-10-6-8-17-7-2-3-9-19(17)21/h2-3,6-12,15-16H,1,4-5,13-14H2; Key:LNGVQORPSNNMSZ-UHFFFAOYSA-N

AM-1235 (1-(5-fluoropentyl)-3-(naphthalen-1-oyl)-6-nitroindole) is a drug that acts as a potent and reasonably selective agonist for the cannabinoid receptor CB_{1}.

== Pharmacology ==
=== Pharmacodynamics ===
AM-1235 is a cannabinoid receptor agonist with K_{i} of 1.5 nM at CB_{1} compared to 20.4 nM at CB_{2}. While the 6-nitro substitution on the indole ring reduces affinity for both CB_{1} and CB_{2} relative to the unsubstituted parent compound AM-2201, CB_{2} affinity is reduced much more, resulting in a CB_{1} selectivity of around 13 times. This is in contrast to other related compounds such as AM-1221 where a 6-nitro substitution instead confers significant selectivity for CB_{2}.

=== Pharmacokinetics ===
AM-1235 metabolism differs only slightly from that of JWH-018. AM-1235 N-dealkylation produces 1-fluoropentane instead of pentane or other simple alkanes in general. It had been speculated that the fluoropentane might function as an alkylating agent or be further metabolized into toxic fluoroacetic acid. This is not true, however, as fluoroalkanes do not act as alkylating agents under normal conditions and odd-length fluoroalkane chains metabolize into substantially less toxic fluoropropanoic acid.

== Legal status ==
In the United States, all CB_{1} receptor agonists of the 3-(1-naphthoyl)indole class such as AM-1235 are Schedule I Controlled Substances.

== See also ==
- AM-694
- AM-906
- AM-2232
- AM-2233
- AM-2389
- JWH-018
- List of AM cannabinoids
- List of JWH cannabinoids
- O-1812
- THJ-2201
