= O-1812 =

Chemical compound

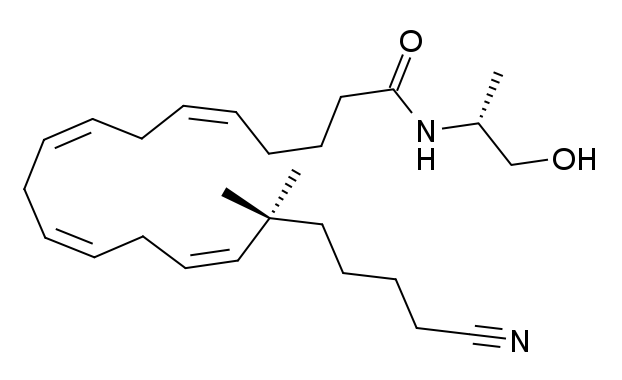

Identifiers
- IUPAC name: (5Z,8Z,11Z,14Z)-20-cyano-N-[(2R)-1-hydroxypropan-2-yl]-16,16-dimethylicosa-5,8,11,14-tetraenamide
- CAS Number: 342882-77-3
- PubChem CID: 9823107
- IUPHAR/BPS: 732
- ChemSpider: 7998855
- UNII: 5766D7AFA7
- CompTox Dashboard (EPA): DTXSID80745442

Chemical and physical data
- Formula: C_{26}H_{42}N_{2}O_{2}
- Molar mass: 414.634 g·mol^{−1}
- 3D model (JSmol): Interactive image
- SMILES: C[C@H](CO)NC(=O)CCC/C=C\C/C=C\C/C=C\C/C=C\C(C)(C)CCCCC#N
- InChI: InChI=1S/C26H42N2O2/c1-24(23-29)28-25(30)19-15-12-10-8-6-4-5-7-9-11-13-16-20-26(2,3)21-17-14-18-22-27/h4-5,8-11,16,20,24,29H,6-7,12-15,17-19,21,23H2,1-3H3,(H,28,30)/b5-4-,10-8-,11-9-,20-16-/t24-/m1/s1; Key:WZQHSBKOWZOASP-QLZKPENWSA-N

O-1812 is an eicosanoid derivative related to anandamide that acts as a potent and highly selective agonist for the cannabinoid receptor CB_{1}, with a K_{i} of 3.4 nM at CB_{1} and 3870 nM at CB_{2}. Unlike most related compounds, O-1812 is metabolically stable against rapid breakdown by enzymes, and produces a cannabinoid-like discriminative effect in rats, which is similar but not identical to that produced by cannabinoid drugs of other chemical classes.

== See also ==
- AM-1235
- AM-2232
- AM-2389
- Methanandamide
- O-774
- O-1057
