= AM-411 =

Chemical compound

Identifiers
- IUPAC name: (6aR,10aR)-3-(1-Adamantyl)-6,6,9-trimethyl-6a,7,10,10a-tetrahydrobenzo[c]chromen-1-ol
- CAS Number: 212835-02-4
- PubChem CID: 9799945
- ChemSpider: 7975710
- UNII: 2K9WS7SUR3
- ChEMBL: ChEMBL434351

Chemical and physical data
- Formula: C_{26}H_{34}O_{2}
- Molar mass: 378.556 g·mol^{−1}
- 3D model (JSmol): Interactive image
- SMILES: C5C6CC4CC5(CC(C6)C4)c(cc1O3)cc(O)c1C2CC(C)=CCC2C3(C)C
- InChI: InChI=1S/C26H34O2/c1-15-4-5-21-20(6-15)24-22(27)10-19(11-23(24)28-25(21,2)3)26-12-16-7-17(13-26)9-18(8-16)14-26/h4,10-11,16-18,20-21,27H,5-9,12-14H2,1-3H3/t16?,17?,18?,20-,21-,26?/m1/s1; Key:RPBMPWGKZFLMFN-OKFSJJLXSA-N

AM-411 (part of the AM cannabinoid series) is an analgesic drug that is a cannabinoid agonist. It is a derivative of Δ8-THC substituted with an adamantyl group at the 3-position, demonstrating that the binding pocket for the alkyl chain at this position can accommodate significant bulk.

AM-411 is a potent and fairly selective CB_{1} full agonist with a K_{i} of 6.80 nM, but is still also a moderately potent CB_{2} agonist with a K_{i} of 52.0 nM. It produces similar effects to other cannabinoid agonists such as analgesia, sedation, and anxiolysis.

== See also ==
- Adamantyl-HHC
- AM-087
- AM-1248
- KM-233
