= AM-087 =

Chemical compound

Identifiers
- IUPAC name: (6aR,10aR)-3-(2-Methyl-6-bromohex-2-yl)-6,6,9-trimethyl-6a,7,10,10a-tetrahydrobenzo[c]chromen-1-ol
- CAS Number: 152674-96-9
- PubChem CID: 10717065
- ChemSpider: 8892405
- UNII: B4C266FTR4
- ChEMBL: ChEMBL199561
- CompTox Dashboard (EPA): DTXSID301027466

Chemical and physical data
- Formula: C_{23}H_{33}BrO_{2}
- Molar mass: 421.419 g·mol^{−1}
- 3D model (JSmol): Interactive image
- SMILES: CC3(C)C1CC=C(C)CC1c2c(O)cc(C(C)(C)CCCCBr)cc2O3
- InChI: InChI=1S/C23H33BrO2/c1-15-8-9-18-17(12-15)21-19(25)13-16(14-20(21)26-23(18,4)5)22(2,3)10-6-7-11-24/h8,13-14,17-18,25H,6-7,9-12H2,1-5H3/t17-,18-/m1/s1; Key:RJPGJHLVEUSRRA-QZTJIDSGSA-N

AM-087 (part of the AM cannabinoid series) is an analgesic drug which acts as a cannabinoid agonist. It is a derivative of Δ8-THC, substituted on the 3-position side chain. AM-087 is a potent CB_{1} agonist with a Ki of 0.43 nM, making it around 100 times more potent than THC itself. This is most likely due to the bulky bromine substituent on the side chain.

== See also ==
- 1'-Dimethyl-Δ9-THCH
- AM-411
