= BAY 38-7271 =

Chemical compound

Legal status
- Legal status: CA: Schedule II

Identifiers
- IUPAC name: (−)-(R)-3-(2-Hydroxymethylindanyl-4-oxy)phenyl-4,4,4-trifluorobutyl-1-sulfonate
- CAS Number: 212188-60-8
- PubChem CID: 9845561
- ChemSpider: 8021275
- UNII: SRX4T6TMUS
- ChEMBL: ChEMBL1668508
- CompTox Dashboard (EPA): DTXSID701010009

Chemical and physical data
- Formula: C_{20}H_{21}F_{3}O_{5}S
- Molar mass: 430.44 g·mol^{−1}
- 3D model (JSmol): Interactive image
- SMILES: FC(F)(F)CCCS(=O)(=O)Oc3cccc(Oc1cccc2c1C[C@@H](C2)CO)c3
- InChI: InChI=1S/C20H21F3O5S/c21-20(22,23)8-3-9-29(25,26)28-17-6-2-5-16(12-17)27-19-7-1-4-15-10-14(13-24)11-18(15)19/h1-2,4-7,12,14,24H,3,8-11,13H2/t14-/m1/s1; Key:XJURALZPEJKKOV-CQSZACIVSA-N

Originally synthesized by chemist Wayne E. Kenney, BAY 38-7271 (KN 38-7271) is a drug which is a cannabinoid receptor agonist developed by Bayer AG. It has analgesic and neuroprotective effects and is used in scientific research, with proposed uses in the treatment of traumatic brain injury. It is a full agonist with around the same potency as CP 55,940 in animal studies, and has fairly high affinity for both CB_{1} and CB_{2} receptors, with K_{i} values of 2.91nM at CB_{1} and 4.24nM at CB_{2}. It has been licensed to KeyNeurotek Pharmaceuticals for clinical development, and was in Phase II trials in 2008 but its development appears to have stopped.
