= VCHSR =

Chemical compound

Identifiers
- IUPAC name: 5-(4-chlorophenyl)- 3-[(E)-2-cyclohexylethenyl]-1-(2,4-dichlorophenyl)-4-methyl-1H-pyrazole
- CAS Number: 913624-85-8
- PubChem CID: 66887337
- ChemSpider: 21378331
- ChEMBL: ChEMBL386832

Chemical and physical data
- Formula: C_{24}H_{23}Cl_{3}N_{2}
- Molar mass: 445.81 g·mol^{−1}
- 3D model (JSmol): Interactive image
- SMILES: C4CCCCC4C=Cc(c(C)c1-c(cc3)ccc3Cl)nn1-c2ccc(Cl)cc2Cl
- InChI: InChI=1S/C24H23Cl3N2/c1-16-22(13-7-17-5-3-2-4-6-17)28-29(23-14-12-20(26)15-21(23)27)24(16)18-8-10-19(25)11-9-18/h7-15,17H,2-6H2,1H3/b13-7+; Key:UMOLSRBHNLXWGD-NTUHNPAUSA-N

VCHSR is a drug used in scientific research which acts as a selective antagonist of the cannabinoid receptor CB_{1}. It is derived from the widely used CB_{1} antagonist rimonabant, and has similar potency and selectivity for the CB_{1} receptor, but has been modified to remove the hydrogen bonding capability in the C-3 substituent region, which removes the inverse agonist effect that rimonabant produces at high doses, so that VCHSR instead acts as a neutral antagonist, blocking the receptor but producing no physiological effect of its own.
