= L-759,633 =

Chemical compound

Identifiers
- IUPAC name: (6aR,10aR)-1-methoxy-6,6,9-trimethyl-3-(2-methyloctan-2-yl)-6a,7,10,10a-tetrahydrobenzo[c]chromene
- CAS Number: 174627-50-0
- PubChem CID: 5311215
- IUPHAR/BPS: 748
- ChemSpider: 4470734
- ChEBI: CHEBI:191050
- ChEMBL: ChEMBL57367

Chemical and physical data
- Formula: C_{26}H_{40}O_{2}
- Molar mass: 384.604 g·mol^{−1}
- 3D model (JSmol): Interactive image
- SMILES: CCCCCCC(C)(C)c1cc2c(c(c1)OC)[C@@H]3CC(=CC[C@H]3C(O2)(C)C)C
- InChI: InChI=1S/C26H40O2/c1-8-9-10-11-14-25(3,4)19-16-22(27-7)24-20-15-18(2)12-13-21(20)26(5,6)28-23(24)17-19/h12,16-17,20-21H,8-11,13-15H2,1-7H3/t20-,21-/m1/s1; Key:SUFMHSFGODDLKI-NHCUHLMSSA-N

L-759,633 is an analgesic drug that is a cannabinoid agonist. It is a fairly selective agonist for the CB_{2} receptor, with selectivity of 163x for CB_{2} over CB_{1}.

It produces some similar effects to other cannabinoid agonists such as analgesia, but with little or no sedative or psychoactive effects due to its weak CB_{1} activity, and a relatively strong antiinflammatory effect due to its strong activity at CB_{2}.

== See also ==
- Delta-8-THCM
- L-759,656
- L-768,242
