= LASSBio-881 =

Chemical compound

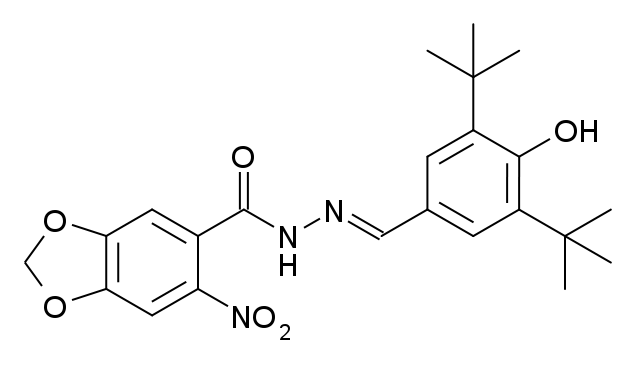

Identifiers
- IUPAC name: N'-[(3,5-ditert-butyl-4-oxocyclohexa-2,5-dien-1-ylidene)methyl]-6-nitro-1,3-benzodioxole-5-carbohydrazide
- CAS Number: 929563-84-8
- PubChem CID: 16721055
- ChemSpider: 23293401
- ChEMBL: ChEMBL234619

Chemical and physical data
- Formula: C_{23}H_{27}N_{3}O_{6}
- Molar mass: 441.484 g·mol^{−1}
- 3D model (JSmol): Interactive image
- SMILES: Oc1c(C(C)(C)C)cc(cc1C(C)(C)C)\C=N\NC(=O)c2cc3OCOc3cc2[N](=O)=O
- InChI: InChI=1S/C23H27N3O6/c1-22(2,3)15-7-13(8-16(20(15)27)23(4,5)6)11-24-25-21(28)14-9-18-19(32-12-31-18)10-17(14)26(29)30/h7-11,27H,12H2,1-6H3,(H,25,28)/b24-11+; Key:XEYZVZBNMMRXSN-BHGWPJFGSA-N

LASSBio-881 is a drug which acts as both a non-selective partial agonist of the CB_{1} and CB_{2} cannabinoid receptors, and also as an antagonist of the TRPV1 receptor, as well as having antioxidant effects. It has potent anti-inflammatory and anti-hyperalgesic effects in animal studies.

- LASSBio-945 has an identical structure sans the nitro FG.
