= O-1057 =

Analgesic cannabinoid derivative

Identifiers
- IUPAC name: 3-(5'-cyano-1',1'-dimethylpentyl)-1-(4-N-morpholinobutyryloxy)-Δ^{8}-tetrahydrocannabinol
- CAS Number: 216988-52-2
- PubChem CID: 9829239
- ChemSpider: 8004975
- UNII: 8Q53S9RF4H
- ChEMBL: ChEMBL1668516
- CompTox Dashboard (EPA): DTXSID401019171

Chemical and physical data
- Formula: C_{32}H_{46}N_{2}O_{4}
- Molar mass: 522.730 g·mol^{−1}
- 3D model (JSmol): Interactive image
- SMILES: N#CCCCCC(c3cc1OC([C@@H]4C/C=C(\CC4c1c(OC(=O)CCCN2CCOCC2)c3)C)(C)C)(C)C
- InChI: InChI=1S/C32H46N2O4/c1-23-11-12-26-25(20-23)30-27(37-29(35)10-9-15-34-16-18-36-19-17-34)21-24(22-28(30)38-32(26,4)5)31(2,3)13-7-6-8-14-33/h11,21-22,25-26H,6-10,12-13,15-20H2,1-5H3/t25-,26-/m1/s1; Key:YRDNBEPFVBMTNP-CLJLJLNGSA-N

O-1057 is an analgesic cannabinoid derivative created by Organix Inc., Newburyport, Massachusetts, for use in scientific research. Unlike most cannabinoids discovered to date, it is water-soluble, which gives it considerable advantages over many related cannabinoids. It has moderate affinity for both CB_{1} and CB_{2} receptors, with K_{i} values of 8.36 nM at CB_{1} and 7.95 nM at CB_{2}

== See also ==
- AM-2232
- O-774
- O-1812
- O-2694
- SP-111
