= AMB-CHMINACA =

Chemical compound

Legal status
- Legal status: CA: Schedule II; DE: NpSG (Industrial and scientific use only); UK: Class B

Identifiers
- IUPAC name: methyl (2S)-2-{[1-(cyclohexylmethyl)indazole-3-carbonyl]amino}-3-methylbutanoate
- CAS Number: 1863066-03-8(racemate)
- PubChem CID: 119026010
- ChemSpider: 32055578
- UNII: OU56JJP891; Y21A13WADY(racemate)
- CompTox Dashboard (EPA): DTXSID601344891

Chemical and physical data
- Formula: C_{21}H_{29}N_{3}O_{3}
- Molar mass: 371.481 g·mol^{−1}
- 3D model (JSmol): Interactive image
- SMILES: COC([C@H](C(C)C)NC(C1=NN(C2=C1C=CC=C2)CC3CCCCC3)=O)=O
- InChI: InChI=1S/C21H29N3O3/c1-14(2)18(21(26)27-3)22-20(25)19-16-11-7-8-12-17(16)24(23-19)13-15-9-5-4-6-10-15/h7-8,11-12,14-15,18H,4-6,9-10,13H2,1-3H3,(H,22,25)/t18-/m0/s1; Key:CRGGXDSTBHQLKJ-SFHVURJKSA-N

AMB-CHMINACA or MMB-CHMINACA (also known as MA-CHMINACA) is an indazole-based synthetic cannabinoid that is a potent agonist of the CB_{1} receptor and has been sold online as a designer drug.

== Legal status ==
AMB-CHMINACA is listed in the Fifth Schedule of the Misuse of Drugs Act (MDA) and therefore illegal in Singapore as of May 2015.

Sweden's public health agency classified AMB-CHMINACA as a narcotic substance, on January 18, 2019.

== See also ==
- 5F-AB-PINACA
- 5F-ADB
- 5F-AMB
- 5F-APINACA
- AB-CHFUPYCA
- AB-FUBINACA
- AB-PINACA
- ADB-CHMINACA
- ADB-FUBINACA
- ADB-PINACA
- ADSB-FUB-187
- AMB-FUBINACA
- APINACA
- MDMB-CHMICA
- MDMB-CHMINACA
- MDMB-FUBINACA
- PX-2
- PX-3
