= R1317 =

Clinical data
- Other names: 1-Cinnamyl-4-phenyl-4-piperidinol propionate; EA 2219

Identifiers
- IUPAC name: [4-phenyl-1-[(E)-3-phenylprop-2-enyl]piperidin-4-yl] propanoate
- CAS Number: 6849-00-9
- PubChem CID: 6444553
- ChemSpider: 4948442

Chemical and physical data
- Formula: C_{23}H_{27}NO_{2}
- Molar mass: 349.474 g·mol^{−1}
- 3D model (JSmol): Interactive image
- SMILES: CCC(=O)OC1(CCN(CC1)C/C=C/C2=CC=CC=C2)C3=CC=CC=C3
- InChI: InChI=1S/C23H27NO2/c1-2-22(25)26-23(21-13-7-4-8-14-21)15-18-24(19-16-23)17-9-12-20-10-5-3-6-11-20/h3-14H,2,15-19H2,1H3/b12-9+; Key:STWAFYHWLNRRHY-FMIVXFBMSA-N

R1317 is a desmethylprodine analog in which the N-methyl group is replaced by a cinnamyl group. This change in sidechain endows the compound with an increase in potency. The compound is 261 times more potent than meperidine in mice and 1100 times more potent in rats. In another article it was stated to be 785 times more potent than meperidine.

Despite this high potency, it is not the most potent 4-phenylpiperidine-reverse ester ever created. The most potent 4-phenylpiperidine-reverse ester ever created is R1480. R1480 is stated to have a potency 1500-3180 times higher than meperidine in mice and 3040 times higher in rats.

R1480

It was investigated as a candidate for a non-lethal incapacitating agent, but was discarded due to its high toxicity in primates. The substituted 2-nitrocinnamyl, EA 2475, is 282 times more potent (analgesic potency = 28000) and have a therapeutic index superior to remifentanil, in mices, but it is highly toxic and ineffective for primates.

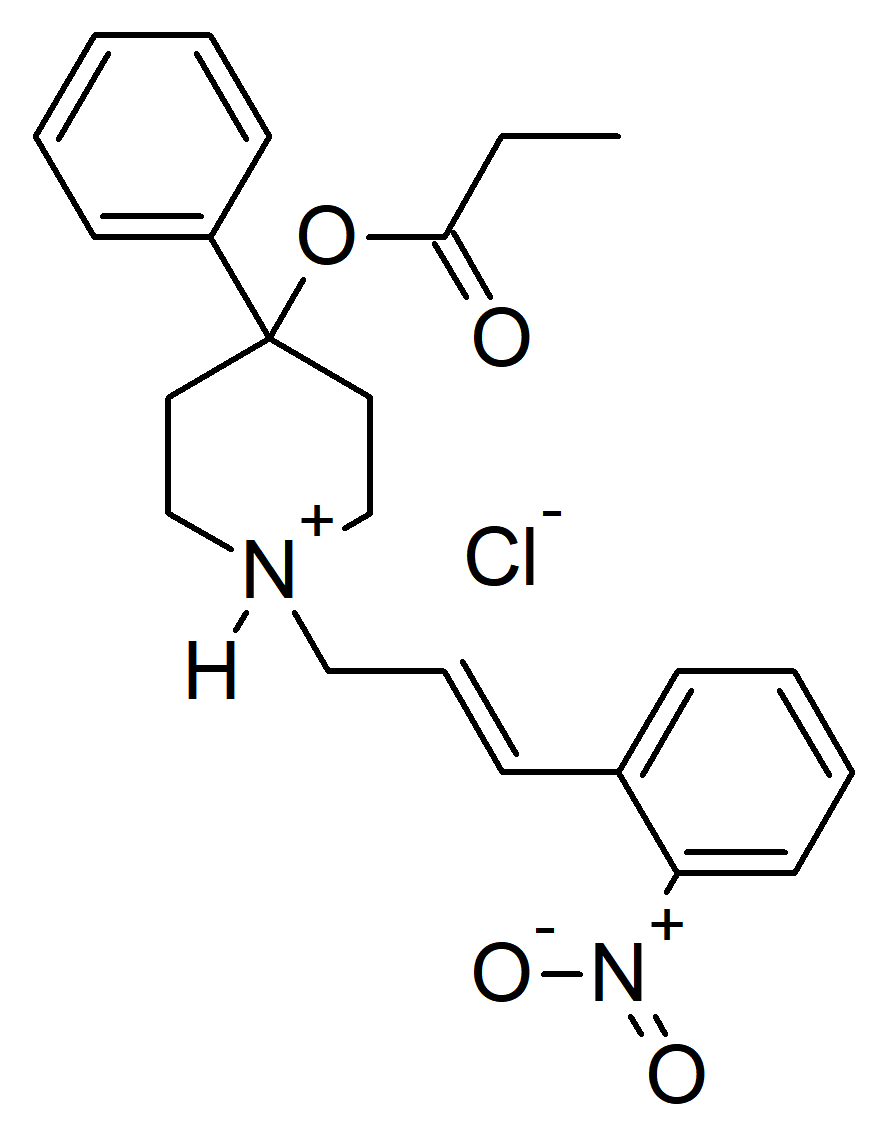
EA-2475 structure

None of these compounds were adopted as incapacitating agents, with the likely agent adopted being the EA 3382.
