= PF-514273 =

Chemical compound

Identifiers
- IUPAC name: 2-(2-chlorophenyl)-3-(4-chlorophenyl)-7-(2,2-difluoropropyl)-6,7-dihydro-2H-pyrazolo[3,4-f][1,4]oxazepin-8(5H)-one
- CAS Number: 851728-60-4
- PubChem CID: 11316919
- ChemSpider: 9491886
- UNII: 45FRJ4YGM2
- CompTox Dashboard (EPA): DTXSID80462142

Chemical and physical data
- Formula: C_{21}H_{17}Cl_{2}F_{2}N_{3}O_{2}
- Molar mass: 452.28 g·mol^{−1}
- 3D model (JSmol): Interactive image
- SMILES: O=C1N(CC(F)(C)F)CCOc2c1nn(c2-c(cc4)ccc4Cl)-c3ccccc3Cl
- InChI: InChI=1S/C21H17Cl2F2N3O2/c1-21(24,25)12-27-10-11-30-19-17(20(27)29)26-28(16-5-3-2-4-15(16)23)18(19)13-6-8-14(22)9-7-13/h2-9H,10-12H2,1H3; Key:FJMQJSUOOGOWBD-UHFFFAOYSA-N

PF-514273 is a drug developed by Pfizer, which acts as an extremely selective antagonist for the CB_{1} receptor, with approximately 10,000x selectivity over the closely related CB_{2} receptor. This very high selectivity makes it useful for scientific research into these receptors, as many commonly used cannabinoid receptor antagonists also block the CB_{2} receptor to some extent.
