= AMG-3 =

Chemical compound

Identifiers
- IUPAC name: (6aR,10aR)-3-(2-hexyl-1,3-dithiolan-2-yl)-6,6,9-trimethyl-6a,7,10,10a-tetrahydrobenzo[c]chromen-1-ol
- CAS Number: 179044-94-1
- PubChem CID: 10002952
- ChemSpider: 8178532
- UNII: U90K6D923K
- ChEMBL: ChEMBL476325
- CompTox Dashboard (EPA): DTXSID701019037

Chemical and physical data
- Formula: C_{25}H_{36}O_{2}S_{2}
- Molar mass: 432.68 g·mol^{−1}
- 3D model (JSmol): Interactive image
- SMILES: CCCCCCC4(SCCS4)c(cc1O)cc(OC(C)(C)C2CC=3)c1C2CC=3C
- InChI: InChI=1S/C25H36O2S2/c1-5-6-7-8-11-25(28-12-13-29-25)18-15-21(26)23-19-14-17(2)9-10-20(19)24(3,4)27-22(23)16-18/h9,15-16,19-20,26H,5-8,10-14H2,1-4H3/t19-,20-/m1/s1; Key:JECXXFXYJAQVAH-WOJBJXKFSA-N

AMG-3 (part of the AM cannabinoid series) is an analgesic drug which is a cannabinoid agonist. It is a derivative of Δ^{8}-THC substituted with a dithiolane group on the 3-position side chain. AMG-3 is a potent agonist at both CB_{1} and CB_{2} receptors with a K_{i} of 0.32 nM at CB_{1} and 0.52 nM at CB_{2}, and its particularly high binding affinity has led to it being used as a template for further structural development of novel cannabinoid drugs. It has sedative and analgesic effects, with analgesia lasting for up to 36 hours after administration.

== See also ==
- AMG-36
- AMG-41
