= JWH-424 =

Chemical compound

Legal status
- Legal status: CA: Schedule II; DE: NpSG (Industrial and scientific use only); UK: Class B; US: Schedule I

Identifiers
- IUPAC name: 1-Pentyl-3-(8-bromo-1-naphthoyl)indole
- CAS Number: 1366068-04-3
- PubChem CID: 57458937
- ChemSpider: 28645324
- UNII: O4Q3AIP6BJ
- CompTox Dashboard (EPA): DTXSID50159855

Chemical and physical data
- Formula: C_{24}H_{22}BrNO
- Molar mass: 420.350 g·mol^{−1}
- 3D model (JSmol): Interactive image
- SMILES: c4cccc1c4n(CCCCC)cc1C(=O)c(c2c3Br)cccc2ccc3
- InChI: InChI=1S/C24H22BrNO/c1-2-3-6-15-26-16-20(18-11-4-5-14-22(18)26)24(27)19-12-7-9-17-10-8-13-21(25)23(17)19/h4-5,7-14,16H,2-3,6,15H2,1H3; Key:QXZYVJRMQVOOEQ-UHFFFAOYSA-N

JWH-424 is a drug from the naphthoylindole family, which acts as a cannabinoid agonist at both the CB_{1} and CB_{2} receptors, but with moderate selectivity for CB_{2}, having a K_{i} of 5.44nM at CB_{2} vs 20.9 nM at CB_{1}. The heavier 8-iodo analogue is even more CB_{2} selective, with its 2-methyl derivative having 40 times selectivity for CB_{2}. However the 1-propyl homologues in this series showed much lower affinity at both receptors, reflecting a generally reduced affinity for the 8-substituted naphthoylindoles overall.

In the United States, all CB_{1} receptor agonists of the 3-(1-naphthoyl)indole class such as JWH-424 are Schedule I Controlled Substances.

== See also ==
- JWH-018
- JWH-398
