= O-2050 =

Chemical compound

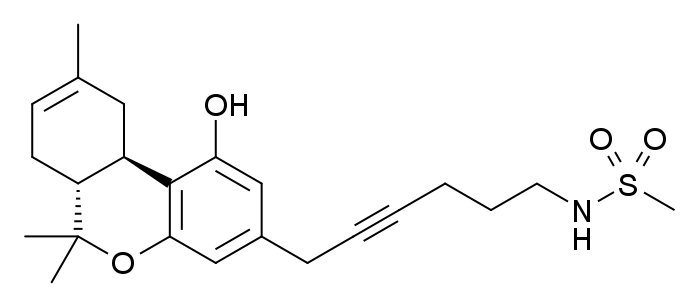

Identifiers
- IUPAC name: (6aR,10aR)-3-(1-Methanesulfonylamino-4-hexyn-6-yl)-6a,7,10,10a-tetrahydro-6,6,9-trimethyl-6H-dibenzo[b,d]pyran
- CAS Number: 667419-91-2
- PubChem CID: 16102146
- ChemSpider: 17260023
- CompTox Dashboard (EPA): DTXSID101030510

Chemical and physical data
- Formula: C_{23}H_{31}NO_{4}S
- Molar mass: 417.56 g·mol^{−1}
- 3D model (JSmol): Interactive image
- SMILES: CC1=CC[C@@H]2[C@@H](C1)c3c(cc(cc3OC2(C)C)CC#CCCCNS(=O)(=O)C)O
- InChI: InChI=1S/C23H31NO4S/c1-16-10-11-19-18(13-16)22-20(25)14-17(15-21(22)28-23(19,2)3)9-7-5-6-8-12-24-29(4,26)27/h10,14-15,18-19,24-25H,6,8-9,11-13H2,1-4H3/t18-,19-/m1/s1; Key:DJTGGIYZQHHLGJ-RTBURBONSA-N

O-2050 is a drug that is a classical cannabinoid derivative, which acts as an antagonist for the CB_{1} receptor. This gives it an advantage in research over many commonly used cannabinoid antagonists, such as rimonabant, which at higher doses act as inverse agonists at CB_{1} as well as showing off-target effects. However, while O-2050 acts as a silent antagonist in vitro, some tests in vivo have suggested it may show agonist activity under certain circumstances.

== See also ==
- O-2113
