= O-1238 =

Chemical compound

Identifiers
- IUPAC name: (6aR)-3-[(Z)-6-Azidohex-2-enyl]-6,6,9-trimethyl-6a,7,10,10a-tetrahydrobenzo[c]chromen-1-ol
- CAS Number: 229030-01-7
- PubChem CID: 10761489
- CompTox Dashboard (EPA): DTXSID501027486

Chemical and physical data
- Formula: C_{22}H_{29}N_{3}O_{2}
- Molar mass: 367.493 g·mol^{−1}
- 3D model (JSmol): Interactive image
- SMILES: CC3=CCC2C(C)(C)Oc(c1C2C3)cc(cc1O)CC=CCCCN=N=N
- InChI: InChI=1S/C22H29N3O2/c1-15-9-10-18-17(12-15)21-19(26)13-16(14-20(21)27-22(18,2)3)8-6-4-5-7-11-24-25-23/h4,6,9,13-14,17-18,26H,5,7-8,10-12H2,1-3H3/b6-4-/t17?,18-/m1/s1; Key:WCIOISWISHFTFW-UWFURQARSA-N

O-1238 is a drug which is a cannabinoid derivative that is used in scientific research. It is a partial agonist at the cannabinoid receptor CB_{1}, producing a maximal stimulation of 58.3% with a K_{i} of 8.45 nM.
