= Pirnabine =

Chemical compound

Identifiers
- IUPAC name: (3,6,6,9-Tetramethyl-7,8,9,10-tetrahydrobenzo[c]chromen-1-yl) acetate
- CAS Number: 19825-63-9
- PubChem CID: 50137
- ChemSpider: 45469
- UNII: S3FHL03F60
- CompTox Dashboard (EPA): DTXSID00867559

Chemical and physical data
- Formula: C_{19}H_{24}O_{3}
- Molar mass: 300.398 g·mol^{−1}
- 3D model (JSmol): Interactive image
- SMILES: O=C(C)Oc1cc(C)cc(OC2(C)C)c1C(C3)=C2CCC3C
- InChI: InChI=1S/C19H24O3/c1-11-6-7-15-14(8-11)18-16(21-13(3)20)9-12(2)10-17(18)22-19(15,4)5/h9-11H,6-8H2,1-5H3; Key:AADNQNOXNWEYHS-UHFFFAOYSA-N

Pirnabine (SP-304) is a synthetic cannabinoid receptor ligand, which was developed for the treatment of glaucoma.
