= JWH-198 =

Chemical compound

Legal status
- Legal status: CA: Schedule II; DE: NpSG (Industrial and scientific use only); UK: Class B; US: Schedule I

Identifiers
- IUPAC name: (1-(2-Morpholin-4-ylethyl)indol-3-yl)-4-methoxynaphthalen-1-ylmethanone
- CAS Number: 166599-76-4
- PubChem CID: 10319620
- ChemSpider: 8495084
- UNII: J53IGM38PB
- CompTox Dashboard (EPA): DTXSID40168133

Chemical and physical data
- Formula: C_{26}H_{26}N_{2}O_{3}
- Molar mass: 414.505 g·mol^{−1}
- 3D model (JSmol): Interactive image
- SMILES: C4COCCN4CCn2cc(c5ccccc25)C(=O)c3c1ccccc1c(OC)cc3
- InChI: InChI=1S/C26H26N2O3/c1-30-25-11-10-22(19-6-2-3-8-21(19)25)26(29)23-18-28(24-9-5-4-7-20(23)24)13-12-27-14-16-31-17-15-27/h2-11,18H,12-17H2,1H3; Key:QWHSUXWDDKWTOG-UHFFFAOYSA-N

JWH-198 is a drug from the aminoalkylindole and naphthoylindole families which acts as a cannabinoid receptor agonist. It was invented by the pharmaceutical company Sanofi-Winthrop in the early 1990s. JWH-198 has a binding affinity at the CB_{1} receptor of 10 nM, binding around four times more tightly than the parent compound JWH-200, which has no substitution on the naphthoyl ring. It has been used mainly in molecular modelling of the cannabinoid receptors.

In the United States, all CB_{1} receptor agonists of the 3-(1-naphthoyl)indole class such as JWH-198 are Schedule I Controlled Substances.

== See also ==
- JWH-081
- JWH-193
