= RTI-371 =

Chemical compound

Identifiers
- IUPAC name: 3-(4-Chlorophenyl)-5-[(1R,2S,3S,5S)-8-methyl-3-(4-methylphenyl)-8-azabicyclo[3.2.1]octan-2-yl]-1,2-oxazole
- CAS Number: 652978-45-5
- PubChem CID: 11474847
- UNII: YP3P4N7NQQ
- CompTox Dashboard (EPA): DTXSID801028807

Chemical and physical data
- Formula: C_{24}H_{25}ClN_{2}O
- Molar mass: 392.93 g·mol^{−1}
- 3D model (JSmol): Interactive image
- SMILES: CC1=CC=C(C=C1)[C@H]2C[C@@H]3CC[C@H]([C@H]2C4=CC(=NO4)C5=CC=C(C=C5)Cl)N3C

3β-(4-Methylphenyl)-2β-[3-(4-chlorophenyl)isoxazol-5-yl]tropane (RTI-4229-371) is a phenyltropane derived drug which acts as a potent and selective dopamine reuptake inhibitor in vitro, yet unusually for this class of compound, both RTI-371 and the closely related compound RTI-370 failed to produce locomotor stimulation in mice. In addition to this, in drug substitution tests RTI-370 weakly generalized to cocaine whereas RTI-371 did not generalize at all.

This phenomenon has also been observed for other dopamine reuptake inhibitors from other classes. It may be caused by lack of BBB penetration, or interactions at alternative receptor sites.

== See also ==
- List of cocaine analogues
- List of phenyltropanes
