= JWH-147 =

Chemical compound

Legal status
- Legal status: UK: Class B; US: Schedule I; Illegal in Sweden

Identifiers
- IUPAC name: (1-Hexyl-5-phenyl-1H-pyrrol-3-yl)-1-naphthalenyl-methanone
- CAS Number: 914458-20-1
- ChemSpider: 23277882
- UNII: MQ6N4B8QWE
- CompTox Dashboard (EPA): DTXSID00658823

Chemical and physical data
- Formula: C_{27}H_{27}NO
- Molar mass: 381.519 g·mol^{−1}
- 3D model (JSmol): Interactive image
- SMILES: c4ccccc4-c2cc(cn2CCCCCC)C(=O)c1cccc3c1cccc3
- InChI: InChI=1S/C27H27NO/c1-2-3-4-10-18-28-20-23(19-26(28)22-13-6-5-7-14-22)27(29)25-17-11-15-21-12-8-9-16-24(21)25/h5-9,11-17,19-20H,2-4,10,18H2,1H3; Key:FRMYAMAGHYHNKF-UHFFFAOYSA-N

JWH-147 is an analgesic drug used in scientific research, which acts as a cannabinoid agonist at both the CB_{1} and CB_{2} receptors. It is somewhat selective for the CB_{2} subtype, with a K_{i} of 11.0 nM at CB_{1} vs 7.1 nM at CB_{2}. It was discovered and named after the renowned professor of organic chemistry John W. Huffman.

== Legal status ==
In the United States, CB_{1} receptor agonists of the 3-(1-naphthoyl)pyrrole class such as JWH-147 are Schedule I Controlled Substances.

JWH-147 was banned in Sweden on 1 October 2010 as harmful to health, after being identified as an ingredient in "herbal" synthetic cannabis products.

== See also ==
- JWH-030
- JWH-307
