= Nabazenil =

Chemical compound

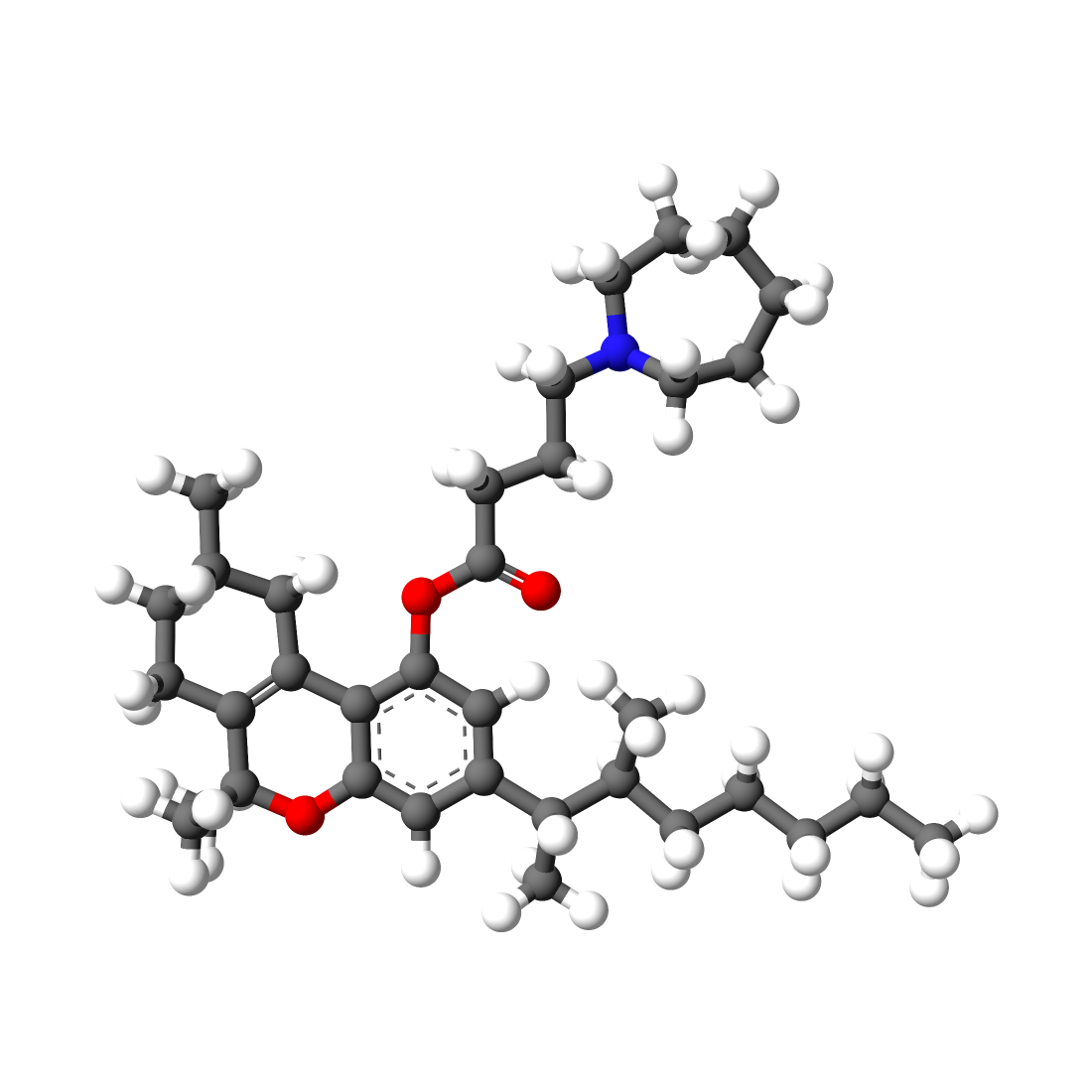

Identifiers
- IUPAC name: (6,6,9-trimethyl-3-(3-methyloctan-2-yl)-7,8,9,10-tetrahydrobenzo[c]chromen-1-yl)-4-(azepan-1-yl)butanoate
- CAS Number: 58019-65-1
- PubChem CID: 163326
- ChemSpider: 143331
- UNII: N1RX70K36C
- CompTox Dashboard (EPA): DTXSID40866667

Chemical and physical data
- Formula: C_{35}H_{55}NO_{3}
- Molar mass: 537.829 g·mol^{−1}
- 3D model (JSmol): Interactive image
- SMILES: CCCCCC(C)C(C)C1=CC2=C(C3=C(CCC(C3)C)C(O2)(C)C)C(=C1)OC(=O)CCCN4CCCCCC4
- InChI: InChI=1S/C35H55NO3/c1-7-8-11-15-26(3)27(4)28-23-31(38-33(37)16-14-21-36-19-12-9-10-13-20-36)34-29-22-25(2)17-18-30(29)35(5,6)39-32(34)24-28/h23-27H,7-22H2,1-6H3; Key:DRVZFWZGQKGHQO-UHFFFAOYSA-N

Nabazenil (SP-175) is a synthetic cannabinoid receptor agonist, which has anticonvulsant properties.
