= AM-6545 =

Chemical compound

Identifiers
- IUPAC name: 5-(4-[4-cyanobut-1-ynyl]phenyl)-1-(2,4-dichlorophenyl)-4-methyl-N-(1,1-dioxo-thiomorpholino)-1H-pyrazole-3-carboxamide
- CAS Number: 1245626-05-4
- PubChem CID: 46912919
- ChemSpider: 26333263
- ChEBI: CHEBI:231613
- CompTox Dashboard (EPA): DTXSID70677329
- ECHA InfoCard: 100.216.518

Chemical and physical data
- Formula: C_{26}H_{23}Cl_{2}N_{5}O_{3}S
- Molar mass: 556.46 g·mol^{−1}
- 3D model (JSmol): Interactive image
- SMILES: O=S4(=O)CCN(CC4)NC(=O)c1nn(-c2ccc(Cl)cc2Cl)c(c1C)-c3ccc(C#CCCC#N)cc3
- InChI: InChI=1S/C26H23Cl2N5O3S/c1-18-24(26(34)31-32-13-15-37(35,36)16-14-32)30-33(23-11-10-21(27)17-22(23)28)25(18)20-8-6-19(7-9-20)5-3-2-4-12-29/h6-11,17H,2,4,13-16H2,1H3,(H,31,34); Key:XBHQLFVDGLPBCK-UHFFFAOYSA-N

AM-6545 is a drug which acts as a peripherally selective silent antagonist for the CB_{1} receptor, and was developed for the treatment of obesity. Other cannabinoid antagonists such as rimonabant have been marketed for this application, but have subsequently been withdrawn from sale because of centrally mediated side effects such as depression and nausea. Because AM-6545 does not cross the blood–brain barrier to any significant extent, it does not produce these kinds of side effects, but has still been shown to effectively reduce appetite and food consumption in animal studies.

== See also ==
- CB-13 – a peripherally selective cannabinoid agonist
- O-2050 – a centrally active CB_{1} silent antagonist
- Methylnaltrexone – a peripherally selective mu opioid receptor antagonist
- TM-38837 - another peripherally selective cannabinoid antagonist
