= O-1125 =

Chemical compound

Identifiers
- IUPAC name: 6-[(6aR,10aR)-1-Hydroxy-6,6,9-trimethyl-6a,7,10,10a-tetrahydrobenzo[c]chromen-3-yl]-N,N,6-trimethylheptanamide
- CAS Number: 228997-38-4
- PubChem CID: 9909689
- ChemSpider: 8085340
- CompTox Dashboard (EPA): DTXSID401027445

Chemical and physical data
- Formula: C_{26}H_{39}NO_{3}
- Molar mass: 413.602 g·mol^{−1}
- 3D model (JSmol): Interactive image
- SMILES: CC1=CC[C@@H]2[C@@H](C1)C3=C(C=C(C=C3OC2(C)C)C(C)(C)CCCCC(=O)N(C)C)O
- InChI: InChI=1S/C26H39NO3/c1-17-11-12-20-19(14-17)24-21(28)15-18(16-22(24)30-26(20,4)5)25(2,3)13-9-8-10-23(29)27(6)7/h11,15-16,19-20,28H,8-10,12-14H2,1-7H3/t19-,20-/m1/s1; Key:QGBHDXFADXCURB-WOJBJXKFSA-N

O-1125 (3-(1,1-dimethylhexyl-6-dimethylcarboxamide)-Δ8-tetrahydrocannabinol) is a research chemical which is a cannabinoid derivative. It has analgesic effects and is used in scientific research. It is a potent CB_{1} full agonist with a K_{i} of 1.16 nM.
