= O-2545 =

Chemical compound

Legal status
- Legal status: In general: unscheduled

Identifiers
- IUPAC name: (6aR,10aR)-6a,7,10,10a-Tetrahydro-3-[5-(1H-imidazol-1-yl)-1,1-dimethylpentyl]-6,6,9-trimethyl-6H-dibenzo[b,d]pyran-1-ol
- CAS Number: 874745-42-3
- ChemSpider: 22938186
- CompTox Dashboard (EPA): DTXSID30635364

Chemical and physical data
- Formula: C_{26}H_{36}N_{2}O_{2}
- Molar mass: 408.586 g·mol^{−1}
- 3D model (JSmol): Interactive image
- SMILES: CC1=CC[C@H]2[C@@](Oc3c(c(cc(c3)C(CCCCn4cncc4)(C)C)O)[C@@H]2C1)(C)C
- InChI: InChI=1S/C26H36N2O2/c1-18-8-9-21-20(14-18)24-22(29)15-19(16-23(24)30-26(21,4)5)25(2,3)10-6-7-12-28-13-11-27-17-28/h8,11,13,15-17,20-21,29H,6-7,9-10,12,14H2,1-5H3/t20-,21-/m1/s1; Key:RZGSWWCABDVBGX-NHCUHLMSSA-N

O-2545 is an analgesic cannabinoid derivative created by Organix Inc. for use in scientific research. Unlike most cannabinoids discovered to date, it is water-soluble, which gives it considerable advantages over many related cannabinoids. It has high affinity for both CB_{1} and CB_{2} receptors, with K_{i} values of 1.5 nM at CB_{1} and 0.32 nM at CB_{2}.

== See also ==
- O-2113
- O-2372
- Tropoxane
