= JWH-210 =

Chemical compound

Legal status
- Legal status: BR: Class F2 (Prohibited psychotropics); CA: Schedule II; DE: Anlage II; UK: Class B; US: Schedule I; Illegal in Sweden, I-N (Poland)

Identifiers
- IUPAC name: 4-Ethylnaphthalen-1-yl-(1-pentylindol-3-yl)methanone
- CAS Number: 824959-81-1 (JWH-210) 824960-02-3 (JWH-182)
- PubChem CID: 45270396
- ChemSpider: 24617616
- UNII: R18JYO04PY
- CompTox Dashboard (EPA): DTXSID301010019
- ECHA InfoCard: 100.233.380

Chemical and physical data
- Formula: C_{26}H_{27}NO
- Molar mass: 369.508 g·mol^{−1}
- 3D model (JSmol): Interactive image
- SMILES: c4cccc2c4c(CC)ccc2C(=O)c(c3)c1ccccc1n3CCCCC
- InChI: InChI=1S/C26H27NO/c1-3-5-10-17-27-18-24(22-13-8-9-14-25(22)27)26(28)23-16-15-19(4-2)20-11-6-7-12-21(20)23/h6-9,11-16,18H,3-5,10,17H2,1-2H3; Key:LACIUQLUNACUKC-UHFFFAOYSA-N

JWH-210 is an analgesic chemical from the naphthoylindole family, which acts as a potent cannabinoid agonist at both the CB_{1} and CB_{2} receptors, with K_{i} values of 0.46 nM at CB_{1} and 0.69 nM at CB_{2}. It is one of the most potent 4-substituted naphthoyl derivatives in the naphthoylindole series, having a higher binding affinity (i.e. lower K_{i}) at CB_{1} than both its 4-methyl and 4-n-propyl homologues JWH-122 (CB_{1} K_{i} 0.69 nM) and JWH-182 (CB_{1} K_{i} 0.65 nM) respectively, and than the 4-methoxy compound JWH-081 (CB_{1} K_{i} 1.2 nM). It was discovered by and named after John W. Huffman.

JWH-210 may be neurotoxic to animals when administered in high doses.

== Legal status ==
In the United States, all CB_{1} receptor agonists of the 3-(1-naphthoyl)indole class such as JWH-210 are Schedule I Controlled Substances.

JWH-210 and JWH-122 were banned in Sweden on 1 October 2010 as hazardous goods harmful to health, after being identified as ingredients in "herbal" synthetic cannabis products. The substances JWH-210, JWH-122 and JWH-203 were classified as illegal drugs by the Swedish government as of 1 September 2011.

As of October 2015 JWH-210 is a controlled substance in China.

== See also ==
- JWH-081
- JWH-193
- JWH-398
