= L-759,656 =

Chemical compound

Identifiers
- IUPAC name: (6aR,10aR)-1-methoxy-6,6-dimethyl-9-methylidene-3-(2-methyloctan-2-yl)-7,8,10,10a-tetrahydro-6aH-benzo[c]chromene
- CAS Number: 174627-56-6
- PubChem CID: 5311216
- IUPHAR/BPS: 749
- ChemSpider: 4470735
- ChEMBL: ChEMBL294013
- CompTox Dashboard (EPA): DTXSID601336684

Chemical and physical data
- Formula: C_{26}H_{40}O_{2}
- Molar mass: 384.604 g·mol^{−1}
- 3D model (JSmol): Interactive image
- SMILES: CCCCCCC(C)(C)c1cc2c(c(c1)OC)[C@@H]3CC(=C)CC[C@H]3C(O2)(C)C
- InChI: InChI=1S/C26H40O2/c1-8-9-10-11-14-25(3,4)19-16-22(27-7)24-20-15-18(2)12-13-21(20)26(5,6)28-23(24)17-19/h16-17,20-21H,2,8-15H2,1,3-7H3/t20-,21-/m1/s1; Key:BJIIKHXAZBTGLF-NHCUHLMSSA-N

L-759,656 is an analgesic drug that is a cannabinoid agonist. It is a highly selective agonist for the CB_{2} receptor, with selectivity of 414x for CB_{2} over CB_{1}, although it is still not as selective as newer agents such as HU-308.

It produces some similar effects to other cannabinoid agonists such as analgesia, but with little or no sedative or psychoactive effects due to its weak CB_{1} activity, and a relatively strong antiinflammatory effect due to its strong activity at CB_{2}.

== See also ==
- Delta-11-Tetrahydrocannabinol
- L-759,633
- L-768,242
