= AMG-41 =

Chemical compound

Identifiers
- IUPAC name: (6aR,10aR)-3-(1-hexylcyclopropyl)-6,6,9-trimethyl-6a,7,10,10a-tetrahydrobenzo[c]chromen-1-ol
- CAS Number: 499237-35-3
- PubChem CID: 10361702
- ChemSpider: 8537151
- UNII: 3062P60MH9
- ChEMBL: ChEMBL19847
- CompTox Dashboard (EPA): DTXSID701027468

Chemical and physical data
- Formula: C_{25}H_{36}O_{2}
- Molar mass: 368.561 g·mol^{−1}
- 3D model (JSmol): Interactive image
- SMILES: C=3CC2C(C)(C)Oc(cc(cc1O)C4(CC4)CCCCCC)c1C2CC=3C
- InChI: InChI=1S/C25H36O2/c1-5-6-7-8-11-25(12-13-25)18-15-21(26)23-19-14-17(2)9-10-20(19)24(3,4)27-22(23)16-18/h9,15-16,19-20,26H,5-8,10-14H2,1-4H3/t19-,20-/m1/s1; Key:UVQIBKXDOZWHFU-WOJBJXKFSA-N

AMG-41 (part of the AM cannabinoid series) is an analgesic drug which is a cannabinoid agonist. It is a derivative of Δ^{8}-THC substituted with a cyclopropyl group on the C1'-position of the C3-alkyl side chain. AMG-41 is a potent agonist at both CB_{1} and CB_{2}, with a K_{i} of 0.44 nM at CB_{1} vs 0.86 nM at CB_{2}.

== See also ==
- 1'-Dimethyl-Δ9-THCH
- AMG-3
- AMG-36
