= TM-38837 =

Chemical compound

Identifiers
- IUPAC name: 1-(2-chlorophenyl)-5-(4-chlorophenyl)-4-(2H-tetrazol-5-ylmethyl)-N-[(1R)-1-[4-(trifluoromethyl)phenyl]ethyl]pyrazole-3-carboxamide
- CAS Number: 1034264-77-1
- PubChem CID: 66772777
- CompTox Dashboard (EPA): DTXSID301018782

Chemical and physical data
- Formula: C_{27}H_{20}Cl_{2}F_{3}N_{7}O
- Molar mass: 586.40 g·mol^{−1}
- 3D model (JSmol): Interactive image
- SMILES: ClC(C=C1)=C(C=C1)N(N=C1C(=O)N[C@H](C)C(C=CC2C(F)(F)F)=CC=2)C(=C1CC(N=N1)=NN1)C(C=CC1Cl)=CC=1
- InChI: InChI=1S/C27H20Cl2F3N7O/c1-15(16-6-10-18(11-7-16)27(30,31)32)33-26(40)24-20(14-23-34-37-38-35-23)25(17-8-12-19(28)13-9-17)39(36-24)22-5-3-2-4-21(22)29/h2-13,15H,14H2,1H3,(H,33,40)(H,34,35,37,38)/t15-/m1/s1; Key:DANBLBWVACCFGQ-OAHLLOKOSA-N

TM-38837 is a small molecule inverse agonist/antagonist of the CB_{1} cannabinoid receptor, with peripheral selectivity. It is being developed for the treatment of obesity and metabolic disorders by 7TM Pharma. The company has announced phase I clinical trials.

TM-38837 is among the first of a new generation of cannabinoid receptor antagonist designed to avoid the central nervous system liabilities of the first generation CB_{1} receptor antagonists such as rimonabant. The structure of TM-38837 has been erronously referred to in the past as compound 8 in reference but is now known from a more recent reference.

== See also ==
- AM-6545
