= JWH-307 =

Chemical compound

Legal status
- Legal status: DE: Anlage II (Authorized trade only, not prescriptible); US: Schedule I

Identifiers
- IUPAC name: (5-(2-Fluorophenyl)-1-pentylpyrrol-3-yl)-naphthalen-1-ylmethanone
- CAS Number: 914458-26-7
- PubChem CID: 16049783
- ChemSpider: 13178178
- UNII: 06QTR14ONW
- CompTox Dashboard (EPA): DTXSID60581542

Chemical and physical data
- Formula: C_{26}H_{24}FNO
- Molar mass: 385.482 g·mol^{−1}
- 3D model (JSmol): Interactive image
- SMILES: CCCCCN1C=C(C=C1C2=CC=CC=C2F)C(=O)C3=CC=CC4=CC=CC=C43
- InChI: InChI=1S/C26H24FNO/c1-2-3-8-16-28-18-20(17-25(28)23-13-6-7-15-24(23)27)26(29)22-14-9-11-19-10-4-5-12-21(19)22/h4-7,9-15,17-18H,2-3,8,16H2,1H3; Key:WYNZPDDTQGVCLZ-UHFFFAOYSA-N

JWH-307 is an analgesic drug used in scientific research, which acts as a cannabinoid agonist at both the CB_{1} and CB_{2} receptors. It is somewhat selective for the CB_{2} subtype, with a K_{i} of 7.7 nM at CB_{1} vs 3.3 nM at CB_{2}. It was discovered by, and named after, John W. Huffman. JWH-307 was detected as an ingredient in synthetic cannabis smoking blends in 2012, initially in Germany.

In the United States, CB_{1} receptor agonists of the 3-(1-naphthoyl)pyrrole class such as JWH-307 are Schedule I Controlled Substances.

== See also ==
- JWH-147
