= GW-405,833 =

Chemical compound

Identifiers
- IUPAC name: 1-(2,3-Dichlorobenzoyl)-5-methoxy-2-methyl-3-[2-(4-morpholinyl)ethyl]-1H-indole
- CAS Number: 180002-83-9
- PubChem CID: 9911463
- ChemSpider: 8087114
- UNII: 85K154W99L
- ChEBI: CHEBI:92184
- ChEMBL: ChEMBL73711
- CompTox Dashboard (EPA): DTXSID20432728
- ECHA InfoCard: 100.162.054

Chemical and physical data
- Formula: C_{23}H_{24}Cl_{2}N_{2}O_{3}
- Molar mass: 447.36 g·mol^{−1}
- 3D model (JSmol): Interactive image; Interactive image
- SMILES: CC1=C(C2=C(N1C(=O)C3=C(C(=CC=C3)Cl)Cl)C=CC(=C2)OC)CCN4CCOCC4; C4COCCN4CCc1c(C)n(c(ccc3OC)c1c3)C(=O)c2cccc(Cl)c2Cl
- InChI: InChI=1S/C23H24Cl2N2O3/c1-15-17(8-9-26-10-12-30-13-11-26)19-14-16(29-2)6-7-21(19)27(15)23(28)18-4-3-5-20(24)22(18)25/h3-7,14H,8-13H2,1-2H3; Key:FSFZRNZSZYDVLI-UHFFFAOYSA-N

GW-405,833 (L-768,242) is a drug that acts as a potent and selective partial agonist for the cannabinoid receptor subtype CB_{2}, with an EC_{50} of 0.65 nM and selectivity of around 1200x for CB_{2} over CB_{1} receptors. Animal studies have shown it to possess antiinflammatory and anti-hyperalgesic effects at low doses, followed by ataxia and analgesic effects when the dose is increased. Selective CB_{2} agonist drugs such as GW-405,833 are hoped to be particularly useful in the treatment of allodynia and neuropathic pain for which current treatment options are often inadequate.
