= O-823 =

Chemical compound

Identifiers
- IUPAC name: 7-[(6aR,10aR)-1-hydroxy-6,6,9-trimethyl-6a,7,10,10a-tetrahydrobenzo[c]chromen-3-yl]hept-5-ynenitrile
- CAS Number: 184433-64-5
- PubChem CID: 9863194
- ChemSpider: 8038890
- CompTox Dashboard (EPA): DTXSID801027485

Chemical and physical data
- Formula: C_{23}H_{27}NO_{2}
- Molar mass: 349.474 g·mol^{−1}
- 3D model (JSmol): Interactive image
- SMILES: Oc2cc(CC#CCCCC#N)cc(OC1(C)C)c2C3C1CC=C(C)C3
- InChI: InChI=1S/C23H27NO2/c1-16-10-11-19-18(13-16)22-20(25)14-17(9-7-5-4-6-8-12-24)15-21(22)26-23(19,2)3/h10,14-15,18-19,25H,4,6,8-9,11,13H2,1-3H3/t18-,19-/m1/s1; Key:MZMMIGOIGWVGEH-RTBURBONSA-N

O-823 is a drug which is a cannabinoid derivative that is used in scientific research. It is described as a mixed agonist/antagonist at the cannabinoid receptor CB_{1}, meaning that it acts as an antagonist when co-administered alongside a more potent CB_{1} agonist, but exhibits weak partial agonist effects when administered by itself.
