= AMG-36 =

Chemical compound

Identifiers
- IUPAC name: (6aR,10aR)-3-(1-hexylcyclopentyl)-6,6,9-trimethyl-6a,7,10,10a-tetrahydrobenzo[c]chromen-1-ol
- CAS Number: 579444-43-2
- PubChem CID: 10982174
- ChemSpider: 9157375
- UNII: S37XNJ2D7R
- ChEMBL: ChEMBL108868
- CompTox Dashboard (EPA): DTXSID001027467

Chemical and physical data
- Formula: C_{27}H_{40}O_{2}
- Molar mass: 396.615 g·mol^{−1}
- 3D model (JSmol): Interactive image
- SMILES: CC2(C)Oc1cc(C4(CCCCCC)CCCC4)cc(O)c1C(C3)C2CC=C3C
- InChI: InChI=1S/C27H40O2/c1-5-6-7-8-13-27(14-9-10-15-27)20-17-23(28)25-21-16-19(2)11-12-22(21)26(3,4)29-24(25)18-20/h11,17-18,21-22,28H,5-10,12-16H2,1-4H3/t21-,22-/m1/s1; Key:FONCHEGPDSYFCG-FGZHOGPDSA-N

AMG-36 (part of the AM cannabinoid series) is an analgesic drug which is a cannabinoid agonist. It is a derivative of Δ^{8}-THC substituted with a cyclopentane group on the 3-position side chain. AMG-36 is a potent agonist at both CB_{1} and CB_{2} with moderate selectivity for CB_{1}, with a K_{i} of 0.45 nM at CB_{1} vs 1.92 nM at CB_{2}.

== See also ==
- AMG-3
- AMG-41
