= JWH-122 =

Chemical compound

Legal status
- Legal status: AU: S9 (Prohibited substance); BR: Class F2 (Prohibited psychotropics); CA: Schedule II; DE: Anlage II (Authorized trade only, not prescriptible); UK: Class B; US: Schedule I

Identifiers
- IUPAC name: (4-Methyl-1-naphthyl)-(1-pentylindol-3-yl)methanone
- CAS Number: 619294-47-2
- ChemSpider: 24623066
- UNII: 44147RI31X
- KEGG: C22796
- ChEMBL: ChEMBL557004
- CompTox Dashboard (EPA): DTXSID00210965
- ECHA InfoCard: 100.401.326

Chemical and physical data
- Formula: C_{25}H_{25}NO
- Molar mass: 355.481 g·mol^{−1}
- 3D model (JSmol): Interactive image
- SMILES: CCCCCn1cc(c2c1cccc2)C(=O)c3ccc(c4c3cccc4)C
- InChI: InChI=1S/C25H25NO/c1-3-4-9-16-26-17-23(21-12-7-8-13-24(21)26)25(27)22-15-14-18(2)19-10-5-6-11-20(19)22/h5-8,10-15,17H,3-4,9,16H2,1-2H3; Key:HUKJQMKQFWYIHS-UHFFFAOYSA-N

JWH-122 is a synthetic cannabimimetic that was discovered by John W. Huffman. It is a methylated analogue of JWH-018. It has a K_{i} of 0.69 nM at CB_{1} and 1.2 nM at CB_{2}.

In January 2015, over 40 people were reportedly sickened after eating a holiday bread called Rosca de reyes purchased at a bakery in Santa Ana, California, that was laced with JWH-122.

== Legal status ==
=== Australia ===
JWH-122 is considered a Schedule 9 prohibited substance in Australia under the Poisons Standard (October 2015). A Schedule 9 substance is a substance which may be abused or misused, the manufacture, possession, sale or use of which should be prohibited by law except when required for medical or scientific research, or for analytical, teaching or training purposes with approval of Commonwealth and/or State or Territory Health Authorities.

=== China ===
As of October 2015 JWH-122 is a controlled substance in China.

=== United States ===
In the United States, JWH-122 is a Schedule I Controlled Substance.

== See also ==
- JWH-193
- JWH-210
- JWH-398
- List of JWH cannabinoids
