= JWH-030 =

Chemical compound

Legal status
- Legal status: DE: unscheduled; US: Schedule I

Identifiers
- IUPAC name: Naphthalen-1-yl-(1-pentylpyrrol-3-yl)methanone
- CAS Number: 162934-73-8
- PubChem CID: 9971539
- ChemSpider: 8147131
- UNII: D3WWBII0GZ
- ChEMBL: ChEMBL71810
- CompTox Dashboard (EPA): DTXSID10433522

Chemical and physical data
- Formula: C_{20}H_{21}NO
- Molar mass: 291.394 g·mol^{−1}
- 3D model (JSmol): Interactive image
- SMILES: CCCCCn3cc(cc3)C(=O)c1cccc2ccccc12
- InChI: InChI=1S/C20H21NO/c1-2-3-6-13-21-14-12-17(15-21)20(22)19-11-7-9-16-8-4-5-10-18(16)19/h4-5,7-12,14-15H,2-3,6,13H2,1H3; Key:VPBJQDBKZSHCPC-UHFFFAOYSA-N

JWH-030 is a research chemical which is a cannabinoid receptor agonist. It has analgesic effects and is used in scientific research. It is a partial agonist at CB_{1} receptors, with a K_{i} of 87 nM, making it roughly half the potency of THC. It was discovered and named after John W. Huffman.

In the United States, CB_{1} receptor agonists of the 3-(1-naphthoyl)pyrrole class such as JWH-030 are Schedule I Controlled Substances.

== See also ==
- JWH-145
