= JWH-193 =

Chemical compound

Legal status
- Legal status: CA: Schedule II; DE: NpSG (Industrial and scientific use only); UK: Class B; US: Schedule I

Identifiers
- IUPAC name: (1-(2-Morpholin-4-ylethyl)indol-3-yl)-4-methylnaphthalen-1-ylmethanone
- CAS Number: 133438-58-1
- PubChem CID: 10250276
- ChemSpider: 8425762
- UNII: WB1TIJ1IO9
- CompTox Dashboard (EPA): DTXSID70158108

Chemical and physical data
- Formula: C_{26}H_{26}N_{2}O_{2}
- Molar mass: 398.506 g·mol^{−1}
- 3D model (JSmol): Interactive image
- SMILES: c3cccc1c3c(ccc1C)C(=O)c5c2ccccc2n(c5)CCN4CCOCC4
- InChI: InChI=1S/C26H26N2O2/c1-19-10-11-23(21-7-3-2-6-20(19)21)26(29)24-18-28(25-9-5-4-8-22(24)25)13-12-27-14-16-30-17-15-27/h2-11,18H,12-17H2,1H3; Key:ICKWPPYMDARCKJ-UHFFFAOYSA-N

JWH-193 is a drug from the aminoalkylindole and naphthoylindole families which acts as a cannabinoid receptor agonist. It was invented by the pharmaceutical company Sanofi-Winthrop in the early 1990s. JWH-193 has a binding affinity at the CB_{1} receptor of 6 nM, binding around seven times more tightly than the parent compound JWH-200, though with closer to twice the potency of JWH-200 in activity tests.

In the United States, all CB_{1} receptor agonists of the 3-(1-naphthoyl)indole class such as JWH-193 are Schedule I Controlled Substances.

== Related compounds ==
A structural isomer of JWH-193 with the methyl group on the indole ring instead of the naphthoyl ring, was also found to be of similarly increased potency over JWH-200.

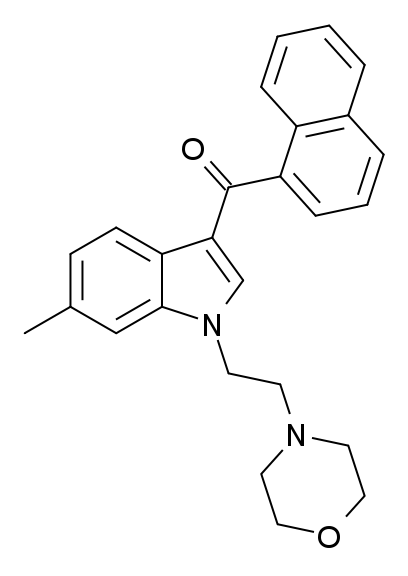
6-Methyl-JWH-200

== See also ==
- JWH-122
- JWH-198
