= JWH-398 =

Chemical compound

Legal status
- Legal status: CA: Schedule II; DE: NpSG (Industrial and scientific use only); UK: Class B; US: Schedule I; Illegal in Latvia

Identifiers
- IUPAC name: 1-Pentyl-3-(4-chloro-1-naphthoyl)indole
- CAS Number: 1292765-18-4
- ChemSpider: 28647395
- UNII: RX0E95S90H
- CompTox Dashboard (EPA): DTXSID40156131

Chemical and physical data
- Formula: C_{24}H_{22}ClNO
- Molar mass: 375.90 g·mol^{−1}
- 3D model (JSmol): Interactive image
- SMILES: c14ccccc1n(CCCCC)cc4C(=O)c(cc3)c2ccccc2c3Cl
- InChI: InChI=1S/C24H22ClNO/c1-2-3-8-15-26-16-21(19-11-6-7-12-23(19)26)24(27)20-13-14-22(25)18-10-5-4-9-17(18)20/h4-7,9-14,16H,2-3,8,15H2,1H3; Key:IUWBHGFOHXVVKV-UHFFFAOYSA-N

JWH-398 is an analgesic chemical from the naphthoylindole family, which acts as a cannabinoid agonist at both the CB_{1} and CB_{2} receptors. It has mild selectivity for CB_{1} with a K_{i} of 2.3 nM and 2.8 nM at CB_{2}. This synthetic chemical compound was identified by the EMCDDA as an ingredient in three separate "herbal incense" products purchased from online shops between February and June 2009. It was discovered by, and named after, John W. Huffman.

In the United States, JWH-398 is a Schedule I controlled substance.

== See also ==
- 5F-JWH-398
- JWH-122
- JWH-424
