= List of JWH cannabinoids =

Substances synthesized by John W. Huffman's research group

The John W. Huffman research group at Clemson University synthesized over 450 cannabinoids. Some of those are:

Cannabinoids and their K_{i} values (Note: K_{i} is the compound's binding affinity for the cannabinoid receptor type 1 (CB_{1}) or cannabinoid receptor type 2 (CB_{2}).)
Name	Class	K_{i} / nM at CB_{1}	K_{i} / nM at CB_{2}	Selectivity	Structure
JWH-004	Naphthoylindole	48 ± 13	4 ± 1.5	CB_{2} (12x)	
JWH-007	Naphthoylindole	9.5 ± 4.5	2.9 ± 2.6	CB_{2} (3.3x)	
JWH-009	Naphthoylindole	>10000	141 ± 14	CB_{2} (>70x)	
JWH-011	Naphthoylindole				
JWH-015	Naphthoylindole	164 ± 22	13.8 ± 4.6	CB_{2} (12x)	
JWH-016	Naphthoylindole	22 ± 1.5	4.3 ± 1.6	CB_{2} (5.1x)	
JWH-018	Naphthoylindole	9 ± 5	2.9 ± 2.6	CB_{2} (3.1x)	
JWH-019	Naphthoylindole	9.8 ± 2	5.55 ± 2	CB_{2} (1.77x)	
JWH-020	Naphthoylindole	128 ± 17	205 ± 20	CB_{1} (1.6x)	
JWH-030	Naphthoylpyrrole	87 ± 3	320 ± 127	CB_{1} (3.7x)	
JWH-031	Naphthoylpyrrole	399 ± 109			
JWH-032	Naphthoylpyrrole	>10000	>10000	—	
JWH-033	Naphthoylpyrrole	666 ± 77			
JWH-036	Naphthoylpyrrole	309 ± 11			
JWH-042	Naphthoylindole	>10000	5050 ± 192	CB_{2}	
JWH-043	Naphthoylindole	1180 ± 44	964 ± 242	CB_{2} (1.2x)	
JWH-044	Naphthoylpyrrole	>10000	>10000	—	
JWH-045	Naphthoylpyrrole	>10000	>10000	—	
JWH-046	Naphthoylindole	343 ± 38	16.3 ± 4.9	CB_{2} (21x)	
JWH-047	Naphthoylindole	59 ± 3	3.47 ± 1.80	CB_{2} (17x)	
JWH-048	Naphthoylindole	10.7 ± 1.0	0.49 ± 0.13	CB_{2} (22x)	
JWH-049	Naphthoylindole	55.1 ± 17.0	32.3 ± 2.4	CB_{2} (1.7x)	
JWH-050	Naphthoylindole	342 ± 6	526 ± 133	CB_{1} (1.5x)	
JWH-051	Dibenzopyran	1.20	0.03	CB_{2} (40x)	
JWH-056	Dibenzopyran	>10000	32 ± 9	CB_{2}	
JWH-057	Dibenzopyran	23 ± 7	2.9 ± 1.6	CB_{2} (8x)	
JWH-065	Dibenzopyran	399 ± 76	10 ± 2	CB_{2} (40x)	
JWH-070	Naphthoylindole	>10000	>10000		
JWH-071	Naphthoylindole	1340 ± 123	2940 ± 852	CB_{1} (2.2x)	
JWH-072	Naphthoylindole	1050 ± 5.5	170 ± 54	CB_{2} (6x)	
JWH-073	Naphthoylindole	8.9 ± 1.8	27 ± 12	CB_{1} (3x)	
JWH-076	Naphthoylindole	214 ± 11	106 ± 46	CB_{2} (2x)	
JWH-077	Naphthoylindole	>10000	>10000		
JWH-078	Naphthoylindole	817 ± 60	633 ± 116	CB_{2} (1.3x)	
JWH-079	Naphthoylindole	63.0 ± 3.0	32.0 ± 6.0	CB_{2} (2x)	
JWH-080	Naphthoylindole	8.9 ± 1.8	2.21 ± 1.30	CB_{2} (4x)	
JWH-081	Naphthoylindole	1.2 ± 0.03	12.4 ± 2.2	CB_{1} (10x)	
JWH-082	Naphthoylindole	5.3 ± 0.8	6.40 ± 0.94	CB_{1} (1.2x)	
JWH-083	Naphthoylindole	106 ± 12	102 ± 50	—	
JWH-091 (Δ^{8}-THCP)	Dibenzopyran	22.0 ± 3.9			
JWH-093	Naphthoylindole	40.7 ± 2.8	59.1 ± 10.5	CB_{1} (1.45x)	
JWH-094	Naphthoylindole	476 ± 67	97.3 ± 2.7	CB_{2} (4.9x)	
JWH-095	Naphthoylindole	140 ± 4.3	312 ± 83	CB_{1} (2.2x)	
JWH-096	Naphthoylindole	33.7 ± 2.9	13.3 ± 5.6	CB_{2} (2.5x)	
JWH-097	Naphthoylindole	455 ± 28	121 ± 15	CB_{2} (3.8x)	
JWH-098	Naphthoylindole	4.5 ± 0.1	1.9 ± 0.3	CB_{2} (2.4x)	
JWH-099	Naphthoylindole	35.3 ± 9.0	17.8 ± 2.9	CB_{2} (2x)	
JWH-100	Naphthoylindole	381 ± 102	155 ± 74	CB_{2} (2.5x)	
JWH-102	Dibenzopyran	7.9 ± 0.9	5.2 ± 2.0	CB_{2} (1.5x)	
JWH-103	Dibenzopyran	28 ± 3	23 ± 7	CB_{2} (1.2x)	
JWH-116	Naphthoylindole	52 ± 5			
JWH-120	Naphthoylindole	1054 ± 31	6.1 ± 0.7	CB_{2} (173x)	
JWH-122	Naphthoylindole	0.69 ± 0.05	1.2 ± 1.2	—	
JWH-124 (Δ^{8}-Parahexyl)	Dibenzopyran	41.0 ± 3.8			
JWH-130 (Δ^{8}-THCB)	Dibenzopyran	65.0 ± 13			
JWH-133	Dibenzopyran	677 ± 132	3.4 ± 1.0	CB_{2} (200x)	
JWH-138	Dibenzopyran	8.5 ± 1.4			
JWH-139	Dibenzopyran	2290 ± 505	14 ± 10	CB_{2} (164x)	
JWH-142	Dibenzopyran	529 ± 49	35 ± 14	CB_{2} (15x)	
JWH-143	Dibenzopyran	924 ± 104	65 ± 8	CB_{2} (14x)	
JWH-145	Naphthoylpyrrole	14 ± 2	6.4 ± 0.4	CB_{2} (2.2x)	
JWH-146	Naphthoylpyrrole	21 ± 2	62 ± 5	CB_{2} (3.0x)	
JWH-147	Naphthoylpyrrole	11 ± 1	7.1 ± 0.2	CB_{2} (1.5x)	
JWH-148	Naphthoylindole	123 ± 8	14.0 ± 1.0	CB_{2} (8x)	
JWH-149	Naphthoylindole	5.0 ± 2.1	0.73 ± 0.03	CB_{2} (6.8x)	
JWH-150	Naphthoylpyrrole	60 ± 1	15 ± 2	CB_{2} (4x)	
JWH-151	Naphthoylindole	>10000	30 ± 1.1	CB_{2} (>333x)	
JWH-153	Naphthoylindole	250 ± 24	11 ± 0.5	CB_{2} (23x)	
JWH-156	Naphthoylpyrrole	404 ± 18	104 ± 18	CB_{2} (4x)	
JWH-159	Naphthoylindole	45 ± 1	10.4 ± 1.4	CB_{2} (4.3x)	
JWH-160	Naphthoylindole	1568 ± 201	441 ± 110	CB_{2} (3.6x)	
JWH-161	Dibenzopyran hybrid	19.0			
JWH-163	Naphthoylindole	2358 ± 215	138 ± 12	CB_{2} (17x)	
JWH-164	Naphthoylindole	6.6 ± 0.7	6.9 ± 0.2	—	
JWH-165	Naphthoylindole	204 ± 26	71 ± 8	CB_{2} (2.9x)	
JWH-166	Naphthoylindole	44 ± 10	1.9 ± 0.08	CB_{2} (23x)	
JWH-167	Phenylacetylindole	90 ± 17	159 ± 14	CB_{1} (1.77x)	
JWH-171	Hydrocarbon	51			
JWH-175	Naphthylmethylindole	22 ± 2			
JWH-176	Hydrocarbon	26 ± 4			
JWH-180	Naphthoylindole	26 ± 2	9.6 ± 2.0	CB_{2} (2.7x)	
JWH-181	Naphthoylindole	1.3 ± 0.1	0.62 ± 0.04	CB_{2} (2.1x)	
JWH-182	Naphthoylindole	0.65 ± 0.03	1.1 ± 0.1	CB_{1} (1.7x)	
JWH-184	Naphthylmethylindole	23 ± 6			
JWH-185	Naphthylmethylindole	17 ± 3			
JWH-186	Dibenzopyran	187 ± 23	5.6 ± 1.7	CB_{2} (33x)	
JWH-187	Dibenzopyran	84 ± 16	3.4 ± 0.5	CB_{2} (25x)	
JWH-188	Dibenzopyran	270 ± 58	18 ± 2	CB_{2} (15x)	
JWH-189	Naphthoylindole	52 ± 2	12 ± 0.8	CB_{2} (4.3x)	
JWH-190	Dibenzopyran	8.8 ± 1.4	1.6 ± 0.03	CB_{2} (5.5x)	
JWH-191	Dibenzopyran	1.8 ± 0.3	0.52 ± 0.03	CB_{2} (3.5x)	
JWH-192	Naphthylmethylindole	41 ± 13			
JWH-193	Naphthoylindole	6 ± 1			
JWH-194	Naphthylmethylindole	127 ± 19			
JWH-195	Naphthylmethylindole	113 ± 28			
JWH-196	Naphthylmethylindole	151 ± 18			
JWH-197	Naphthylmethylindole	323 ± 98			
JWH-198	Naphthoylindole	10 ± 2			
JWH-199	Naphthylmethylindole	20 ± 2			
JWH-200	Naphthoylindole	42 ± 5			
JWH-201	Phenylacetylindole	1064 ± 21	444 ± 14	CB_{2} (2.4x)	
JWH-202	Phenylacetylindole	1678 ± 63	645 ± 6	CB_{2} (2.6x)	
JWH-203	Phenylacetylindole	8.0 ± 0.9	7.0 ± 1.3	—	
JWH-204	Phenylacetylindole	13 ± 1	25 ± 1	CB_{1} (1.9x)	
JWH-205	Phenylacetylindole	124 ± 23	180 ± 9	CB_{1} (1.45x)	
JWH-206	Phenylacetylindole	389 ± 25	498 ± 37	CB_{1} (1.28x)	
JWH-207	Phenylacetylindole	1598 ± 134	3723 ± 10	CB_{1} (2.33x)	
JWH-208	Phenylacetylindole	179 ± 7	570 ± 127	CB_{1} (3.18x)	
JWH-209	Phenylacetylindole	746 ± 49	1353 ± 270	CB_{1} (1.81x)	
JWH-210	Naphthoylindole	0.46 ± 0.03	0.69 ± 0.01	CB_{1} (1.5x)	
JWH-211	Naphthoylindole	70 ± 0.8	12 ± 0.8	CB_{2} (5.8x)	
JWH-212	Naphthoylindole	33 ± 0.9	10 ± 1.2	CB_{2} (3.3x)	
JWH-213	Naphthoylindole	1.5 ± 0.2	0.42 ± 0.05	CB_{2} (3.6x)	
JWH-215	Dibenzopyran	1008 ± 117	85 ± 21	CB_{2} (12x)	
JWH-216	Dibenzopyran	1856 ± 148	333 ± 104	CB_{2} (5.6x)	
JWH-217	Dibenzopyran	>10000	1404 ± 66	CB_{2} (>7x)	
JWH-220	Hydrocarbon	19			
JWH-224	Dibenzopyran	347 ± 34	28 ± 1	CB_{2} (12.3x)	
JWH-225	Dibenzopyran	>10000	325 ± 70	CB_{2} (>31x)	
JWH-226	Dibenzopyran	4001 ± 282	43 ± 3	CB_{2} (93x)	
JWH-227	Dibenzopyran	40 ± 6	4.4 ± 0.3	CB_{2} (9x)	
JWH-229	Dibenzopyran	3134 ± 110	18 ± 2	CB_{2} (174x)	
JWH-230	Dibenzopyran	15 ± 3	1.4 ± 0.12	CB_{2} (10.7x)	
JWH-233	Dibenzopyran	14 ± 3	1.0 ± 0.3	CB_{2} (14x)	
JWH-234	Naphthoylindole	8.4 ± 1.8	3.8 ± 0.6	CB_{2} (2.2x)	
JWH-235	Naphthoylindole	338 ± 34	123 ± 34	CB_{2} (2.7x)	
JWH-236	Naphthoylindole	1351 ± 204	240 ± 63	CB_{2} (5.6x)	
JWH-237	Phenylacetylindole	38 ± 10	106 ± 2	CB_{1} (2.8x)	
JWH-239	Naphthoylindole	342 ± 20	52 ± 6	CB_{2} (6.6x)	
JWH-240	Naphthoylindole	14 ± 1	7.2 ± 1.3	CB_{2} (1.9x)	
JWH-241	Naphthoylindole	147 ± 20	49 ± 7	CB_{2} (3.0x)	
JWH-242	Naphthoylindole	42 ± 9	6.5 ± 0.3	CB_{2} (6.5x)	
JWH-243	Naphthoylpyrrole	285 ± 40	41 ± 3	CB_{2} (6.95x)	
JWH-244	Naphthoylpyrrole	130 ± 6	18 ± 1	CB_{2} (7.22x)	
JWH-245	Naphthoylpyrrole	276 ± 4	25 ± 2	CB_{2} (11x)	
JWH-246	Naphthoylpyrrole	70 ± 4	16 ± 1	CB_{2} (4.38x)	
JWH-247	Dibenzopyran	427 ± 31	99 ± 4	CB_{2} (4.3x)	
JWH-248	Phenylacetylindole	1028 ± 39	657 ± 19	CB_{2} (1.56x)	
JWH-249	Phenylacetylindole	8.4 ± 1.8	20 ± 2	CB_{1} (2.38x)	
JWH-250	Phenylacetylindole	11 ± 2	33 ± 2	CB_{1} (3x)	
JWH-251	Phenylacetylindole	29 ± 3	146 ± 36	CB_{2} (5x)	
JWH-252	Phenylacetylindole	23 ± 3	19 ± 1	CB_{2} (1.2x)	
JWH-253	Phenylacetylindole	62 ± 10	84 ± 12	CB_{1} (1.35x)	
JWH-254	Dibenzopyran	4724 ± 509	319 ± 16	CB_{2} (14.8x)	
JWH-256	Dibenzopyran	4300 ± 888	97 ± 18	CB_{2} (44x)	
JWH-258	Naphthoylindole	4.6 ± 0.6	10.5 ± 1.3	CB_{1} (2.3x)	
JWH-259	Naphthoylindole	220 ± 29	74 ± 7	CB_{2} (3.0x)	
JWH-260	Naphthoylindole	29 ± 0.4	25 ± 1.9	CB_{2} (1.2x)	
JWH-261	Naphthoylindole	767 ± 105	221 ± 14	CB_{2} (3.5x)	
JWH-262	Naphthoylindole	28 ± 3	5.6 ± 0.7	CB_{2} (5.0x)	
JWH-265	Naphthoylindole	3788 ± 323	80 ± 13	CB_{2} (47x)	
JWH-266	Naphthoylindole	>10000	455 ± 55	CB_{2} (>22x)	
JWH-267	Naphthoylindole	381 ± 16	7.2 ± 0.14	CB_{2} (53x)	
JWH-268	Naphthoylindole	1379 ± 193	40 ± 0.6	CB_{2} (34x)	
JWH-277	Dibenzopyran	3905 ± 91	589 ± 65	CB_{2} (6.6x)	
JWH-278	Dibenzopyran	906 ± 80	69 ± 6	CB_{2} (13x)	
JWH-292	Naphthoylpyrrole	29 ± 1	20 ± 1	CB_{2} (1.45x)	
JWH-293	Naphthoylpyrrole	100 ± 5	41 ± 4	CB_{2} (2.44x)	
JWH-298	Dibenzopyran	812 ± 67	198 ± 23	CB_{2} (4.1x)	
JWH-299	Dibenzopyran	415 ± 50	30 ± 2	CB_{2} (13.8x)	
JWH-300	Dibenzopyran	118 ± 16	5.3 ± 0.1	CB_{2} (22x)	
JWH-301	Dibenzopyran	295 ± 64	48 ± 4	CB_{2} (6.1x)	
JWH-302	Phenylacetylindole	17 ± 2	89 ± 15	CB_{1} (5.26x)	
JWH-303	Phenylacetylindole	117 ± 10	138 ± 12	CB_{1} (1.18x)	
JWH-304	Phenylacetylindole	3363 ± 332	2679 ± 688	CB_{2} (1.26x)	
JWH-305	Phenylacetylindole	15 ± 1.8	29 ± 5	CB_{1} (1.93x)	
JWH-306	Phenylacetylindole	25 ± 1	82 ± 11	CB_{1} (3.28x)	
JWH-307	Naphthoylpyrrole	7.7 ± 1.8	3.3 ± 0.2	CB_{2} (2.33x)	
JWH-308	Naphthoylpyrrole	41 ± 1	33 ± 2	CB_{2} (1.24x)	
JWH-309	Naphthoylpyrrole	41 ± 3	49 ± 7	CB_{1} (1.20x)	
JWH-310	Dibenzopyran	1059 ± 51	36 ± 3	CB_{2} (29x)	
JWH-311	Phenylacetylindole	23 ± 2	39 ± 3	CB_{1} (1.70x)	
JWH-312	Phenylacetylindole	72 ± 7	91 ± 20	CB_{1} (1.26x)	
JWH-313	Phenylacetylindole	422 ± 19	365 ± 92	CB_{2} (1.16x)	
JWH-314	Phenylacetylindole	39 ± 2	76 ± 4	CB_{1} (1.95x)	
JWH-315	Phenylacetylindole	430 ± 24	182 ± 23	CB_{2} (3.36x)	
JWH-316	Phenylacetylindole	2862 ± 670	781 ± 105	CB_{2} (3.66x)	
JWH-336	Dibenzopyran	4589 ± 367	153 ± 15	CB_{2} (30x)	
JWH-338	Dibenzopyran	>10000	111 ± 16	CB_{2} (>90x)	
JWH-339	Dibenzopyran	>10000	2317 ± 93	CB_{2} (>4.3x)	
JWH-340	Dibenzopyran	135 ± 6	30 ± 1	CB_{2} (4.5x)	
JWH-341	Dibenzopyran	100 ± 8	10 ± 0.1	CB_{2} (10x)	
JWH-346	Naphthoylpyrrole	67 ± 6	39 ± 2	CB_{2} (1.72x)	
JWH-347	Naphthoylpyrrole	333 ± 17	169 ± 17	CB_{2} (1.97x)	
JWH-348	Naphthoylpyrrole	218 ± 19	53 ± 1	CB_{2} (4.11x)	
JWH-349	Dibenzopyran	376 ± 1	38 ± 4	CB_{2} (9.9x)	
JWH-350	Dibenzopyran	395 ± 50	12 ± 1	CB_{2} (33x)	
JWH-351	Dibenzopyran	>10000	295 ± 3	CB_{2} (>34x)	
JWH-352	Dibenzopyran	>10000	47 ± 2	CB_{2} (>213x)	
JWH-353	Dibenzopyran	1493 ± 10	31 ± 1	CB_{2} (48x)	
JWH-354	Dibenzopyran	1961 ± 21	241 ± 14	CB_{2} (8.1x)	
JWH-355	Dibenzopyran	2162 ± 220	108 ± 17	CB_{2} (20x)	
JWH-356	Dibenzopyran	5837 ± 701	108 ± 17	CB_{2} (54x)	
JWH-357	Dibenzopyran	647 ± 78	185 ± 4	CB_{2} (3.5x)	
JWH-358	Dibenzopyran	1243 ± 266	52 ± 3	CB_{2} (24x)	
JWH-359	Dibenzopyran	2918 ± 450	13.0 ± 0.2	CB_{2} (220x)	
JWH-360	Dibenzopyran	2449 ± 606	160 ± 8	CB_{2} (15x)	
JWH-361	Dibenzopyran	63 ± 3	2.7 ± 0.1	CB_{2} (23x)	
JWH-362	Dibenzopyran	127 ± 8	34 ± 5	CB_{2} (3.7x)	
JWH-363	Naphthoylpyrrole	245 ± 5	71 ± 1	CB_{2} (3.45x)	
JWH-364	Naphthoylpyrrole	34 ± 3	29 ± 1	CB_{2} (1.17x)	
JWH-365	Naphthoylpyrrole	17 ± 1	3.4 ± 0.2	CB_{2} (5.0x)	
JWH-366	Naphthoylpyrrole	191 ± 12	24 ± 1	CB_{2} (7.96x)	
JWH-367	Naphthoylpyrrole	53 ± 2	23 ± 1	CB_{2} (2.30x)	
JWH-368	Naphthoylpyrrole	16 ± 1	9.1 ± 0.7	CB_{2} (1.76x)	
JWH-369	Naphthoylpyrrole	7.9 ± 0.4	5.2 ± 0.3	CB_{2} (1.52x)	
JWH-370	Naphthoylpyrrole	5.6 ± 0.4	4.0 ± 0.5	CB_{2} (1.40x)	
JWH-371	Naphthoylpyrrole	42 ± 1	64 ± 2	CB_{1} (1.52x)	
JWH-372	Naphthoylpyrrole	77 ± 2	8.2 ± 0.2	CB_{1} (9.39x)	
JWH-373	Naphthoylpyrrole	60 ± 3	69 ± 2	CB_{1} (1.15x)	
JWH-387	Naphthoylindole	1.2 ± 0.1	1.1 ± 0.1	—	
JWH-398	Naphthoylindole	2.3 ± 0.1	2.8 ± 0.2	CB_{1} (1.22x)	
JWH-416	Naphthoylindole	73 ± 10	3.3 ± 0.1	CB_{2} (22x)	
JWH-417	Naphthoylindole	522 ± 58	13 ± 0.2	CB_{2} (40x)	
JWH-422	Naphthoylindole	501 ± 48	20 ± 0.4	CB_{2} (25x)	
JWH-423	Naphthoylindole	140 ± 10	6.6 ± 0.2	CB_{2} (21x)	
JWH-424	Naphthoylindole	21 ± 3.4	5.4 ± 0.2	CB_{2} (3.9x)	
JWH-425	Naphthoylindole	54 ± 11	10 ± 0.4	CB_{2} (5.4x)	

== See also ==
- List of AM cannabinoids
- List of CP cannabinoids
- List of HU cannabinoids
- List of miscellaneous designer cannabinoids
