= C28H29NO =

The molecular formula C_{28}H_{29}NO (molar mass: 395.546 g/mol) may refer to:

- JWH-146
- JWH-364
- JWH-365
