= JWH =

JWH may refer to:

- John Wesley Hardin, an American gun-fighter from the 18th century
  - John Wesley Harding, a 1967 album by Bob Dylan
- John W. Henry, futures trader and owner of the Boston Red Sox
- John Winston Howard, former Prime Minister of Australia
- JWH-133, a medication used to prevent Alzheimer's disease
- John W. Huffman, creator of the JWH cannabinoids
- Jared Waerea-Hargreaves, New Zealand rugby league player for Hull Kingston Rovers
