= C25H25NO =

The molecular formula C_{25}H_{25}NO (molar mass: 355.47 g/mol, exact mass: 355.1936 u) may refer to:

- JWH-007
- JWH-019
- JWH-047
- JWH-122
