= MDA-19 =

Chemical compound

Legal status
- Legal status: BR: Class F2 (Prohibited psychotropics); CA: Schedule II

Identifiers
- IUPAC name: (3Z)-N′-(1-Hexyl-2-oxoindolin-3-ylidene)benzohydrazide
- CAS Number: 1048973-47-2 1104302-26-2 (alternative)
- PubChem CID: 25034599
- ChemSpider: 24689676
- UNII: X83OI5CX2U
- CompTox Dashboard (EPA): DTXSID201029871

Chemical and physical data
- Formula: C_{21}H_{23}N_{3}O_{2}
- Molar mass: 349.434 g·mol^{−1}
- 3D model (JSmol): Interactive image
- SMILES: O=C(C1=CC=CC=C1)N/N=C(C2=CC=CC=C2N3CCCCCC)\C3=O
- InChI: InChI=1S/C21H23N3O2/c1-2-3-4-10-15-24-18-14-9-8-13-17(18)19(21(24)26)22-23-20(25)16-11-6-5-7-12-16/h5-9,11-14H,2-4,10,15H2,1H3,(H,23,25)/b22-19-; Key:ZGQHMZCITJHYOW-QOCHGBHMSA-N

MDA-19 (also known as BZO-HEXOXIZID) is a drug that acts as a potent and selective agonist for the cannabinoid receptor CB_{2}, with reasonable selectivity over the psychoactive CB_{1} receptor, though with some variation between species. In animal studies it was effective for the treatment of neuropathic pain, but did not affect rat locomotor activity in that specific study. The pharmacology of MDA-19 in rat cannabinoid receptors have been demonstrated to function differently than human cannabinoid receptors with MDA-19 binding to human CB_{1} receptors 6.9× higher than rat CB_{1} receptors.

== Discovery ==
MDA-19 was first synthesized and studied in the late 2000s by researchers at the University of Texas MD Anderson Cancer Center.

== Pharmacology ==
MDA-19 binds to human CB_{2} receptors at K_{i} = 43.3 ± 10.3 nM and human CB_{1} receptors at K_{i} = 162.4 ± 7.6 nM and functions as an agonist in human cannabinoid receptors but functions differently in rat cannabinoid receptors binding to rat cannabinoid CB_{2} receptors at K_{i} = 16.3 ± 2.1 and CB_{1} receptors at K_{i} = 1130 ± 574 nM binding to rat CB_{1} receptors 6.9× weaker than human CB_{1} receptors but increased binding for CB_{2}. MDA-19 is an agonist at human CB_{1} and CB_{2} receptors as well as rat CB_{1} receptors but functions as an inverse agonist in rat CB_{2} receptors.

== Society and culture ==
MDA-19 along with its shortened Pentyl tailchain analog (MDA-19-Pentyl / 5Carbon-MDA-19/ BZO-POXIZID) and its 5-Fluoro Pentyl analog (5F-MDA-19 /5F-BZO-POXIZID) and its Cyclohexylmethyl analog (CHM-MDA-19 / BZO-CHMOXIZID) was identified in synthetic smoke blends seized in the United States as early as September 2021. United States Border Protection Officers identified BZO-4en-POXIZID (also known as 4en-pentyl-MDA-19) as early as February, 2022 The Center for Forensic Science Research & Education (CFSRE) analyzed 11 samples of suspected synthetic smoke blends between May and September 2022 within the Philadelphia area and found the pentyl analog of MDA-19 in 5 out of 11 samples. Despite their reported lower CB_{1} binding affinity, other low CB_{1} binding synthetic cannabinoids such as UR-144 (K_{i} = 150 nM CB_{1} and K_{i} = 1.8 nM CB_{2}) and XLR-11 (EC_{50} values of 98 nM CB_{1} and 83 nM CB_{2}) have been previously identified in smoke blends in 2012.

== Legality ==
In the United States, As of October 20, 2024 MDA-19 is legal at the federal level, but may be considered illegal if intended for human consumption under the federal analogue act.

North Dakota has placed MDA-19 (along with BZO-CHMOXIZID (CHM-MDA-19), BZO-POXIZID (Pentyl MDA-19), 5F-BZO-POXIZID (5F-MDA-19) and BZO-4en-POXIZID (4en-pentyl MDA-19) into Schedule I on 04/27/23.

In China, the May 2021 ban on specific synthetic cannabinoid core classes does not include the class of cannabinoids MDA-19 belongs to.

== See also ==
- BZO-CHMOXIZID
- JWH-007
- JWH-116
- JWH-196
- AM-1221
- JWH-015
- JWH-047
- JWH-167
- JTE 7-31
- UR-144
- XLR-11
