= C30H33NO =

The molecular formula C_{30}H_{33}NO (molar mass: 423.6 g/mol) may refer to:

- JWH-371
- JWH-373
