= C25H38O2 =

The molecular formula C_{25}H_{38}O_{2} (molar mass: 370.57 g/mol, exact mass: 370.2872 u) may refer to:

- CBD-DMH, or DMH-CBD
- Dimethylheptylpyran
- JWH-051
- Penmesterol, or penmestrol
- Variecolol
- Δ8-THC-DMH
