= C26H27NO =

The molecular formula C_{26}H_{27}NO (molar mass: 369.50 g/mol, exact mass: 369.2093 u) may refer to:

- JWH-048
- JWH-116
- JWH-149
- JWH-210
