= C27H27NO2 =

The molecular formula C_{27}H_{27}NO_{2} (molar mass: 397.51 g/mol, exact mass: 397.204179 u) may refer to:

- JWH-367
- CHM-081
