= JWH-057 =

Chemical compound

Legal status
- Legal status: DE: unscheduled

Identifiers
- IUPAC name: (6aR,10aR)-3-(1,1-Dimethylheptyl)-6a,7,10,10a-tetrahydro-6,6,9-trimethyl-6H-Dibenzo[b,d]pyran
- CAS Number: 105823-04-9
- ChemSpider: 114395
- UNII: 8I28LF0B2D
- CompTox Dashboard (EPA): DTXSID90147357

Chemical and physical data
- Formula: C_{25}H_{38}O
- Molar mass: 354.578 g·mol^{−1}
- 3D model (JSmol): Interactive image
- SMILES: CCCCCCC(C)(C)C1=CC2=C(C=C1)[C@@H]3CC(=CC[C@H]3C(O2)(C)C)C
- InChI: InChI=1S/C25H38O/c1-7-8-9-10-15-24(3,4)19-12-13-20-21-16-18(2)11-14-22(21)25(5,6)26-23(20)17-19/h11-13,17,21-22H,7-10,14-16H2,1-6H3/t21-,22+/m0/s1; Key:JEEFMLVJZKFOFV-FCHUYYIVSA-N

JWH-057, also known as deoxy-Δ8-THC-DMH, is a selective cannabinoid ligand, with a binding affinity of K_{i} = 2.9 ± 1.6 nM for the CB_{2} subtype, and K_{i} = 23 ± 7 nM for CB_{1}.

== See also ==
- Δ8-THC-DMH
- JWH-015
- JWH-018
- JWH-019
- JWH-073
