= C27H24F3NO =

The molecular formula C_{27}H_{24}F_{3}NO (molar mass: 435.49 g/mol) may refer to:

- JWH-363
- JWH-372
- JWH-348
