= JWH-007 =

Chemical compound

Legal status
- Legal status: CA: Schedule II; DE: Anlage II (Authorized trade only, not prescriptible); UK: Class B; US: Schedule I

Identifiers
- IUPAC name: 1-Pentyl-2-methyl-3-(1-naphthoyl)indole
- CAS Number: 155471-10-6
- PubChem CID: 10360860
- ChemSpider: 8536309
- UNII: 5IQ75333OM
- CompTox Dashboard (EPA): DTXSID20165903

Chemical and physical data
- Formula: C_{25}H_{25}NO
- Molar mass: 355.481 g·mol^{−1}
- 3D model (JSmol): Interactive image
- SMILES: c14ccccc4cccc1C(=O)c3c2ccccc2n(c3C)CCCCC
- InChI: InChI=1S/C25H25NO/c1-3-4-9-17-26-18(2)24(22-14-7-8-16-23(22)26)25(27)21-15-10-12-19-11-5-6-13-20(19)21/h5-8,10-16H,3-4,9,17H2,1-2H3; Key:IBBNKINXTRKICJ-UHFFFAOYSA-N

JWH-007 is an analgesic chemical from the naphthoylindole family, which acts as a cannabinoid agonist at both the CB_{1} and CB_{2} receptors. It was first reported in 1994 by a group including the noted cannabinoid chemist John W. Huffman. It was the most active of the first group of N-alkyl naphoylindoles discovered by the team led by John W Huffman, several years after the family was initially described with the discovery of the N-morpholinylethyl compounds pravadoline (WIN 48,098), JWH-200 (WIN 55,225) and WIN 55,212-2 by the Sterling Winthrop group. Several other N-alkyl substituents were found to be active by Huffman's team including the n-butyl, n-hexyl, 2-heptyl, and cyclohexylethyl groups, but it was subsequently determined that the 2-methyl group on the indole ring is not required for CB_{1} binding, and tends to increase affinity for CB_{2} instead. Consequently, the 2-desmethyl derivative of JWH-007, JWH-018, has slightly higher binding affinity for CB_{1}, with an optimum binding of 9.00 nM at CB_{1} and 2.94 nM at CB_{2}, and JWH-007 displayed optimum binding of 9.50 nM at CB_{1} and 2.94 nM at CB_{2}.

== Legal status ==
In the United States, all CB_{1} receptor agonists of the 3-(1-naphthoyl)indole class such as JWH-007 are Schedule I Controlled Substances.

JWH-007 was banned in Sweden on 1 October 2010 after being identified as an ingredient in "herbal" synthetic cannabis products.

JWH-007 has been illegal in Poland since August 2010.

As of October 2015 JWH-007 is a controlled substance in China.

JWH-007 has been classified under the German BtMG as Anlage II.

== See also ==
- JWH-015
- JWH-018
- JWH-019
- JWH-073
- List of JWH cannabinoids
