= C25H25NO2 =

The molecular formula C_{25}H_{25}NO_{2} (molar mass: 371.47 g/mol, exact mass: 371.1885 u) may refer to:

- JWH-081
- JWH-164
