= JWH-145 =

Chemical compound

Legal status
- Legal status: CA: Schedule II; UK: Class B

Identifiers
- IUPAC name: 1-naphthalenyl(1-pentyl-5-phenyl-1H-pyrrol-3-yl)-methanone
- CAS Number: 914458-19-8
- PubChem CID: 44418304
- ChemSpider: 23277878
- UNII: JRT5F2Y0NA
- ChEMBL: ChEMBL385940
- CompTox Dashboard (EPA): DTXSID401016339

Chemical and physical data
- Formula: C_{26}H_{25}NO
- Molar mass: 367.492 g·mol^{−1}
- 3D model (JSmol): Interactive image
- SMILES: O=C(C1=CN(CCCCC)C(C2=CC=CC=C2)=C1)C3=C(C=CC=C4)C4=CC=C3
- InChI: InChI=1S/C26H25NO/c1-2-3-9-17-27-19-22(18-25(27)21-12-5-4-6-13-21)26(28)24-16-10-14-20-11-7-8-15-23(20)24/h4-8,10-16,18-19H,2-3,9,17H2,1H3; Key:JLXYYSHMURZHKI-UHFFFAOYSA-N

JWH-145 (1-naphthalenyl(1-pentyl-5-phenyl-1H-pyrrol-3-yl)-methanone) is a synthetic cannabinoid from the naphthoylpyrrole family which acts as an agonist of the CB_{1} (K_{i} = 14 ± 2nM) and CB_{2} (K_{i} = 6.4 ± 0.4nM) receptors, with a moderate (~2.2x) selectivity for the CB_{2} receptor. JWH-145 was first synthesized in 2006 by John W. Huffman and colleagues to examine the nature of ligand binding to the CB_{1} receptor.

== Legality ==
In the United States JWH-145 is not federally scheduled, although some states have passed legislation banning the sale, possession, and manufacture of JWH-145.

In Canada, JWH-145 and other naphthoylpyrrole-based cannabinoids are Schedule II controlled substances under the Controlled Drugs and Substances Act.

In the United Kingdom, JWH-145 and other naphthoylpyrrole-based cannabinoids are considered Class B drugs under the Misuse of Drugs Act 1971.

== See also ==
- List of JWH cannabinoids
- Synthetic cannabinoid
