= JWH-185 =

Chemical compound

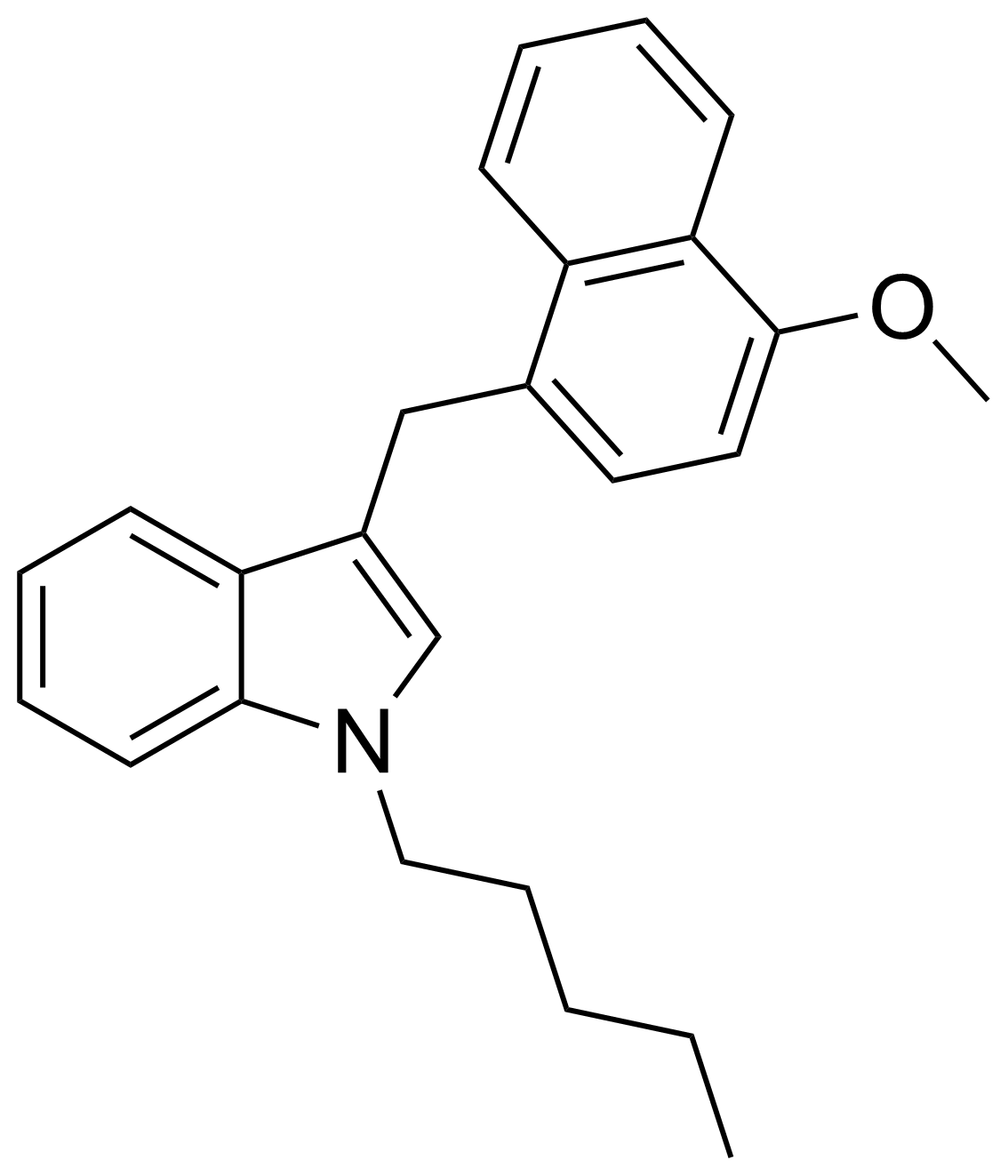

Legal status
- Legal status: UK: Class B; US: Schedule I

Identifiers
- IUPAC name: 3-[(4-Methoxy-1-naphthalenyl)methyl]-1-pentyl-1H-indole
- CAS Number: 619294-39-2
- ChemSpider: 35303440
- UNII: T981O5QY3V

Chemical and physical data
- Formula: C_{25}H_{27}NO
- Molar mass: 357.497 g·mol^{−1}
- 3D model (JSmol): Interactive image
- SMILES: CCCCCn1cc(c2c1cccc2)Cc3ccc(c4c3cccc4)OC
- InChI: InChI=1S/C25H27NO/c1-3-4-9-16-26-18-20(22-11-7-8-13-24(22)26)17-19-14-15-25(27-2)23-12-6-5-10-21(19)23/h5-8,10-15,18H,3-4,9,16-17H2,1-2H3; Key:OTYBPWBZUDBUQS-UHFFFAOYSA-N

JWH-185 is a synthetic cannabinoid receptor ligand from the naphthoylindole family. It is the carbonyl-reduced derivative of related compound JWH-081. The binding affinity of JWH-185 for the CB_{1} receptor is reported as K_{i} = 17 ± 3 nM.

In the United States, all CB_{1} receptor agonists of the 3-(1-naphthylmethane)indole class such as JWH-185 are Schedule I Controlled Substances.

== See also ==
- JWH-081
- JWH-184
