= JWH-098 =

Chemical compound

Legal status
- Legal status: BR: Class F2 (Prohibited psychotropics); CA: Schedule II; DE: NpSG (Industrial and scientific use only); UK: Class B; US: Schedule I

Identifiers
- IUPAC name: 4-Methoxynaphthalen-1-yl-(1-pentyl-2-methylindol-3-yl)methanone
- CAS Number: 316189-74-9
- PubChem CID: 45272116
- ChemSpider: 24628229
- UNII: T27V33219F
- CompTox Dashboard (EPA): DTXSID80185501

Chemical and physical data
- Formula: C_{26}H_{27}NO_{2}
- Molar mass: 385.507 g·mol^{−1}
- 3D model (JSmol): Interactive image
- SMILES: CCCCCn(c1C)c2ccccc2c1C(=O)c(ccc3OC)c4ccccc34
- InChI: InChI=1S/C26H27NO2/c1-4-5-10-17-27-18(2)25(22-13-8-9-14-23(22)27)26(28)21-15-16-24(29-3)20-12-7-6-11-19(20)21/h6-9,11-16H,4-5,10,17H2,1-3H3; Key:CNTCHEBQQFICNR-UHFFFAOYSA-N

JWH-098 is a synthetic cannabinoid receptor agonist from the naphthoylindole family. It is the indole 2-methyl derivative of a closely related compound JWH-081, but has markedly different affinity for the CB_{1} and CB_{2} receptors. While JWH-081 is around tenfold selective for CB_{1} over CB_{2}, in JWH-098 this is reversed, and it is around four times weaker than JWH-081 at CB_{1} while being six times more potent at CB_{2}, giving it a slight selectivity for CB_{2} overall. This makes JWH-098 a good example of how methylation of the indole 2-position in the naphthoylindole series tends to increase CB_{2} affinity, but often at the expense of CB_{1} binding.

== Legal status ==
In the United States, all CB_{1} receptor agonists of the 3-(1-naphthoyl)indole class such as JWH-098 are Schedule I Controlled Substances.

JWH-098 is illegal in Russia, Sweden, and the UK, although it is unclear whether it has any history of human use.

== See also ==
- JWH-007
- JWH-081
