= JWH-309 =

Chemical compound

Legal status
- Legal status: CA: Schedule II; UK: Class B

Identifiers
- IUPAC name: naphthalen-1-yl-(5-naphthalen-1-yl-1-pentylpyrrol-3-yl)methanone
- CAS Number: 914458-42-7
- PubChem CID: 44418371
- ChemSpider: ID23277951
- UNII: 5LC7L6AM73
- CompTox Dashboard (EPA): DTXSID201016890

Chemical and physical data
- Formula: C_{30}H_{27}NO
- Molar mass: 417.552 g·mol^{−1}
- 3D model (JSmol): Interactive image
- SMILES: CCCCCN1C=C(C=C1C2=CC=CC3=CC=CC=C32)C(=O)C4=CC=CC5=CC=CC=C54
- InChI: InChI=1S/C30H27NO/c1-2-3-8-19-31-21-24(30(32)28-18-10-14-23-12-5-7-16-26(23)28)20-29(31)27-17-9-13-22-11-4-6-15-25(22)27/h4-7,9-18,20-21H,2-3,8,19H2,1H3; Key:WVISOUYKTUUDFW-UHFFFAOYSA-N

JWH-309 (naphthalen-1-yl-(5-naphthalen-1-yl-1-pentylpyrrol-3-yl)methanone) is a synthetic cannabinoid from the naphthoylpyrrole family which acts as an agonist of the CB_{1} (K_{i} = 41 ± 3nM) and CB_{2} (K_{i} = 49 ± 7nM) receptors, displaying a slight selectivity for the former. JWH-309 was first synthesized in 2006 by John W. Huffman and colleagues to examine the nature of ligand binding to the CB_{1} receptor.

== Legality ==
In the United States JWH-309 is not federally scheduled, although some states have passed legislation banning the sale, possession, and manufacture of JWH-309.

In Canada, JWH-309 and other naphthoylpyrrole-based cannabinoids are Schedule II controlled substances under the Controlled Drugs and Substances Act.

In the United Kingdom, JWH-309 and other naphthoylpyrrole-based cannabinoids are considered Class B drugs under the Misuse of Drugs Act 1971.

== See also ==
- List of JWH cannabinoids
- Synthetic cannabinoid
