= JWH-366 =

Chemical compound

Legal status
- Legal status: CA: Schedule II; UK: Class B

Identifiers
- IUPAC name: naphthalen-1-yl-(1-pentyl-5-pyridin-3-ylpyrrol-3-yl)methanone
- CAS Number: 914458-44-9
- PubChem CID: 44418373
- ChemSpider: 23277955
- CompTox Dashboard (EPA): DTXSID901337005

Chemical and physical data
- Formula: C_{25}H_{24}N_{2}O
- Molar mass: 368.480 g·mol^{−1}
- 3D model (JSmol): Interactive image
- SMILES: CCCCCN1C=C(C=C1C2=CN=CC=C2)C(=O)C3=CC=CC4=CC=CC=C43
- InChI: InChI=1S/C25H24N2O/c1-2-3-6-15-27-18-21(16-24(27)20-11-8-14-26-17-20)25(28)23-13-7-10-19-9-4-5-12-22(19)23/h4-5,7-14,16-18H,2-3,6,15H2,1H3; Key:MPQYTRCOFXNOTB-UHFFFAOYSA-N

JWH-366 (naphthalen-1-yl-(1-pentyl-5-pyridin-3-ylpyrrol-3-yl)methanone) is a synthetic cannabinoid from the naphthoylpyrrole family which acts as an agonist of the CB_{1} (K_{i} = 191 ± 12nM) and CB_{2} (K_{i} = 24 ± 1nM) receptors, with a strong (~8x) selectivity for the CB_{2} receptor over the CB_{1} receptor. JWH-366 was first synthesized in 2006 by John W. Huffman and colleagues to examine the nature of ligand binding to the CB_{1} receptor.

== Legality ==
In the United States JWH-366 is not federally scheduled, although some states have passed legislation banning the sale, possession, and manufacture of JWH-366.

In Canada, JWH-366 and other naphthoylpyrrole-based cannabinoids are Schedule II controlled substances under the Controlled Drugs and Substances Act.

In the United Kingdom, JWH-366 and other naphthoylpyrrole-based cannabinoids are considered Class B drugs under the Misuse of Drugs Act 1971.

== See also ==
- List of JWH cannabinoids
- Synthetic cannabinoid
