= C25H27N =

The molecular formula C_{25}H_{27}N (molar mass: 341.49 g/mol, exact mass: 341.2143 u) may refer to:

- JWH-184
- JWH-196
