= JWH-048 =

Chemical compound

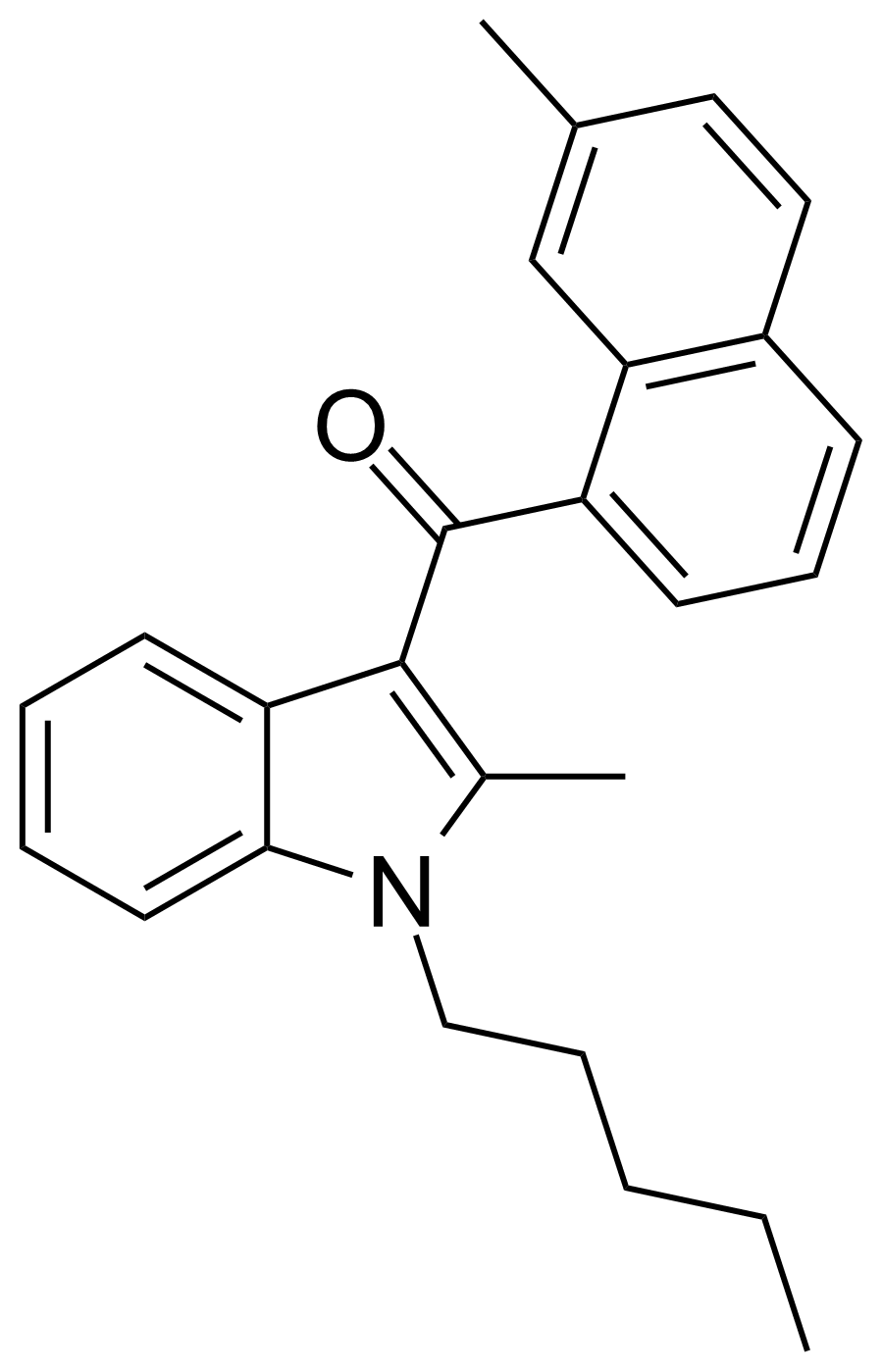

Legal status
- Legal status: DE: unscheduled; US: Schedule I

Identifiers
- IUPAC name: (1-Pentyl-2-methyl-1H-indol-3-yl)(7-methyl-1-naphthalenyl)methanone
- CAS Number: 316189-66-9
- PubChem CID: 11280135
- ChemSpider: 9455134
- UNII: ZLS6Q88UQ8

Chemical and physical data
- Formula: C_{26}H_{27}NO
- Molar mass: 369.508 g·mol^{−1}
- 3D model (JSmol): Interactive image
- SMILES: CCCCCN1C(=C(C2=CC=CC=C21)C(=O)C3=CC=CC4=C3C=C(C=C4)C)C
- InChI: InChI=1S/C26H27NO/c1-4-5-8-16-27-19(3)25(22-11-6-7-13-24(22)27)26(28)21-12-9-10-20-15-14-18(2)17-23(20)21/h6-7,9-15,17H,4-5,8,16H2,1-3H3; Key:HSGMJSSWGKDWNA-UHFFFAOYSA-N

JWH-048 is a selective cannabinoid ligand, with a bindining affinity of K_{i} = 0.5 ± 0.1 nM for the CB_{2} subtype, and more than 22 times selectivity over the CB_{1}.

In the United States, all CB_{1} receptor agonists of the 3-(1-naphthoyl)indole class such as JWH-048 are Schedule I Controlled Substances.

== See also ==
- JWH-015
- JWH-018
- JWH-019
- JWH-073
