= JWH-150 =

Chemical compound

Legal status
- Legal status: CA: Schedule II; UK: Class B

Identifiers
- IUPAC name: (1-butyl-5-phenylpyrrol-3-yl)-naphthalen-1-ylmethanone
- CAS Number: 914458-18-7
- PubChem CID: 44418303
- ChemSpider: 23277877
- CompTox Dashboard (EPA): DTXSID701337047

Chemical and physical data
- Formula: C_{25}H_{23}NO
- Molar mass: 353.465 g·mol^{−1}
- 3D model (JSmol): Interactive image
- SMILES: CCCCN1C=C(C=C1C2=CC=CC=C2)C(=O)C3=CC=CC4=CC=CC=C43
- InChI: InChI=1S/C25H23NO/c1-2-3-16-26-18-21(17-24(26)20-11-5-4-6-12-20)25(27)23-15-9-13-19-10-7-8-14-22(19)23/h4-15,17-18H,2-3,16H2,1H3; Key:PTIAQHRJOQEMCO-UHFFFAOYSA-N

JWH-150 ((1-butyl-5-phenylpyrrol-3-yl)-naphthalen-1-ylmethanone) is a synthetic cannabinoid from the naphthoylpyrrole family which acts as an agonist of the CB_{1} (K_{i} = 60 ± 1nM) and CB_{2} (K_{i} = 15 ± 2nM) receptors, with a moderate four-fold selectivity for the CB_{2} receptor. JWH-150 was first synthesized in 2006 by John W. Huffman and colleagues to examine the nature of ligand binding to the CB_{1} receptor.

== Legality ==
In the United States JWH-150 is not federally scheduled, although some states have passed legislation banning the sale, possession, and manufacture of JWH-150.

In Canada, JWH-150 and other naphthoylpyrrole-based cannabinoids are Schedule II controlled substances under the Controlled Drugs and Substances Act.

In the United Kingdom, JWH-150 and other naphthoylpyrrole-based cannabinoids are considered Class B drugs under the Misuse of Drugs Act 1971.

== See also ==
- List of JWH cannabinoids
- Synthetic cannabinoid
