= CHM-081 =

Chemical compound

Identifiers
- IUPAC name: [1-(cyclohexylmethyl)indol-3-yl]-(4-methoxynaphthalen-1-yl)methanone
- CAS Number: 1373876-34-6
- PubChem CID: 118796420
- ChemSpider: 29763715
- UNII: 77TK99424J
- CompTox Dashboard (EPA): DTXSID101017576

Chemical and physical data
- Formula: C_{27}H_{27}NO_{2}
- Molar mass: 397.518 g·mol^{−1}
- 3D model (JSmol): Interactive image
- SMILES: COC1=CC=C(C2=CC=CC=C21)C(=O)C3=CN(C4=CC=CC=C43)CC5CCCCC5
- InChI: InChI=1S/C27H27NO2/c1-30-26-16-15-23(20-11-5-6-13-22(20)26)27(29)24-18-28(17-19-9-3-2-4-10-19)25-14-8-7-12-21(24)25/h5-8,11-16,18-19H,2-4,9-10,17H2,1H3; Key:LMENRXZOUBANKQ-UHFFFAOYSA-N

CHM-081 (SGT-4) is a recreational designer drug which is classed as a synthetic cannabinoid. It is from the naphthoylindole family, being the 1-cyclohexylmethyl instead of 1-pentyl analogue of JWH-081, and produces cannabis-like effects. It has been identified as an ingredient in synthetic cannabis products in various countries including the USA and Australia.

== See also ==
- AB-CHMINACA
- CHM-018
- Org 28611
