= C24H36O2 =

The molecular formula C_{24}H_{36}O_{2} (molar mass: 356.54 g/mol, exact mass: 356.2715 u) may refer to:

- JWH-138
- JWH-359
- Nisinic acid
- 1'-Dimethyl-Δ9-THCH
