= NE-CHMIMO =

Chemical compound

Legal status
- Legal status: CA: Schedule II; DE: Anlage II (Authorized trade only, not prescriptible); UK: Class B; US: Schedule I; Illegal in Japan

Identifiers
- IUPAC name: [1-(Cyclohexylmethyl)-1H-indol-3-yl](naphthalen-1-yl)methanone
- CAS Number: 1373876-11-9
- PubChem CID: 139031057
- ChemSpider: 81407778
- UNII: 5FWB35TKQ2
- CompTox Dashboard (EPA): DTXSID401046437

Chemical and physical data
- Formula: C_{26}H_{25}NO
- Molar mass: 367.492 g·mol^{−1}
- 3D model (JSmol): Interactive image
- SMILES: O=C(c1cccc2ccccc12)c3cn(CC4CCCCC4)c5ccccc35
- InChI: InChI=1S/C26H25NO/c28-26(23-15-8-12-20-11-4-5-13-21(20)23)24-18-27(17-19-9-2-1-3-10-19)25-16-7-6-14-22(24)25/h4-8,11-16,18-19H,1-3,9-10,17H2; Key:HGJYPIZWMHHQKS-UHFFFAOYSA-N

NE-CHMIMO (CHM-018) is an indole-based synthetic cannabinoid that is presumed to be a potent agonist of the CB_{1} receptor and has been sold online as a designer drug. NE-CHMIMO is the 1-cyclohexylmethyl (instead of 1-pentyl) analogue of the first-generation synthetic cannabinoid JWH-018. The corresponding cyclohexylmethyl derivative of JWH-081 had also been reported several months earlier.

== Legal status ==
In the United States, all CB_{1} receptor agonists of the 3-(1-naphthoyl)indole class such as NE-CHMIMO are Schedule I Controlled Substances.

NE-CHMIMO is a controlled substance in Japan as of November 2019.

== See also ==
- AB-CHMINACA
- ADB-CHMINACA
- APP-CHMINACA
- CHM-081
- FUB-018
- MDMB-CHMICA
- MDMB-CHMINACA
