= JWH-368 =

Chemical compound

Legal status
- Legal status: CA: Schedule II; UK: Class B

Identifiers
- IUPAC name: [5-(3-Fluorophenyl)-1-pentylpyrrol-3-yl]-naphthalen-1-ylmethanone
- CAS Number: 914458-31-4
- PubChem CID: 44418331
- ChemSpider: 23277909
- UNII: HYS2YS4WNM
- CompTox Dashboard (EPA): DTXSID60658824

Chemical and physical data
- Formula: C_{26}H_{24}FNO
- Molar mass: 385.482 g·mol^{−1}
- 3D model (JSmol): Interactive image
- SMILES: CCCCCN1C=C(C=C1C2=CC(=CC=C2)F)C(=O)C3=CC=CC4=CC=CC=C43
- InChI: InChI=1S/C26H24FNO/c1-2-3-6-15-28-18-21(17-25(28)20-11-7-12-22(27)16-20)26(29)24-14-8-10-19-9-4-5-13-23(19)24/h4-5,7-14,16-18H,2-3,6,15H2,1H3; Key:OCOICOMCAJNSCA-UHFFFAOYSA-N

JWH-368 ([5-(3-Fluorophenyl)-1-pentylpyrrol-3-yl]-naphthalen-1-ylmethanone) is a synthetic cannabinoid from the naphthoylpyrrole family which acts as an agonist of the CB_{1} (K_{i} = 16 ± 1nM) and CB_{2} (K_{i} = 9.1 ± 0.7nM) receptors, binding ~1.76 times stronger to the CB_{2} receptor than to the CB_{1} receptor. JWH-368 was first synthesized in 2006 by John W. Huffman and colleagues to examine the nature of ligand binding to the CB_{1} receptor.

== Legality ==
In the United States JWH-368 is not federally scheduled, although some states have passed legislation banning the sale, possession, and manufacture of JWH-368.

In Canada, JWH-368 and other naphthoylpyrrole-based cannabinoids are Schedule II controlled substances under the Controlled Drugs and Substances Act.

In the United Kingdom, JWH-368 and other naphthoylpyrrole-based cannabinoids are considered Class B drugs under the Misuse of Drugs Act 1971.

== See also ==
- List of JWH cannabinoids
- Synthetic cannabinoid
