= C21H23N3O2 =

The molecular formula C_{21}H_{23}N_{3}O_{2} (molar mass: 349.426 g/mol, exact mass: 349.1790 u) may refer to:

- MDA-19
- Panobinostat
