= C27H27NO =

The molecular formula C_{27}H_{27}NO (molar mass: 381.519 g/mol) may refer to:

- JWH-147
- JWH-370
