= Mepirapim =

Chemical compound

Legal status
- Legal status: CA: Schedule II; DE: NpSG (Industrial and scientific use only); UK: Class B

Identifiers
- IUPAC name: (4-methylpiperazin-1-yl)-(1-pentylindol-3-yl)methanone
- CAS Number: 2365542-29-4
- PubChem CID: 101896603
- ChemSpider: 52085735
- UNII: W6OZW1T05K
- CompTox Dashboard (EPA): DTXSID901032510

Chemical and physical data
- Formula: C_{19}H_{27}N_{3}O
- Molar mass: 313.445 g·mol^{−1}
- 3D model (JSmol): Interactive image
- SMILES: CCCCCN1C=C(C2=CC=CC=C21)C(=O)N3CCN(CC3)C
- InChI: InChI=1S/C19H27N3O/c1-3-4-7-10-22-15-17(16-8-5-6-9-18(16)22)19(23)21-13-11-20(2)12-14-21/h5-6,8-9,15H,3-4,7,10-14H2,1-2H3; Key:IUEFFEOHJKCBPF-UHFFFAOYSA-N

MEPIRAPIM is an indole-based cannabinoid which differs from JWH-018 by having a 4-methylpiperazine group in place of the naphthyl group and has been used as an active ingredient in synthetic cannabis products. It was first identified in Japan in 2013, alongside FUBIMINA. MEPIRAPIM acts as a T-type calcium channel inhibitor and is only minimally active at the CB1 receptor.

== Legality ==
Sweden's public health agency suggested to classify MEPIRAPIM as hazardous substance on November 10, 2014.

== See also ==
- APICA
- AM-2201
- JWH-073
- JWH-250
- JWH-200
- List of JWH cannabinoids
- List of AM cannabinoids
- THJ-2201
