= JWH-372 =

Chemical compound

Legal status
- Legal status: CA: Schedule II; UK: Class B

Identifiers
- IUPAC name: naphthalen-1-yl-[1-pentyl-5-[2-(trifluoromethyl)phenyl]pyrrol-3-yl]methanone
- CAS Number: 914458-28-9
- PubChem CID: 44418325
- ChemSpider: 23277903
- CompTox Dashboard (EPA): DTXSID401337000

Chemical and physical data
- Formula: C_{27}H_{24}F_{3}NO
- Molar mass: 435.490 g·mol^{−1}
- 3D model (JSmol): Interactive image
- SMILES: CCCCCN1C=C(C=C1C2=CC=CC=C2C(F)(F)F)C(=O)C3=CC=CC4=CC=CC=C43
- InChI: InChI=1S/C27H24F3NO/c1-2-3-8-16-31-18-20(17-25(31)23-13-6-7-15-24(23)27(28,29)30)26(32)22-14-9-11-19-10-4-5-12-21(19)22/h4-7,9-15,17-18H,2-3,8,16H2,1H3; Key:CYPUIQJYGVOHMM-UHFFFAOYSA-N

JWH-372 (naphthalen-1-yl-[1-pentyl-5-[2-(trifluoromethyl)phenyl]pyrrol-3-yl]methanone) is a synthetic cannabinoid from the naphthoylpyrrole family which acts as a potent and selective agonist of the CB_{2} receptor. JWH-372 binds approximately 9 times stronger to the CB_{2} receptor (K_{i} = 8.2 ± 0.2nM) than the CB_{1} receptor (K_{i} = 77 ± 2nM). The selectivity of JWH-372 for the CB_{2} receptor is likely due to the electron-withdrawing character of the trifluoromethyl group rather than steric effects, as the o-methyl compound JWH-370 was only mildly selective for the CB_{2} receptor (CB_{1} K_{i} = 5.6 ± 0.4nM, CB_{2} K_{i} = 4.0 ± 0.5nM).

== Legality ==
In the United States JWH-372 is not federally scheduled, although some states have passed legislation banning the sale, possession, and manufacture of JWH-372.

In Canada, JWH-372 and other naphthoylpyrrole-based cannabinoids are Schedule II controlled substances under the Controlled Drugs and Substances Act.

In the United Kingdom, JWH-372 and other naphthoylpyrrole-based cannabinoids are considered Class B drugs under the Misuse of Drugs Act 1971.

== See also ==
- List of JWH cannabinoids
- Synthetic cannabinoid
