= JWH-161 =

Chemical

Identifiers
- IUPAC name: (4aR,13bR)-2,5,5-trimethyl-8-pentyl-3,4,4a,5,8,13b-hexahydroisochromeno[3,4-b]carbazol-13-ol
- CAS Number: 1349418-89-8
- PubChem CID: 10431286
- ChemSpider: 8606713
- CompTox Dashboard (EPA): DTXSID201029576

Chemical and physical data
- Formula: C_{27}H_{33}NO_{2}
- Molar mass: 403.566 g·mol^{−1}
- 3D model (JSmol): Interactive image
- SMILES: Oc3c5c1ccccc1n(c5cc2OC([C@@H]4CC/C(=C\[C@H]4c23)C)(C)C)CCCCC
- InChI: InChI=1S/C27H33NO2/c1-5-6-9-14-28-21-11-8-7-10-18(21)24-22(28)16-23-25(26(24)29)19-15-17(2)12-13-20(19)27(3,4)30-23/h7-8,10-11,15-16,19-20,29H,5-6,9,12-14H2,1-4H3/t19-,20-/m1/s1; Key:VDJUAFPNHZRTNL-WOJBJXKFSA-N

JWH-161 is a cannabinoid derivative that was designed by Dr John W. Huffman's team as a hybrid between the dibenzopyran "classical" cannabinoid drugs and the novel indole derivatives, in an attempt to unravel the differences in their binding modes to the CB_{1} receptor. While retaining structural elements from both families, JWH-161 has a CB_{1} K_{i} of 19.0nM, although it was found to be slightly weaker than THC in animal tests.
