= JWH-373 =

Chemical compound

Legal status
- Legal status: CA: Schedule II; UK: Class B

Identifiers
- IUPAC name: [5-(2-butylphenyl)-1-pentylpyrrol-3-yl]-naphthalen-1-ylmethanone
- CAS Number: 914458-37-0
- PubChem CID: 44418316
- ChemSpider: 23277894
- CompTox Dashboard (EPA): DTXSID101336996

Chemical and physical data
- Formula: C_{30}H_{33}NO
- Molar mass: 423.600 g·mol^{−1}
- 3D model (JSmol): Interactive image
- SMILES: O=C(C=1C=C(C=2C=CC(=CC2)CCCC)N(C1)CCCCC)C3=CC=CC=4C=CC=CC43
- InChI: InChI=1S/C30H33NO/c1-3-5-11-20-31-22-25(21-29(31)27-18-10-8-15-24(27)13-6-4-2)30(32)28-19-12-16-23-14-7-9-17-26(23)28/h7-10,12,14-19,21-22H,3-6,11,13,20H2,1-2H3; Key:LDGBUSJKRUNXPK-UHFFFAOYSA-N

JWH-373 ([5-(2-butylphenyl)-1-pentylpyrrol-3-yl]-naphthalen-1-ylmethanone) is a synthetic cannabinoid from the naphthoylpyrrole family which acts as an agonist of the CB_{1} (K_{i} = 60 ± 3nM) and CB_{2} (K_{i} = 69 ± 2nM) receptors, with a slight selectivity for the former. JWH-373 was first synthesized in 2006 by John W. Huffman and colleagues to examine the nature of ligand binding to the CB_{1} receptor.

== Legality ==
In the United States JWH-373 is not federally scheduled, although some states have passed legislation banning the sale, possession, and manufacture of JWH-373.

In Canada, JWH-373 and other naphthoylpyrrole-based cannabinoids are Schedule II controlled substances under the Controlled Drugs and Substances Act.

In the United Kingdom, JWH-373 and other naphthoylpyrrole-based cannabinoids are considered Class B drugs under the Misuse of Drugs Act 1971.

== See also ==
- List of JWH cannabinoids
- Synthetic cannabinoid
