= JWH-371 =

Chemical compound

Legal status
- Legal status: CA: Schedule II; UK: Class B

Identifiers
- IUPAC name: [5-(4-butylphenyl)-1-pentylpyrrol-3-yl]-naphthalen-1-ylmethanone
- CAS Number: 914458-37-0
- PubChem CID: 44418349
- ChemSpider: 23277927
- ChEMBL: ChEMBL219580
- CompTox Dashboard (EPA): DTXSID801337002

Chemical and physical data
- Formula: C_{30}H_{33}NO
- Molar mass: 423.600 g·mol^{−1}
- 3D model (JSmol): Interactive image
- SMILES: CCCCCN1C=C(C=C1C2=CC=C(C=C2)CCCC)C(=O)C3=CC=CC4=CC=CC=C43
- InChI: InChI=1S/C30H33NO/c1-3-5-9-20-31-22-26(21-29(31)25-18-16-23(17-19-25)11-6-4-2)30(32)28-15-10-13-24-12-7-8-14-27(24)28/h7-8,10,12-19,21-22H,3-6,9,11,20H2,1-2H3; Key:PKNGYYSGLHBRGC-UHFFFAOYSA-N

JWH-371 ([5-(4-butylphenyl)-1-pentylpyrrol-3-yl]-naphthalen-1-ylmethanone) is a synthetic cannabinoid from the naphthoylpyrrole family which acts as an agonist of the CB_{1} (K_{i} = 42 ± 1nM) and CB_{2} (K_{i} = 64 ± 2nM) receptors, binding ~1.5 times stronger to the CB_{1} receptor than the CB_{2} receptor. JWH-371 was first synthesized in 2006 by John W. Huffman and colleagues to examine the nature of ligand binding to the CB_{1} receptor.

== Legality ==
In the United States JWH-371 is not federally scheduled, although some states have passed legislation banning the sale, possession, and manufacture of JWH-371.

In Canada, JWH-371 and other naphthoylpyrrole-based cannabinoids are Schedule II controlled substances under the Controlled Drugs and Substances Act.

In the United Kingdom, JWH-371 and other naphthoylpyrrole-based cannabinoids are considered Class B drugs under the Misuse of Drugs Act 1971.

== See also ==
- List of JWH cannabinoids
- Synthetic cannabinoid
