= JWH-047 =

Chemical compound

Legal status
- Legal status: DE: unscheduled; US: Schedule I

Identifiers
- IUPAC name: (1-Butyl-2-methyl-1H-indol-3-yl)(7-methyl-1-naphthalenyl)methanone
- CAS Number: 316189-65-8
- ChemSpider: 35303438
- UNII: 8DQF9PUT4F

Chemical and physical data
- Formula: C_{25}H_{25}NO
- Molar mass: 355.481 g·mol^{−1}
- 3D model (JSmol): Interactive image
- SMILES: CCCCn1c(c(c2c1cccc2)C(=O)c3cccc4c3cc(cc4)C)C
- InChI: InChI=1S/C25H25NO/c1-4-5-15-26-18(3)24(21-10-6-7-12-23(21)26)25(27)20-11-8-9-19-14-13-17(2)16-22(19)20/h6-14,16H,4-5,15H2,1-3H3; Key:RQWLYQGWFKBOIY-UHFFFAOYSA-N

JWH-047 is a selective cannabinoid ligand that binds to both CB_{1} and CB_{2}. It has a bindining affinity of K_{i} = 0.9 nM for the CB_{2} subtype, and more than 65 times selectivity over the CB_{1}.

In the United States, all CB_{1} receptor agonists of the 3-(1-naphthoyl)indole class such as JWH-047 are Schedule I Controlled Substances.

== See also ==
- JWH-015
- JWH-018
- JWH-019
- JWH-073
