= JWH-367 =

Chemical compound

Legal status
- Legal status: CA: Schedule II; UK: Class B

Identifiers
- IUPAC name: [5-(3-methoxyphenyl)-1-pentylpyrrol-3-yl]-naphthalen-1-ylmethanone
- CAS Number: 914458-30-3
- PubChem CID: 44418330
- ChemSpider: 23277908

Chemical and physical data
- Formula: C_{27}H_{27}NO_{2}
- Molar mass: 397.518 g·mol^{−1}
- 3D model (JSmol): Interactive image
- SMILES: CCCCCN1C=C(C=C1C2=CC(=CC=C2)OC)C(=O)C3=CC=CC4=CC=CC=C43
- InChI: InChI=1S/C27H27NO2/c1-3-4-7-16-28-19-22(18-26(28)21-12-8-13-23(17-21)30-2)27(29)25-15-9-11-20-10-5-6-14-24(20)25/h5-6,8-15,17-19H,3-4,7,16H2,1-2H3; Key:RGYBGMOZXHKLRI-UHFFFAOYSA-N

JWH-367 ([5-(3-methoxyphenyl)-1-pentylpyrrol-3-yl]-naphthalen-1-ylmethanone) is a synthetic cannabinoid from the naphthoylpyrrole family which acts as an agonist of the CB_{1} (K_{i} = 53 ± 2nM) and CB_{2} (K_{i} = 23 ± 1nM) receptors, binding ~2.3 times stronger to the CB_{2} receptor than to the CB_{1} receptor. JWH-367 was first synthesized in 2006 by John W. Huffman and colleagues to examine the nature of ligand binding to the CB_{1} receptor.

== Legality ==
In the United States JWH-367 is not federally scheduled, although some states have passed legislation banning the sale, possession, and manufacture of JWH-367.

In Canada, JWH-367 and other naphthoylpyrrole-based cannabinoids are Schedule II controlled substances under the Controlled Drugs and Substances Act.

In the United Kingdom, JWH-367 and other naphthoylpyrrole-based cannabinoids are considered Class B drugs under the Misuse of Drugs Act 1971.

== See also ==
- List of JWH cannabinoids
- Synthetic cannabinoid
