= BZO-CHMOXIZID =

Chemical compound

Legal status
- Legal status: BR: Class F2 (Prohibited psychotropics)

Identifiers
- IUPAC name: N′-[(3Z)-1-(Cyclohexylmethyl)-2-oxo-1,2-dihydro-3H-indol-3-ylidene]benzohydrazide
- CAS Number: 1048973-67-6
- PubChem CID: 135881485
- ChemSpider: 24715499
- UNII: W4JEN9G47K
- ChEMBL: ChEMBL514565

Chemical and physical data
- Formula: C_{22}H_{23}N_{3}O_{2}
- Molar mass: 361.445 g·mol^{−1}
- 3D model (JSmol): Interactive image
- SMILES: O=C(C1=CC=CC=C1)N/N=C(C2=O)/C3=CC=CC=C3N2CC4CCCCC4
- InChI: InChI=1S/C22H23N3O2/c26-21(17-11-5-2-6-12-17)24-23-20-18-13-7-8-14-19(18)25(22(20)27)15-16-9-3-1-4-10-16/h2,5-8,11-14,16H,1,3-4,9-10,15H2,(H,24,26)/b23-20-; Key:HTPDZRIIOLCPPS-ATJXCDBQSA-N

BZO-CHMOXIZID (CHM-MDA-19) is a synthetic cannabinoid compound first reported in 2008 in the same series as the better known derivative MDA-19. It started to be widely sold as an ingredient in grey-market synthetic cannabis blends in 2021 following the introduction of legislation in China which for the first time introduced general controls on various classes of synthetic cannabinoids, but did not include the group to which MDA-19 and BZO-CHMOXIZID belong. While BZO-CHMOXIZID is the most potent compound at CB_{1} from this so-called "OXAZID" series, it is still markedly CB_{2} selective and of relatively low potency at CB_{1}, with an EC_{50} of 84.6 nM at CB_{1} compared to 2.21 nM at CB_{2}.

== Legality ==
In the United States, As of October 20, 2024 BZO-CHMOXIZID is legal at the federal level, but may be considered illegal if intended for human consumption under the federal analogue act.

North Dakota has placed BZO-CHOMXIZID (CHM-MDA-19) (along with BZO-HEXOXIZID (MDA-19), BZO-POXIZID (Pentyl MDA-19), 5F-BZO-POXIZID (5F-MDA-19) and BZO-4en-POXIZID (4en-pentyl MDA-19) into Schedule I on 04/27/23.

In China, the May 2021 ban on specific synthetic cannabinoid core classes does not include the class of cannabinoids BZO-CHMOXIZID belongs to.
