= Dexanabinol =

Chemical compound

Clinical data
- ATC code: none

Identifiers
- IUPAC name: (6aS,10aS)-9-(Hydroxymethyl)-6,6-dimethyl-3-(2-methyloctan-2-yl)-6a,7,10,10a-tetrahydrobenzo[c]chromen-1-ol
- CAS Number: 112924-45-5
- PubChem CID: 107778
- DrugBank: DB06444
- ChemSpider: 96934
- UNII: R6VT8U5372
- ChEMBL: ChEMBL334533
- CompTox Dashboard (EPA): DTXSID40150235
- ECHA InfoCard: 100.201.022

Chemical and physical data
- Formula: C_{25}H_{38}O_{3}
- Molar mass: 386.576 g·mol^{−1}
- 3D model (JSmol): Interactive image
- SMILES: Oc2cc(cc1OC([C@H]3C/C=C(\C[C@@H]3c12)CO)(C)C)C(C)(C)CCCCCC
- InChI: InChI=1S/C25H38O3/c1-6-7-8-9-12-24(2,3)18-14-21(27)23-19-13-17(16-26)10-11-20(19)25(4,5)28-22(23)15-18/h10,14-15,19-20,26-27H,6-9,11-13,16H2,1-5H3/t19-,20-/m0/s1; Key:SSQJFGMEZBFMNV-PMACEKPBSA-N

Dexanabinol (HU-211 or ETS2101) is a synthetic cannabinoid derivative in development by e-Therapeutics plc. It is the "unnatural" enantiomer of the potent cannabinoid agonist HU-210. Unlike other cannabinoid derivatives, HU-211 does not act as a cannabinoid receptor agonist, but instead as an NMDA antagonist. It therefore does not produce cannabis-like effects, but is anticonvulsant and neuroprotective, and is widely used in scientific research as well as currently being studied for applications such as treating head injury, stroke, or cancer. It was shown to be safe in clinical trials and is currently undergoing Phase I trials for the treatment of brain cancer and advanced solid tumors.

== Clinical trials ==
Dexanabinol has been studied in IV administration and oral dosing. e-Therapeutics is evaluating the compound in clinical trials for brain and solid cancers. Phase II studies are planned based on the results of the current trials.

A phase 1b study for hepatocellular carcinoma and pancreatic cancer was started in 2015.

== Legal status ==
HU-211 is not listed in the schedules set out by the United Nations' Single Convention on Narcotic Drugs from 1961 nor their Convention on Psychotropic Substances from 1971, so the signatory countries to these international drug control treaties are not required by said treaties to control HU-211.

=== United States ===
HU-211 is not listed in the list of scheduled controlled substances in the USA. It is therefore not scheduled at the federal level in the United States, but it is possible that HU-211 could legally be considered an analog of Delta-8-THC (one of the THC isomers which is in Schedule I under the designation of "Tetrahydrocannabinols"), and therefore sales or possession could potentially be prosecuted under the Federal Analogue Act.

HU-211 is a Schedule I controlled substance in Alabama.

HU-211 is a Schedule I controlled substance in the state of Florida making it illegal to buy, sell, or possess in Florida.

Effective January 1, 2016, HU-211 is a regulated drug in Vermont designated as a "Hallucinogenic Drug."

== See also ==
- Etonitazene
- Norbinaltorphimine
