= JWH-364 =

Chemical compound

Legal status
- Legal status: CA: Schedule II; UK: Class B

Identifiers
- IUPAC name: [5-(4-Ethylphenyl)-1-pentyl-1H-pyrrol-3-yl](1-naphthyl)methanone
- CAS Number: 914458-36-9
- PubChem CID: 44418348
- ChemSpider: 23277926
- CompTox Dashboard (EPA): DTXSID001337008

Chemical and physical data
- Formula: C_{28}H_{29}NO
- Molar mass: 395.546 g·mol^{−1}
- 3D model (JSmol): Interactive image
- SMILES: CCCCCN1C=C(C=C1C2=CC=C(C=C2)CC)C(=O)C3=CC=CC4=CC=CC=C43
- InChI: InChI=1S/C28H29NO/c1-3-5-8-18-29-20-24(19-27(29)23-16-14-21(4-2)15-17-23)28(30)26-13-9-11-22-10-6-7-12-25(22)26/h6-7,9-17,19-20H,3-5,8,18H2,1-2H3; Key:VJWBAPGRMUZBEH-UHFFFAOYSA-N

JWH-364 ([5-(4-Ethylphenyl)-1-pentyl-1H-pyrrol-3-yl](1-naphthyl)methanone) is a synthetic cannabinoid from the naphthoylpyrrole family which acts as an agonist of the CB_{1} (K_{i} = 34 ± 3nM) and CB_{2} (K_{i} = 29 ± 1nM) receptors, with a slight selectivity for the latter. JWH-364 was first synthesized in 2006 by John W. Huffman and colleagues to examine the nature of ligand binding to the CB_{1} receptor.

== Legality ==
In the United States JWH-364 is not federally scheduled, although some states have passed legislation banning the sale, possession, and manufacture of JWH-364.

In Canada, JWH-364 and other naphthoylpyrrole-based cannabinoids are Schedule II controlled substances under the Controlled Drugs and Substances Act.

In the United Kingdom, JWH-364 and other naphthoylpyrrole-based cannabinoids are considered Class B drugs under the Misuse of Drugs Act 1971.

== See also ==
- List of JWH cannabinoids
- Synthetic cannabinoid
