= JWH-369 =

Chemical compound

Legal status
- Legal status: CA: Schedule II; UK: Class B

Identifiers
- IUPAC name: (5-(2-chlorophenyl)-1-pentyl-1H-pyrrol-3-yl)(naphthalen-1-yl)methanone
- CAS Number: 914458-27-8
- PubChem CID: 16049784
- ChemSpider: 13178179
- UNII: 2LM4LL393Y
- CompTox Dashboard (EPA): DTXSID901016889

Chemical and physical data
- Formula: C_{26}H_{24}ClNO
- Molar mass: 401.93 g·mol^{−1}
- 3D model (JSmol): Interactive image
- SMILES: O=C(C=1C=C(C=2C=CC=CC2Cl)N(C1)CCCCC)C3=CC=CC=4C=CC=CC43
- InChI: InChI=1S/C26H24ClNO/c1-2-3-8-16-28-18-20(17-25(28)23-13-6-7-15-24(23)27)26(29)22-14-9-11-19-10-4-5-12-21(19)22/h4-7,9-15,17-18H,2-3,8,16H2,1H3; Key:SUELCWQJMQQCTF-UHFFFAOYSA-N

JWH-369 ((5-(2-chlorophenyl)-1-pentyl-1H-pyrrol-3-yl)(naphthalen-1-yl)methanone) is a synthetic cannabinoid from the naphthoylpyrrole family which acts as a potent agonist of the CB_{1} (K_{i} = 7.9 ± 0.4nM) and CB_{2} (K_{i} = 5.2 ± 0.3nM) receptors, with a slight selectivity for the latter. JWH-369 was first synthesized in 2006 by John W. Huffman and colleagues to examine the nature of ligand binding to the CB_{1} receptor.

== Legality ==
In the United States, JWH-369 is not federally scheduled, although some states have passed legislation banning the sale, possession, and manufacture of JWH-369.

In Canada, JWH-369 and other naphthoylpyrrole-based cannabinoids are Schedule II controlled substances under the Controlled Drugs and Substances Act.

In the United Kingdom, JWH-369 and other naphthoylpyrrole-based cannabinoids are considered Class B drugs under the Misuse of Drugs Act 1971.
