= Δ8-THC-DMH =

Clinical data
- Trade names: Δ^{8}-THC-1',1'-DMH

Identifiers
- IUPAC name: (6aR,10aR)-6,6,9-trimethyl-3-(2-methyloctan-2-yl)-6a,7,10,10a-tetrahydrobenzo[c]chromen-1-ol
- CAS Number: 61597-27-1
- PubChem CID: 24096428

Chemical and physical data
- Formula: C_{25}H_{38}O_{2}
- Molar mass: 370.577 g·mol^{−1}
- 3D model (JSmol): Interactive image
- SMILES: CCCCCCC(C)(C)C1=CC(=C2[C@@H]3CC(=CC[C@H]3C(OC2=C1)(C)C)C)O
- InChI: InChI=1S/C25H38O2/c1-7-8-9-10-13-24(3,4)18-15-21(26)23-19-14-17(2)11-12-20(19)25(5,6)27-22(23)16-18/h11,15-16,19-20,26H,7-10,12-14H2,1-6H3/t19-,20-/m1/s1; Key:PJPBVOAEXHKPAB-WOJBJXKFSA-N

Δ8-THC-DMH

Clinical data
- Trade names: Δ^{8}-THC-1',2'-DMH

Identifiers
- IUPAC name: (6aR,10aR)-6,6,9-trimethyl-3-(3-methyloctan-2-yl)-6a,7,10,10a-tetrahydrobenzo[c]chromen-1-ol
- CAS Number: 24359-49-7
- PubChem CID: 24066921

Chemical and physical data
- Formula: C_{25}H_{38}O_{2}
- Molar mass: 370.577 g·mol^{−1}
- 3D model (JSmol): Interactive image
- SMILES: CCCCCC(C)C(C)C1=CC(=C2[C@@H]3CC(=CC[C@H]3C(OC2=C1)(C)C)C)O
- InChI: InChI=1S/C25H38O2/c1-7-8-9-10-17(3)18(4)19-14-22(26)24-20-13-16(2)11-12-21(20)25(5,6)27-23(24)15-19/h11,14-15,17-18,20-21,26H,7-10,12-13H2,1-6H3/t17?,18?,20-,21-/m1/s1; Key:XAUNJOUEWQWLCP-OWQMCBFZSA-N

Δ^{8}-THC-DMH (Δ^{8}-THC-dimethylheptyl) is a drug that is a cannabinoid agonist, related to Δ^{8}-THCP but with two methyl groups substituted onto the heptyl side chain. It has two positional isomers, Δ^{8}-THC-1',1'-DMH and Δ^{8}-THC-1',2'-DMH, and sources do not always clearly distinguish which is referred to, though older research generally used Δ^{8}-THC-1',2'-DMH while Δ^{8}-THC-1',1'-DMH has been more commonly used in recent years. Both compounds are potent, long-lasting cannabinoid agonists with a substantially higher potency but delayed onset of effects compared to THC, producing sedation, analgesia, hypotension and typical cannabinoid psychoactive effects. Δ^{8}-THC-1',2'-DMH has the methyl groups added at the 1' and 2' positions of the heptyl side chain resulting in two stereogenic centres and four enantiomers which differ significantly in potency. Much of the early research used a racemic mix of all four enantiomers, though it was later established that (1'S,2'R)-Δ8-THC-1',2'-DMH is the most active enantiomer, and enantiopure synthetic routes were subsequently developed. Δ^{8}-THC-1',1'-DMH on the other hand has both methyl groups added to the 1' position of the heptyl side chain and so has only a single side chain enantiomer, which is slightly less potent than the most active (1'S,2'R) enantiomer of Δ8-THC-1',2'-DMH, but is substantially stronger than the racemic mixture used in the early research. A large number of derivatives of Δ^{8}-THC-DMH are known, many of which have been widely used in scientific research, and these compounds have rarely been encountered as designer drugs, though the very long duration of action and unfavorable side effect profile make them less favored compared to other related compounds.

Structure of (1'S,2'R)-Δ^{8}-THC-1',2'-DMH, the most active enantiomer

== See also ==
- 1'-Dimethyl-Δ9-THCH
- Ajulemic acid
- CBD-DMH
- DMHP
- HU-210
- JWH-057
