= JWH-359 =

Chemical compound

Identifiers
- IUPAC name: (6aR,10aR)- 1-Methoxy- 6,6,9-trimethyl- 3-[(2R)-1,1,2-trimethylbutyl]- 6a,7,10,10a-tetrahydrobenzo[c]chromene
- PubChem CID: 57458933
- ChemSpider: 35303437
- UNII: 4NHS962LCE
- CompTox Dashboard (EPA): DTXSID201028166

Chemical and physical data
- Formula: C_{24}H_{36}O_{2}
- Molar mass: 356.550 g·mol^{−1}
- 3D model (JSmol): Interactive image
- SMILES: C[C@H](CC)C(C)(C)c1cc2OC(C)(C)[C@@H]3CC=C(C)C[C@H]3c2c(OC)c1
- InChI: InChI=1S/C24H36O2/c1-9-16(3)23(4,5)17-13-20(25-8)22-18-12-15(2)10-11-19(18)24(6,7)26-21(22)14-17/h10,13-14,16,18-19H,9,11-12H2,1-8H3/t16-,18-,19-/m1/s1; Key:BDJRWUBZMGSKHL-BHIYHBOVSA-N

JWH-359 is a dibenzopyran "classical" cannabinoid drug, which is a potent and selective CB_{2} receptor agonist, with a K_{i} of 13.0 nM and selectivity of around 220 times for CB_{2} over CB_{1} receptors. It is related to other dibenzopyran CB_{2} agonists such as JWH-133 and L-759,656 but with a chiral side chain which has made it useful for mapping the shape of the CB_{2} binding site. It was discovered by, and named after, John W. Huffman.
