= JWH-365 =

Chemical compound

Legal status
- Legal status: CA: Schedule II; UK: Class B

Identifiers
- IUPAC name: (5-(2-Ethylphenyl)-1-pentyl-1H-pyrrol-3-yl)(naphthalen-1-yl)methanone
- CAS Number: 914458-23-4
- PubChem CID: 44418313
- ChemSpider: 23277890
- CompTox Dashboard (EPA): DTXSID301337007

Chemical and physical data
- Formula: C_{28}H_{29}NO
- Molar mass: 395.546 g·mol^{−1}
- 3D model (JSmol): Interactive image
- SMILES: CCCCCN1C=C(C=C1C2=CC=CC=C2CC)C(=O)C3=CC=CC4=CC=CC=C43
- InChI: InChI=1S/C28H29NO/c1-3-5-10-18-29-20-23(19-27(29)25-16-9-6-12-21(25)4-2)28(30)26-17-11-14-22-13-7-8-15-24(22)26/h6-9,11-17,19-20H,3-5,10,18H2,1-2H3; Key:SNWJCZXZSGPAJM-UHFFFAOYSA-N

JWH-365 ((5-(2-Ethylphenyl)-1-pentyl-1H-pyrrol-3-yl)(naphthalen-1-yl)methanone) is a synthetic cannabinoid from the naphthoylpyrrole family which acts as an agonist of the CB_{1} (K_{i} = 17 ± 1nM) and CB_{2} (K_{i} = 3.4 ± 0.2nM) receptors, with a strong (~5x) selectivity for the CB_{2} receptor over the CB_{1} receptor. JWH-365 was first synthesized in 2006 by John W. Huffman and colleagues to examine the nature of ligand binding to the CB_{1} receptor.

== Legality ==
In the United States JWH-365 is not federally scheduled, although some states have passed legislation banning the sale, possession, and manufacture of JWH-365.

In Canada, JWH-365 and other naphthoylpyrrole-based cannabinoids are Schedule II controlled substances under the Controlled Drugs and Substances Act.

In the United Kingdom, JWH-365 and other naphthoylpyrrole-based cannabinoids are considered Class B drugs under the Misuse of Drugs Act 1971.

== See also ==
- List of JWH cannabinoids
- Synthetic cannabinoid
