= JWH-146 =

Chemical compound

Legal status
- Legal status: CA: Schedule II; UK: Class B

Identifiers
- IUPAC name: (1-heptyl-5-phenyl-1H-pyrrol-3-yl)-1-naphthalenyl-methanone
- CAS Number: 914458-21-2
- PubChem CID: 44418308
- ChemSpider: 23277883
- UNII: 5446SVK6LH
- ChEMBL: ChEMBL219970
- CompTox Dashboard (EPA): DTXSID201016888

Chemical and physical data
- Formula: C_{28}H_{29}NO
- Molar mass: 395.546 g·mol^{−1}
- 3D model (JSmol): Interactive image
- SMILES: O=C(C1=CC=CC2=C1C=CC=C2)C3=CN(CCCCCCC)C(C4=CC=CC=C4)=C3
- InChI: InChI=1S/C28H29NO/c1-2-3-4-5-11-19-29-21-24(20-27(29)23-14-7-6-8-15-23)28(30)26-18-12-16-22-13-9-10-17-25(22)26/h6-10,12-18,20-21H,2-5,11,19H2,1H3; Key:JDBFNFBWXVCTSA-UHFFFAOYSA-N

JWH-146 (1-heptyl-5-phenyl-1H-pyrrol-3-yl)-1-naphthalenyl-methanone) is a synthetic cannabinoid from the naphthoylpyrrole family which acts as an agonist of the CB_{1} (K_{i} = 21 ± 2nM) and CB_{2} (K_{i} = 62 ± 5nM) receptors, with a moderate (~2.9x) selectivity for the CB_{1} receptor over the CB_{2} receptor. JWH-146 was first synthesized in 2006 by John W. Huffman and colleagues to examine the nature of ligand binding to the CB_{1} receptor.

== Legality ==
In the United States JWH-146 is not federally scheduled, although some states have passed legislation banning the sale, possession, and manufacture of JWH-146.

In Canada, JWH-146 and other naphthoylpyrrole-based cannabinoids are Schedule II controlled substances under the Controlled Drugs and Substances Act.

In the United Kingdom, JWH-146 and other naphthoylpyrrole-based cannabinoids are considered Class B drugs under the Misuse of Drugs Act 1971.

== See also ==
- List of JWH cannabinoids
- Synthetic cannabinoid
