= JWH-051 =

Chemical compound

Legal status
- Legal status: DE: unscheduled

Identifiers
- IUPAC name: ((6aR,10aR)-6,6-Dimethyl-3-(2-methyloctan-2-yl)-6a,7,10,10a-tetrahydrobenzo[c]chromen-9-yl)methanol
- CAS Number: 81764-31-8
- PubChem CID: 9799540
- ChemSpider: 7975305
- CompTox Dashboard (EPA): DTXSID001027455

Chemical and physical data
- Formula: C_{25}H_{38}O_{2}
- Molar mass: 370.577 g·mol^{−1}
- 3D model (JSmol): Interactive image
- SMILES: CCCCCCC(C)(C)C1=CC2=C(C=C1)[C@@H]3CC(=CC[C@H]3C(O2)(C)C)CO
- InChI: InChI=1S/C25H38O2/c1-6-7-8-9-14-24(2,3)19-11-12-20-21-15-18(17-26)10-13-22(21)25(4,5)27-23(20)16-19/h10-12,16,21-22,26H,6-9,13-15,17H2,1-5H3/t21-,22+/m0/s1; Key:ORTVDISIJXKUAV-FCHUYYIVSA-N

JWH-051 is an analgesic drug which is a cannabinoid agonist. Its chemical structure is closely related to that of the potent cannabinoid agonist HU-210, with the only difference being the removal of the hydroxyl group at position 1 of the aromatic ring. It was discovered and named after John W. Huffman.

JWH-051 retains high affinity for the CB_{1} receptor, but is a much stronger agonist for CB_{2}, with a Ki value of 14nM at CB_{2} vs 19nM at CB_{1}. It was one of the first CB_{2}-selective ligands developed, although its selectivity for CB_{2} is modest compared to newer compounds such as HU-308.

It has similar effects to other cannabinoid agonists such as sedation and analgesia, but with a relatively strong antiinflammatory effect due to its strong activity at CB_{2}.
