= JWH-363 =

Chemical compound

Legal status
- Legal status: CA: Schedule II; UK: Class B

Identifiers
- IUPAC name: 1-Naphthyl{1-pentyl-5-[3-(trifluoromethyl)phenyl]-1H-pyrrol-3-yl}methanone
- CAS Number: 914458-33-6
- PubChem CID: 44418338
- ChemSpider: 23277916
- CompTox Dashboard (EPA): DTXSID701337009

Chemical and physical data
- Formula: C_{27}H_{24}F_{3}NO
- Molar mass: 435.490 g·mol^{−1}
- 3D model (JSmol): Interactive image
- SMILES: CCCCCN1C=C(C=C1C2=CC(=CC=C2)C(F)(F)F)C(=O)C3=CC=CC4=CC=CC=C43
- InChI: InChI=1S/C27H24F3NO/c1-2-3-6-15-31-18-21(17-25(31)20-11-7-12-22(16-20)27(28,29)30)26(32)24-14-8-10-19-9-4-5-13-23(19)24/h4-5,7-14,16-18H,2-3,6,15H2,1H3; Key:GETLFVZYXNFVJS-UHFFFAOYSA-N

JWH-363 (1-Naphthyl{1-pentyl-5-[3-(trifluoromethyl)phenyl]-1H-pyrrol-3-yl}methanone) is a synthetic cannabinoid from the naphthoylpyrrole family which acts as an agonist of the CB_{1} (K_{i} = 245 ± 5nM) and CB_{2} (K_{i} = 71 ± 1nM) receptors, with a moderate (~3.45x) selectivity for the latter. JWH-363 was first synthesized in 2006 by John W. Huffman and colleagues to examine the nature of ligand binding to the CB_{1} receptor.

== Legality ==
In the United States JWH-363 is not federally scheduled, although some states have passed legislation banning the sale, possession, and manufacture of JWH-363.

In Canada, JWH-363 and other naphthoylpyrrole-based cannabinoids are Schedule II controlled substances under the Controlled Drugs and Substances Act.

In the United Kingdom, JWH-363 and other naphthoylpyrrole-based cannabinoids are considered Class B drugs under the Misuse of Drugs Act 1971.

== See also ==
- List of JWH cannabinoids
- Synthetic cannabinoid
