= JWH-370 =

Chemical compound

Legal status
- Legal status: CA: Schedule II; UK: Class B

Identifiers
- IUPAC name: [5-(2-methylphenyl)-1-pentylpyrrol-3-yl]-naphthalen-1-ylmethanone
- CAS Number: 914458-22-3
- PubChem CID: 44418312
- ChemSpider: 23277889
- UNII: HJZ9JN4HNM
- CompTox Dashboard (EPA): DTXSID701016340

Chemical and physical data
- Formula: C_{27}H_{27}NO
- Molar mass: 381.519 g·mol^{−1}
- 3D model (JSmol): Interactive image
- SMILES: CCCCCN1C=C(C=C1C2=CC=CC=C2C)C(=O)C3=CC=CC4=CC=CC=C43
- InChI: InChI=1S/C27H27NO/c1-3-4-9-17-28-19-22(18-26(28)23-14-7-5-11-20(23)2)27(29)25-16-10-13-21-12-6-8-15-24(21)25/h5-8,10-16,18-19H,3-4,9,17H2,1-2H3; Key:HZMLAMXVETUEJZ-UHFFFAOYSA-N

JWH-370 ([5-(2-methylphenyl)-1-pentylpyrrol-3-yl]-naphthalen-1-ylmethanone) is a synthetic cannabinoid from the naphthoylpyrrole family which acts as an agonist of the CB_{1} (K_{i} = 5.6 ± 0.4nM) and CB_{2} (K_{i} = 4.0 ± 0.5nM) receptors, with a slight selectivity for the CB_{2} receptor. JWH-370 was first synthesized in 2006 by John W. Huffman and colleagues to examine the nature of ligand binding to the CB_{1} receptor.

== Legality ==
In the United States JWH-370 is not federally scheduled, although some states have passed legislation banning the sale, possession, and manufacture of JWH-370.

In Canada, JWH-370 and other naphthoylpyrrole-based cannabinoids are Schedule II controlled substances under the Controlled Drugs and Substances Act.

In the United Kingdom, JWH-370 and other naphthoylpyrrole-based cannabinoids are considered Class B drugs under the Misuse of Drugs Act 1971.

== See also ==
- List of JWH cannabinoids
- Synthetic cannabinoid
