= JWH-116 =

Chemical compound

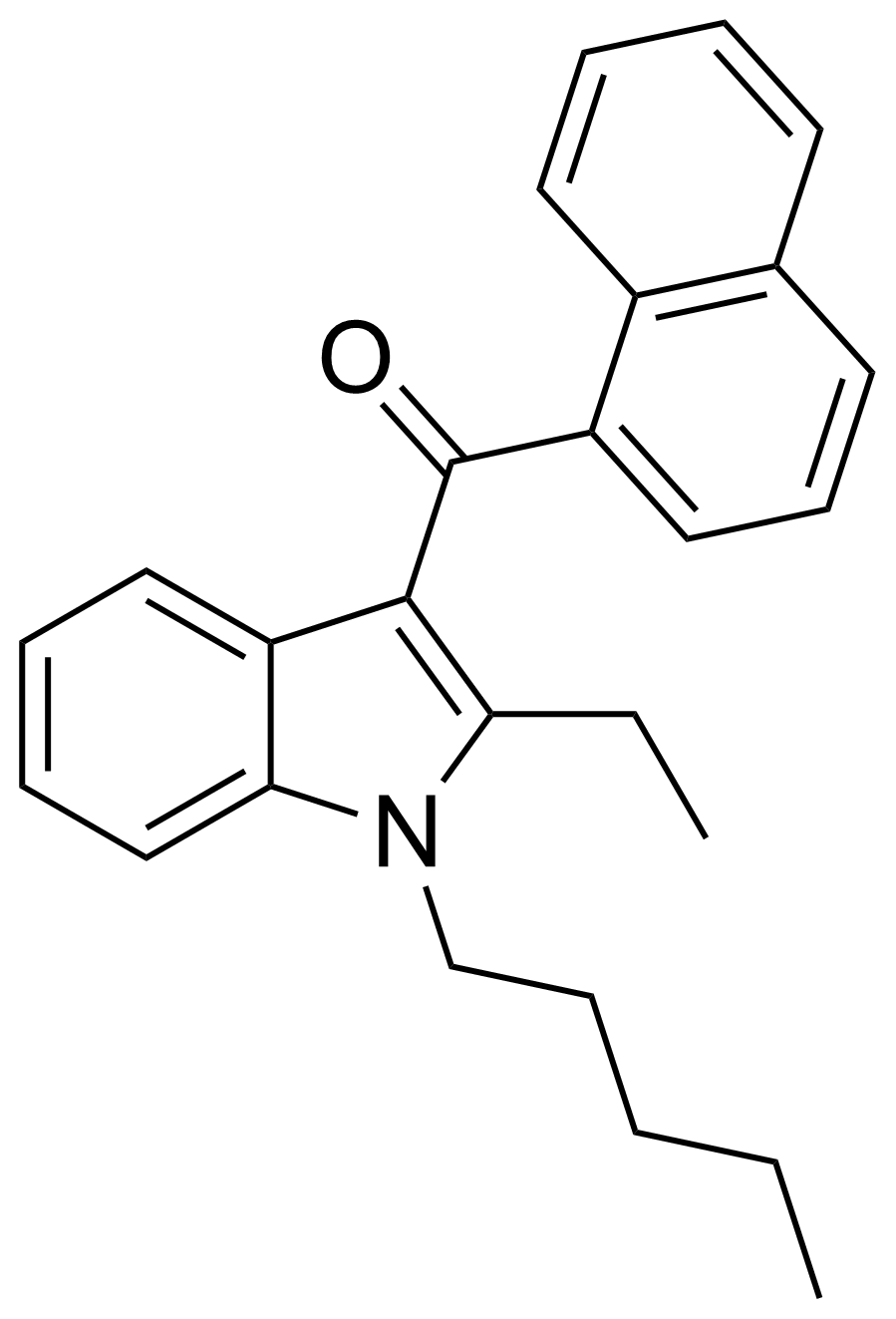

Legal status
- Legal status: CA: Schedule II; DE: NpSG (Industrial and scientific use only); UK: Class B; US: Schedule I

Identifiers
- IUPAC name: (2-Ethyl-1-pentyl-1H-indol-3-yl)-1-naphthalenylmethanone
- CAS Number: 619294-64-3
- ChemSpider: 29341485
- UNII: RKP962UAI3
- CompTox Dashboard (EPA): DTXSID60210966

Chemical and physical data
- Formula: C_{26}H_{27}NO
- Molar mass: 369.508 g·mol^{−1}
- 3D model (JSmol): Interactive image
- SMILES: CCCCCN1C2=CC=CC=C2C(=C1CC)C(=O)C3=CC=CC4=CC=CC=C43
- InChI: InChI=1S/C26H27NO/c1-3-5-10-18-27-23(4-2)25(22-15-8-9-17-24(22)27)26(28)21-16-11-13-19-12-6-7-14-20(19)21/h6-9,11-17H,3-5,10,18H2,1-2H3; Key:AQHPTHKEKSWGPO-UHFFFAOYSA-N

JWH-116 is a synthetic cannabinoid receptor ligand from the naphthoylindole family. It is the indole 2-ethyl derivative of related compound JWH-018. The binding affinity of JWH-116 for the CB_{1} receptor is reported as K_{i} = 52 ± 5 nM.

In the United States, all CB_{1} receptor agonists of the 3-(1-naphthoyl)indole class such as JWH-116 are Schedule I Controlled Substances.

== See also ==
- JWH-018
- JWH-081
