= JWH-200 =

Chemical compound

Clinical data
- Other names: WIN 55,225

Legal status
- Legal status: AU: S9 (Prohibited substance); CA: Schedule II; DE: Anlage II (Authorized trade only, not prescriptible); UK: Class B; US: Schedule I

Identifiers
- IUPAC name: (1-(2-Morpholin-4-ylethyl)indol-3-yl)-naphthalen-1-ylmethanone
- CAS Number: 103610-04-4
- PubChem CID: 10045570
- ChemSpider: 8221134
- UNII: 9HN5J913P3
- CompTox Dashboard (EPA): DTXSID60145946

Chemical and physical data
- Formula: C_{25}H_{24}N_{2}O_{2}
- Molar mass: 384.479 g·mol^{−1}
- 3D model (JSmol): Interactive image
- SMILES: O=C(C1=CC=CC2=C1C=CC=C2)C3=CN(C4=C3C=CC=C4)CCN5CCOCC5
- InChI: InChI=1S/C25H24N2O2/c28-25(22-10-5-7-19-6-1-2-8-20(19)22)23-18-27(24-11-4-3-9-21(23)24)13-12-26-14-16-29-17-15-26/h1-11,18H,12-17H2; Key:SZWYXJHTNGJPKU-UHFFFAOYSA-N

JWH-200 (WIN 55,225) is an analgesic chemical from the aminoalkylindole family that acts as a cannabinoid receptor agonist. Its binding affinity, K_{i} at the CB_{1} receptor is 42 nM, around the same as that of THC, but its analgesic potency in vivo was higher than that of other analogues with stronger CB_{1} binding affinity in vitro, around 3 times that of THC but with less sedative effect, most likely reflecting favourable pharmacokinetic characteristics. It was discovered in 1991 by Sterling Drug as a potential analgesic following the earlier identification of related compounds such as pravadoline and WIN 55,212-2.

== Legal status ==
=== Australia ===
JWH-200 is considered a Schedule 9 prohibited substance in Australia under the Poisons Standard (October 2015). A Schedule 9 substance is a substance which may be abused or misused, the manufacture, possession, sale or use of which should be prohibited by law except when required for medical or scientific research, or for analytical, teaching or training purposes with approval of Commonwealth and/or State or Territory Health Authorities.

=== Canada ===
In July 2015, JWH-200 became a controlled substance in Canada.

=== United States ===
The US DEA temporarily declared JWH-200 a schedule I controlled substance on 1 March 2011 through 76 FR 11075, and permanently instated the same schedule on 9 July 2012 in the Section 1152 of the Food and Drug Administration Safety and Innovation Act.

=== Germany ===
JWH-200 has been classified under the BtMG as Anlage II.

== See also ==
- A-796,260
- BMS-F
- JWH-018
- JWH-073
- CP-47,497
- HU-210
- MEPIRAPIM
