= JWH-019 =

Chemical compound

Legal status
- Legal status: CA: Schedule II; DE: Anlage II (Authorized trade only, not prescriptible); UK: Class B; US: Schedule I; Illegal in Sweden, I-N (Poland)

Identifiers
- IUPAC name: 1-Hexyl-3-(naphthalen-1-oyl)indole
- CAS Number: 209414-08-4
- ChemSpider: 24598813
- UNII: 0Z73828O4J
- CompTox Dashboard (EPA): DTXSID70175118

Chemical and physical data
- Formula: C_{25}H_{25}NO
- Molar mass: 355.481 g·mol^{−1}
- 3D model (JSmol): Interactive image
- SMILES: c3cccc2c3cccc2C(=O)c1cn(CCCCCC)c4c1cccc4
- InChI: InChI=1S/C25H25NO/c1-2-3-4-9-17-26-18-23(21-14-7-8-16-24(21)26)25(27)22-15-10-12-19-11-5-6-13-20(19)22/h5-8,10-16,18H,2-4,9,17H2,1H3; Key:PALJPGHWDUHUPO-UHFFFAOYSA-N

JWH-019 is an analgesic chemical from the naphthoylindole family that acts as a cannabinoid agonist at both the CB_{1} and CB_{2} receptors. It is the N-hexyl homolog of the more common synthetic cannabinoid compound JWH-018. Unlike the butyl homolog JWH-073, which is several times weaker than JWH-018, the hexyl homolog is only slightly less potent, although extending the chain one carbon longer to the heptyl homolog JWH-020 results in dramatic loss of activity. These results show that the optimum side chain length for CB_{1} binding in the naphthoylindole series is the five-carbon pentyl chain, shorter than in the classical cannabinoids where a seven-carbon heptyl chain produces the most potent compounds. This difference is thought to reflect a slightly different binding conformation adopted by the naphthoylindole compounds as compared to the classical cannabinoids, and may be useful in characterizing the active site of the CB_{1} and CB_{2} receptors.

== Legal status ==
=== China ===
As of October 2015 JWH-019 is a controlled substance in China.

=== Poland ===
In Poland, JWH-019 is I-N (Poland).

=== Sweden ===
JWH-019 is illegal in Sweden.

=== United Kingdom ===
JWH-019 is Class B in the United Kingdom.

=== United States ===
JWH-019 is a Schedule I controlled substance, controlled federally in the United States.

=== Germany ===
JWH-019 has been classified under the BtMG as Anlage II.

== See also ==
- JWH-007
- JWH-018
- JWH-073
- JWH-200
- List of JWH cannabinoids
