= JWH-164 =

Chemical compound

Legal status
- Legal status: US: Schedule I

Identifiers
- IUPAC name: 7-Methoxynaphthalen-1-yl-(1-pentylindol-3-yl)methanone
- CAS Number: 824961-61-7
- PubChem CID: 45271217
- ChemSpider: 24618407
- UNII: L3432L6CJJ
- CompTox Dashboard (EPA): DTXSID70669880

Chemical and physical data
- Formula: C_{25}H_{25}NO_{2}
- Molar mass: 371.480 g·mol^{−1}
- 3D model (JSmol): Interactive image
- SMILES: CCCCCn(c4)c1ccccc1c4C(=O)c2cccc(cc3)c2cc3OC
- InChI: InChI=1S/C25H25NO2/c1-3-4-7-15-26-17-23(20-10-5-6-12-24(20)26)25(27)21-11-8-9-18-13-14-19(28-2)16-22(18)21/h5-6,8-14,16-17H,3-4,7,15H2,1-2H3; Key:IJNSZBAEVYRFCH-UHFFFAOYSA-N

JWH-164 is a synthetic cannabinoid receptor agonist from the naphthoylindole family. It has approximately equal affinity for the CB_{1} and CB_{2} receptors, with a K_{i} of 6.6 nM at CB_{1} and 6.9 nM at CB_{2}. JWH-164 is a positional isomer of the related compound JWH-081, but with a methoxy group at the 7-position of the naphthyl ring, rather than the 4-position as in JWH-081. Its potency is intermediate between that of JWH-081 and its ring unsubstituted derivative JWH-018, demonstrating that substitution of the naphthyl 7-position can also result in increased cannabinoid receptor binding affinity.

In the United States, all CB_{1} all receptor agonists of the 3-(1-naphthoyl)indole class, including JWH-164, are Schedule I Controlled Substances.
