= JWH-133 =

Chemical compound

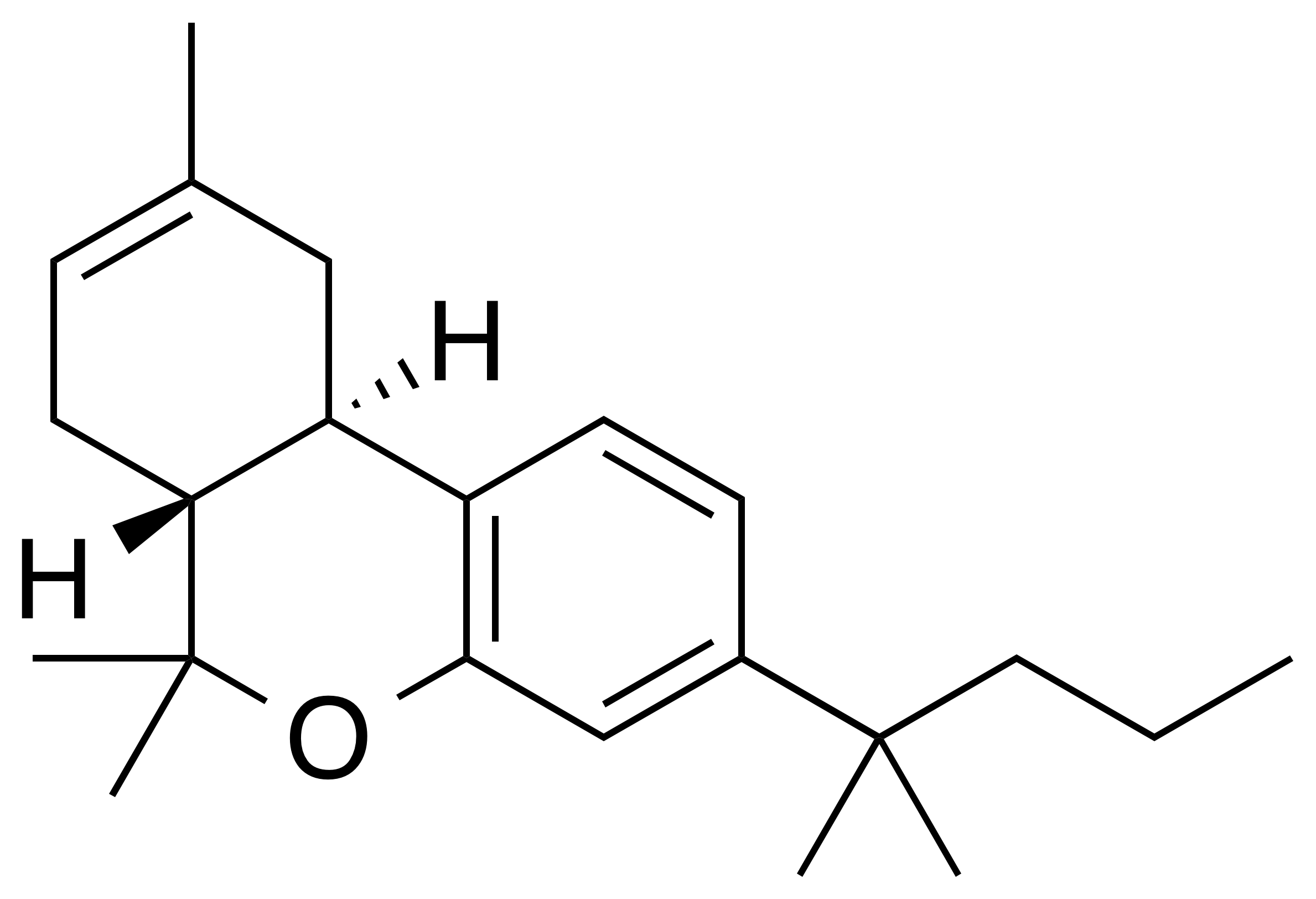

Identifiers
- IUPAC name: (6aR,10aR)-3-(1,1-Dimethylbutyl)-6a,7,10,10a-tetrahydro -6,6,9-trimethyl-6H-dibenzo[b,d]pyran
- CAS Number: 259869-55-1
- PubChem CID: 6918505
- IUPHAR/BPS: 747
- ChemSpider: 5293702
- UNII: TDG8048RDA
- ChEBI: CHEBI:146243
- ChEMBL: ChEMBL371214
- CompTox Dashboard (EPA): DTXSID30426077

Chemical and physical data
- Formula: C_{22}H_{32}O
- Molar mass: 312.497 g·mol^{−1}
- 3D model (JSmol): Interactive image
- SMILES: O3c1cc(ccc1[C@@H]2C\C(=C/C[C@H]2C3(C)C)C)C(C)(C)CCC
- InChI: InChI=1S/C22H32O/c1-7-12-21(3,4)16-9-10-17-18-13-15(2)8-11-19(18)22(5,6)23-20(17)14-16/h8-10,14,18-19H,7,11-13H2,1-6H3/t18-,19+/m0/s1; Key:YSBFLLZNALVODA-RBUKOAKNSA-N

JWH-133 (Dimethylbutyl-deoxy-Delta-8-THC) is a potent selective CB_{2} receptor agonist with a Ki of 3.4nM and selectivity of around 200x for CB_{2} over CB_{1} receptors. It was discovered by and named after John W. Huffman.

JWH-133 has been confused with other analogs of Delta-8-THC in peer-reviewed literature. It has been confused with Dimethylpentyl-Delta-8-THC as well as Dimethylbutyl-Delta-8-THC, including confusing the chemical name with Dimethylbutyl-Delta-8-THC itself. It has been confused with the Delta-9 isomer

The 3-(1',1'-Dimethylbutyl)-1-deoxy-delta-8-THC is a selective CB2 agonist, binding 677nM at Cb1 and 3.4nM at CB2 while 3-(1',1'-Dimethylbutyl)-delta-8-THC itself binds 65nM at CB1. Structurally the only difference between JWH-133 and dimethylbutyl-D8-THC is that JWH-133 lacks the hydroxy group seen on dimethylbutyl-D8-THCs phenol structure (the C1 position of the A ring), turning this group into a phenyl (JWH-133) instead of phenol. It is generally accepted that removing the hydroxy group from the phenol structure of any classical cannabinoid benzopyran (such as THC) results in dramatically less CB1 activity and heightened CB2 activity.

JWH-133, alongside WIN 55,212-2 and HU-210, is responsible for preventing the inflammation caused by Amyloid beta proteins involved in Alzheimer's disease, in addition to preventing cognitive impairment and loss of neuronal markers. This anti-inflammatory action is induced through agonist action at the CB_{2} receptor, which prevents microglial activation that elicits the inflammation. Additionally, cannabinoids at this receptor completely abolish neurotoxicity related to microglia activation in rat models.

It may be linked with anti-cancer properties, according to pre-trial data from a 2010 study in Madrid.

== Legal Status ==
JWH-133 is not specifically listed in the United States controlled substance act but may be considered an analog of THC (under the Federal Analogue Act) if sold for human consumption.

It is also not specifically listed in the German BtMG.

== See also ==
- 1'-Dimethyl-Δ9-THCH
