= JWH-073 =

Chemical compound

Legal status
- Legal status: BR: Class F2 (Prohibited psychotropics); CA: Schedule II; DE: Anlage II (Authorized trade only, not prescriptible); UK: Class B; US: Schedule I; Illegal in Latvia & Poland

Identifiers
- IUPAC name: Naphthalen-1-yl-(1-butylindol-3-yl)methanone
- CAS Number: 208987-48-8
- PubChem CID: 10471670
- ChemSpider: 8647081
- UNII: BBX3BP2772
- KEGG: C22764
- CompTox Dashboard (EPA): DTXSID20175042
- ECHA InfoCard: 100.230.192

Chemical and physical data
- Formula: C_{23}H_{21}NO
- Molar mass: 327.427 g·mol^{−1}
- 3D model (JSmol): Interactive image
- SMILES: CCCCN1C=C(C2=CC=CC=C21)C(=O)C3=CC=CC4=CC=CC=C43
- InChI: InChI=1S/C23H21NO/c1-2-3-15-24-16-21(19-12-6-7-14-22(19)24)23(25)20-13-8-10-17-9-4-5-11-18(17)20/h4-14,16H,2-3,15H2,1H3; Key:VCHHHSMPMLNVGS-UHFFFAOYSA-N

JWH-073, a synthetic cannabinoid, is an analgesic chemical from the naphthoylindole family that acts as a full agonist at both the CB_{1} and CB_{2} cannabinoid receptors. It is somewhat selective for the CB_{1} subtype, with affinity at this subtype approximately 5× the affinity at CB_{2}. The abbreviation JWH stands for John W. Huffman, one of the inventors of the compound.

On 20 April 2009, JWH-073 was claimed by researchers at the University of Freiburg to have been found in a "fertiliser" product called "Forest Humus", along with another synthetic cannabinoid (C8)-CP 47,497. These claims were confirmed in July 2009 when tests of Spice product, seized after the legal ban on JWH-018 had gone into effect in Germany, were shown to contain the unregulated compound JWH-073 instead.

Analgesic effects of cannabinoid ligands have been demonstrated in multiple animal pain models (neuropathic, nociceptive).

These compounds work by mimicking the body's naturally-produced endocannabinoid hormones such as 2-arachidonoylglycerol and anandamide, which are biologically active and can exacerbate or inhibit nerve signaling.

== Pharmacology ==
JWH-073 has been shown to produce behavioral effects very similar to THC in animals.

Its effects are produced by binding and acting as an agonist to the CB_{1} and CB_{2} cannabinoid receptors. The CB_{1} receptor is found in the brain. JWH-073 binds to CB_{1} with a higher affinity than THC. CB_{2} is found outside the brain, mostly in the immune system. The binding with CB_{2} receptors has been shown to be similar between JWH-073 and THC.

A search in the literature yielded no published studies of the effects of JWH-073 in humans, but these studies in animals suggest with high probability that JWH-073 produces effects very similar to those of THC in humans.

== Derivatives ==
The 4'-methyl derivative of JWH-073 has been encountered as an ingredient of synthetic cannabis blends in Germany and several other European countries since 2010. The 4'-methoxy derivative JWH-080 is also known to be a potent cannabinoid agonist and has been banned in some countries, though it is unclear if it has also been used in synthetic cannabis smoking blends.

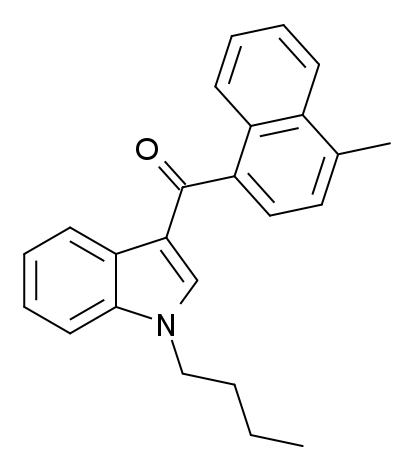
4'-Methyl-JWH-073

== Legal status ==
=== United States ===
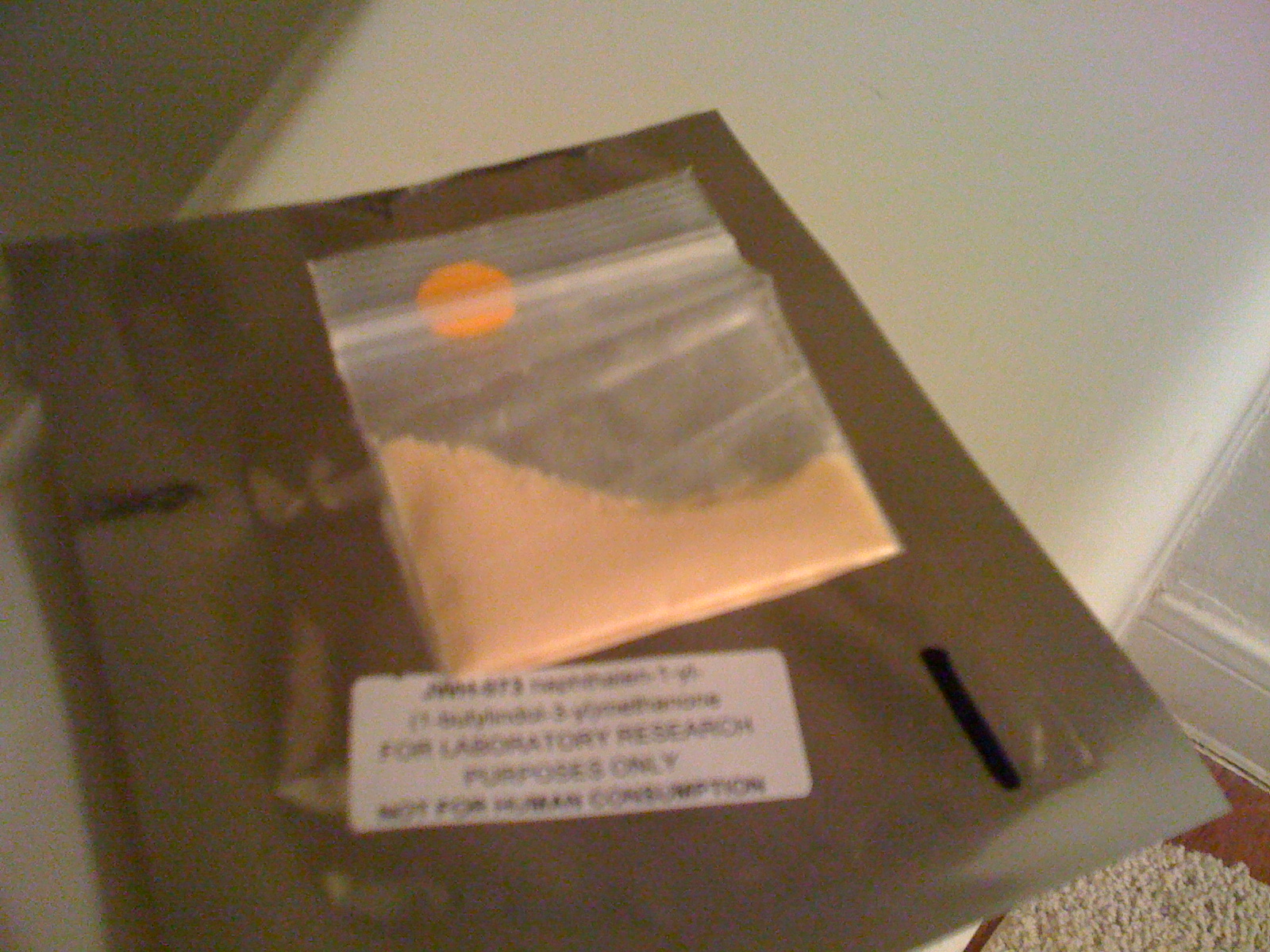
1 g of JWH-073

The US DEA temporarily declared JWH-073 a schedule I controlled substance on 1 March 2011 through 76 FR 11075, and permanently instated the same schedule on 9 July 2012 in the Section 1152 of the Food and Drug Administration Safety and Innovation Act.

=== Australia ===
On 8 July 2011 the AUS government banned the sale of JWH-073. JWH-073 is considered a Schedule 9 prohibited substance in Australia under the Poisons Standard (October 2015). A Schedule 9 substance is a substance which may be abused or misused, the manufacture, possession, sale or use of which should be prohibited by law except when required for medical or scientific research, or for analytical, teaching or training purposes with approval of Commonwealth and/or State or Territory Health Authorities.

=== New Zealand ===
On 8 May 2014 the New Zealand government banned the sale of JWH-073.

=== Turkey ===
On 7 January 2011 the Turkey government banned the sale of JWH-073.

=== Germany ===
JWH-073 has been classified under the BtMG as Anlage II.

== See also ==
- HU-210
- JWH-019
- JWH-081
- MEPIRAPIM
