= JWH-184 =

Chemical compound

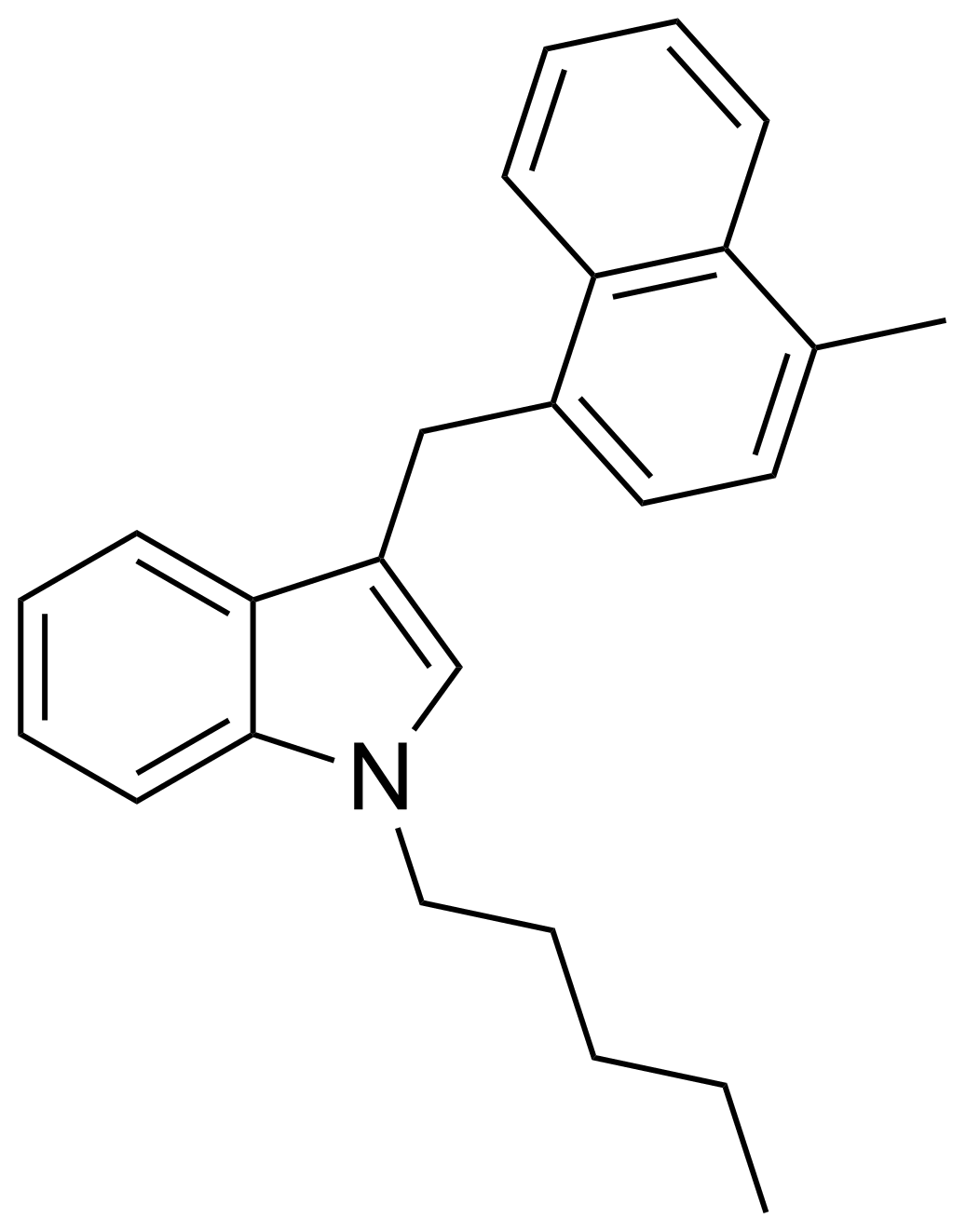

Legal status
- Legal status: UK: Class B; US: Schedule I

Identifiers
- IUPAC name: 3-[(4-Methyl-1-naphthalenyl)methyl]-1-pentyl-1H-indole
- CAS Number: 619294-37-0
- ChemSpider: 35303439
- UNII: QKU9P2ZGM5

Chemical and physical data
- Formula: C_{25}H_{27}N
- Molar mass: 341.498 g·mol^{−1}
- 3D model (JSmol): Interactive image
- SMILES: CCCCCn1cc(c2c1cccc2)Cc3ccc(c4c3cccc4)C
- InChI: InChI=1S/C25H27N/c1-3-4-9-16-26-18-21(24-12-7-8-13-25(24)26)17-20-15-14-19(2)22-10-5-6-11-23(20)22/h5-8,10-15,18H,3-4,9,16-17H2,1-2H3; Key:FSOLXFPDIJJWBM-UHFFFAOYSA-N

JWH-184 is a synthetic cannabinoid receptor ligand from the naphthylmethylindole family. It is the carbonyl-reduced derivative of related compound JWH-122. The binding affinity of JWH-184 for the CB_{1} receptor is reported as K_{i} = 23 ± 6 nM.

In the United States, all CB_{1} receptor agonists of the 3-(1-naphthylmethane)indole class such as JWH-184 are Schedule I Controlled Substances.

== See also ==
- JWH-018
- JWH-122
- JWH-185
