= JWH-015 =

Chemical compound

Legal status
- Legal status: CA: Schedule II; DE: Anlage II (Authorized trade only, not prescriptible); UK: Class B; US: Schedule I

Identifiers
- IUPAC name: (2-Methyl-1-propyl-1H-indol-3-yl)-1-naphthalenylmethanone
- CAS Number: 155471-08-2
- PubChem CID: 4273754
- IUPHAR/BPS: 5558
- ChemSpider: 3480676
- UNII: W4FL204T10
- CompTox Dashboard (EPA): DTXSID60165902
- ECHA InfoCard: 100.161.912

Chemical and physical data
- Formula: C_{23}H_{21}NO
- Molar mass: 327.427 g·mol^{−1}
- 3D model (JSmol): Interactive image
- SMILES: CCCN1C(=C(C2=CC=CC=C21)C(=O)C3=CC=CC4=CC=CC=C43)C
- InChI: InChI=1S/C23H21NO/c1-3-15-24-16(2)22(20-12-6-7-14-21(20)24)23(25)19-13-8-10-17-9-4-5-11-18(17)19/h4-14H,3,15H2,1-2H3; Key:LJSBBBWQTLXQEN-UHFFFAOYSA-N

JWH-015 is a chemical from the naphthoylindole family that acts as a subtype-selective cannabinoid agonist. Its affinity for CB_{2} receptors is 13.8 nM, while its affinity for CB_{1} is 383 nM, meaning that it binds almost 28 times more strongly to CB_{2} than to CB_{1}. However, it still displays some CB_{1} activity, and in some model systems can be very potent and efficacious at activating CB_{1} receptors, and therefore it is not as selective as newer drugs such as JWH-133. It has been shown to possess immunomodulatory effects, and CB_{2} agonists may be useful in the treatment of pain and inflammation. It was discovered and named after John W. Huffman.

== Metabolism ==
JWH-015 has been shown in vitro to be metabolized primarily by hydroxylation and N-dealkylation, and also by epoxidation of the naphthalene ring, similar to the metabolic pathways seen for other aminoalkylindole cannabinoids such as WIN 55,212-2. Epoxidation of polycyclic aromatic hydrocarbons (see for example benzo(a)pyrene toxicity) can produce carcinogenic metabolites, although there is no evidence to show that JWH-015 or other aminoalkylindole cannabinoids are actually carcinogenic in vivo. JWH-015 may signal certain cancers to shrink through a process called apoptosis.

== Legal status ==
In the United States, all CB_{1} receptor agonists of the 3-(1-naphthoyl)indole class such as JWH-015 are Schedule I Controlled Substances.

As of October 2015 JWH-015 is a controlled substance in China.

JWH-015 has been classified under the German BtMG as Anlage II.
