= HU-210 =

Synthetic cannabinoid

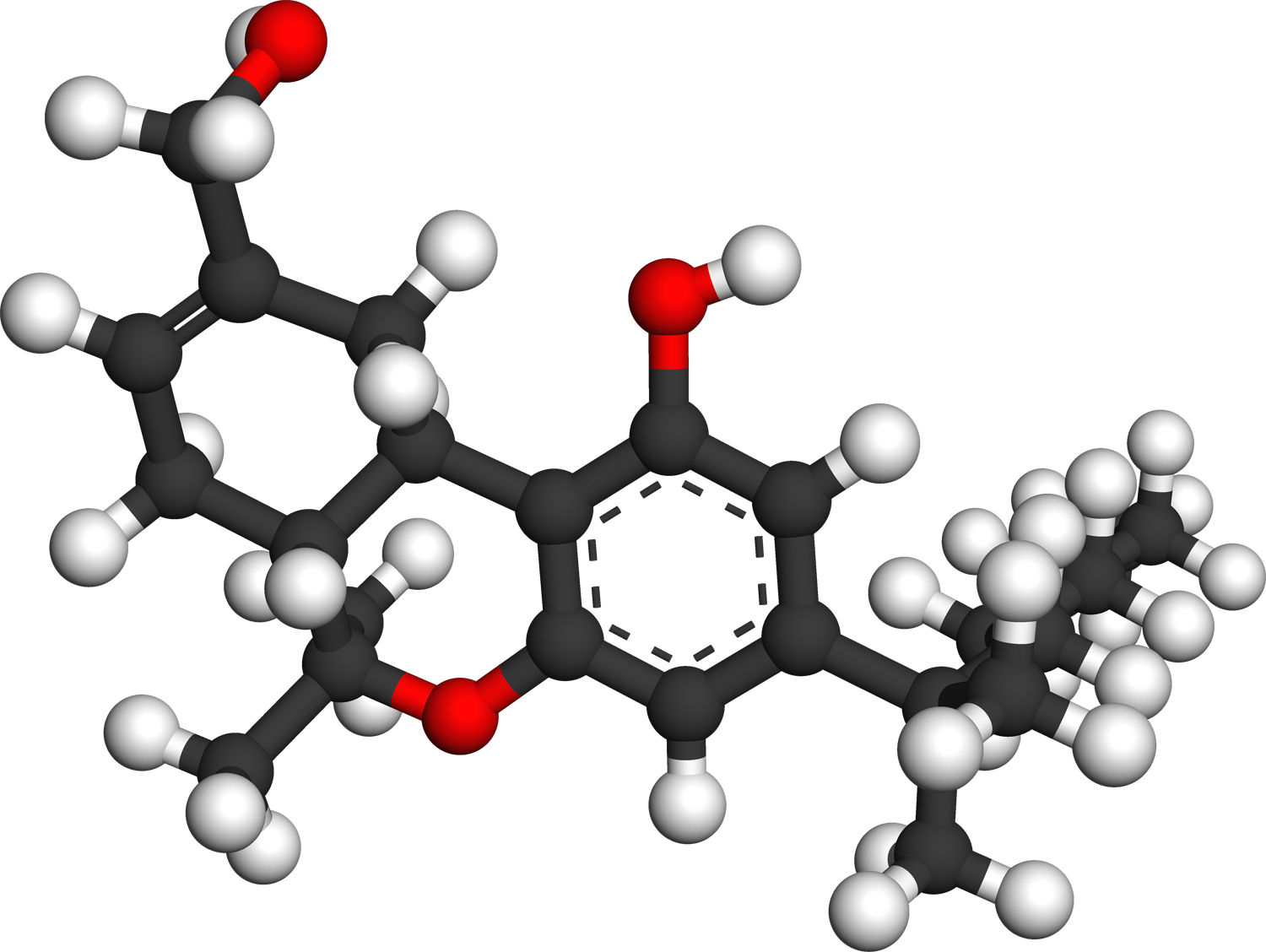

Clinical data
- Other names: 1,1-Dimethylheptyl-11-hydroxy-Δ8-tetrahydrocannabinol

Legal status
- Legal status: CA: Schedule II; UK: Class B; US: Schedule I

Identifiers
- IUPAC name: (6aR,10aR)-9-(hydroxymethyl)-6,6-dimethyl-3-(2-methyloctan-2-yl)-6H,6aH,7H,10H,10aH-benzo[c]isochromen-1-ol
- CAS Number: 112830-95-2
- PubChem CID: 9821569
- IUPHAR/BPS: 731
- ChemSpider: 7997318
- UNII: 191042422P
- ChEMBL: ChEMBL307696
- PDB ligand: A1H66 (PDBe, RCSB PDB)
- CompTox Dashboard (EPA): DTXSID30150188

Chemical and physical data
- Formula: C_{25}H_{38}O_{3}
- Molar mass: 386.576 g·mol^{−1}
- 3D model (JSmol): Interactive image
- SMILES: CCCCCCC(C)(C)C1=CC2=C([C@@H]3CC(=CC[C@H]3C(O2)(C)C)CO)C(=C1)O
- InChI: InChI=1S/C25H38O3/c1-6-7-8-9-12-24(2,3)18-14-21(27)23-19-13-17(16-26)10-11-20(19)25(4,5)28-22(23)15-18/h10,14-15,19-20,26-27H,6-9,11-13,16H2,1-5H3/t19-,20-/m1/s1; Key:SSQJFGMEZBFMNV-WOJBJXKFSA-N

HU-210 (11-hydroxy-Δ^{8}-THC-1',1'-DMH) is a synthetic cannabinoid that was first synthesized in 1988 from (1R,5S)-myrtenol by a group led by Raphael Mechoulam at the Hebrew University. HU-210 is 100 to 800 times more potent than natural THC from cannabis and has an extended duration of action. HU-210 has a binding affinity of 0.061 nM at CB_{1} receptors compared to 40.7 nM for Δ^{9}-THC. The binding pose of HU-210 to the CB_{1} receptor is similar to other synthetic cannabinoids.

== Effects and research ==
HU-210, the (–) enantiomer, is an ultrapotent cannabinoid, while its (+) enantiomer HU-211 is not a cannabinoid, but an NMDA antagonist with neuroprotective effects.

HU-210 has a TDLO of 25 μg/kg in rats.

== Chemistry ==
HU-210 is the enantiomer of HU-211 (dexanabinol). The original synthesis of HU-210 is based on an acid-catalyzed condensation of (–)-Myrtenol and 1,1-Dimethylheptylresorcinol (3,5-Dihydroxy-1-(1,1-dimethylheptyl)benzol).

HU-210 synthesis

== Legal status ==
HU-210 is not listed in the schedules set out by the United Nations' Single Convention on Narcotic Drugs from 1961 nor their Convention on Psychotropic Substances from 1971, so the signatory countries to these international drug control treaties are not required by said treaties to control HU-210.

=== New Zealand ===
HU-210 is banned in New Zealand as of 8 May 2014.

=== United States ===
HU-210 is not explicitly listed in the list of scheduled controlled substances in the USA. A brief profile of HU-210 written and published by the Drug Enforcement Administration (DEA) in 2009, but removed in later years, stated that HU-210 is a Schedule I controlled substance under the Controlled Substances Act due to being similar to THC. A version of the document (updated in 2013), now in PDF form, exists on the DEA Office of Diversion Control's website. In that PDF, the DEA reasserts that HU-210 is a Schedule I substance. The DEA currently considers HU-210 a Schedule I controlled substance under the umbrella of 'tetrahydrocannabinols' under CSCN 7370.

==== Alabama ====
HU-210 is a Schedule I controlled substance in Alabama.

(4)a. A synthetic controlled substance that is any material, mixture, or preparation that contains any quantity of the following chemical compounds, their salts, isomers and salts of isomers, unless specifically excepted, whenever the existence of these salts, isomers and salts of isomers is possible within the specific chemical designation or compound:

...

9. (6aR, 10aR)-9-(hydroxymethyl)-6,6-dimethyl-3-(2-methyloctan-2-yl)-6a,7,10,10a-tetrahydrobenzo[c]chromen-1-ol, some trade or other names: HU-210.

==== Florida ====
HU-210 is a Schedule I controlled substance, categorized as a hallucinogen, making it illegal to buy, sell, or possess in the state of Florida without a license.

(c) Unless specifically excepted or unless listed in another schedule, any material, compound, mixture, or preparation that contains any quantity of the following hallucinogenic substances or that contains any of their salts, isomers, including optical, positional, or geometric isomers, homologues, nitrogen-heterocyclic analogs, esters, ethers, and salts of isomers, homologues, nitrogen-heterocyclic analogs, esters, or ethers, if the existence of such salts, isomers, and salts of isomers is possible within the specific chemical designation or class description: ... 47. HU-210 [(6aR,10aR)-9-(Hydroxymethyl)-6,6-dimethyl-3-(2-methyloctan-2-yl)-6a,7,10,10a-tetrahydrobenzo[c]chromen-1-ol].

==== Vermont ====
Effective January 1, 2016, HU-210 is a regulated drug in Vermont designated as a "Hallucinogenic Drug."

== See also ==
- 11-Hydroxy-Delta-8-THC
- Nabilone
- CP 47,497
