= JWH-081 =

Chemical compound

Legal status
- Legal status: BR: Class F2 (Prohibited psychotropics); CA: Schedule II; DE: Anlage II (Authorized trade only, not prescriptible); UK: Class B; US: Schedule I; I-N (Poland)

Identifiers
- IUPAC name: 4-Methoxynaphthalen-1-yl-(1-pentylindol-3-yl)methanone
- CAS Number: 210179-46-7
- PubChem CID: 10547208
- ChemSpider: 8722599
- UNII: 77E58024IT
- CompTox Dashboard (EPA): DTXSID80175225
- ECHA InfoCard: 100.230.181

Chemical and physical data
- Formula: C_{25}H_{25}NO_{2}
- Molar mass: 371.480 g·mol^{−1}
- 3D model (JSmol): Interactive image
- SMILES: CCCCCn3c1ccccc1c(c3)C(=O)c4c2ccccc2c(OC)cc4
- InChI: InChI=1S/C25H25NO2/c1-3-4-9-16-26-17-22(19-11-7-8-13-23(19)26)25(27)21-14-15-24(28-2)20-12-6-5-10-18(20)21/h5-8,10-15,17H,3-4,9,16H2,1-2H3; Key:UBMPKJKGUQDHRM-UHFFFAOYSA-N

JWH-081 is an analgesic chemical from the naphthoylindole family, which acts as a cannabinoid agonist at both the CB_{1} and CB_{2} receptors. With a K_{i} of 1.2nM it is fairly selective for the CB_{1} subtype, its affinity at this subtype is measured at approximately 10x the affinity at CB_{2}(12.4nM). It was discovered by and named after John W. Huffman.

JWH-081 may be neurotoxic to animals when administered in high doses.

== Legal status ==
In the United States, JWH-081 is a Schedule I Controlled Substance.

As of October 2015, JWH-081 is a controlled substance in China.

== See also ==
- JWH-018
- JWH-098
- JWH-164
- JWH-198
- JWH-210
