= Naphthoylindoles =

Class of chemical compounds

Chemical structure of JWH-018, a simple naphthoylindole

Naphthoylindoles are a class of synthetic cannabinoids.

== Pharmacology ==
Behaving similarly in vivo to endocannabinoids such as anandamide or 2-arachidonoylglycerol (2-AG), naphthoylindoles can bind to endocannabinoid receptors in animals, presenting as CB_{1} and/or CB_{2} partial/full agonists.

== History ==
They have gained notoriety over the years for illicit usage and distribution in Europe and North America, typically marketed as "herbal incense blends."

== See also ==
- Structural scheduling of synthetic cannabinoids
- List of JWH cannabinoids, includes many naphthoylindoles
- Naphthoyl, an acyl group, derived, in this case, from 1-naphthoic acid
- Indole
