= John W. Huffman =

American chemist (1932–2022)

- Born: July 21, 1932
- Died: May 14, 2022 (aged 89)
- Education: BS Northwestern (1954); PhD Harvard (1957)
- Known for: Synthetic cannabinoids
- Scientific career
- Fields: Organic chemistry
- Workplaces: (1957–1960) Georgia Tech (1960–2010) Clemson
- Doctoral advisor: Nobel laureate Robert Woodward

John William Huffman (July 21, 1932 – May 14, 2022) was a professor of organic chemistry at Clemson University who first synthesised novel cannabinoids. His research, funded by the National Institute on Drug Abuse, was focused on making a drug to target endocannabinoid receptors in the body.

== Cannabinoid research ==
Beginning in 1984, Huffman and his team of researchers began synthesizing cannabinoid compounds with delta-9-tetrahydrocannabinol (THC) properties for medical research purposes. Over the course of twenty years, Huffman and his team developed over 400 synthetic cannabinoid compounds which were used as pharmacological tools to study endocannabinoids and cannabinoid receptor genetics. Ultimately, the cannabinoid research provided better understanding of the physiological cannabinoid control system in the human body and brain and opened a path of "elucidating this natural regulatory mechanism in health and disease."

In the late 2000s, two of Huffman's cannabinoid compounds were found in street drugs K2 and Spice being sold in Germany as marijuana alternatives. "I figured once it got started in Germany it was going to spread. I'm concerned that it could hurt people," Huffman said. "I think this was something that was more or less inevitable. It bothers me that people are so stupid as to use this stuff". Huffman may have developed these compounds for scientific research, but as of 2011 he was blamed for its abuse. As JWH-018 is more potent and easy to make, Huffman believes it is a more widely used synthetic cannabinoid of the JWH series.

== Legal advisor ==
More than half a dozen countries had banned herbal blends containing synthetic cannabinoids as of 2010 and many others were also considering banning them. In the US, the states of Kansas, Georgia, Alabama, Tennessee, Missouri, Louisiana, Mississippi, Arkansas, and New York banned K2, herbal incense. JWH-018 was banned by controlled substances act on December 21, 2012.

Law enforcement officials in Canada asked Huffman to serve as a consultant and expert witness. He received numerous media queries and requests for analytical help from law enforcement officials. Huffman planned to provide law officials with updates on JWH advancements following his 2010 retirement.

== See also ==
- List of JWH cannabinoids
