= C24H34O3 =

The molecular formula C_{24}H_{34}O_{3} (molar mass: 370.533 g/mol) may refer to:

- Rimexolone
- Δ9-THCB-O-butanoate
