= THC-VHS =

Synthetic prodrug

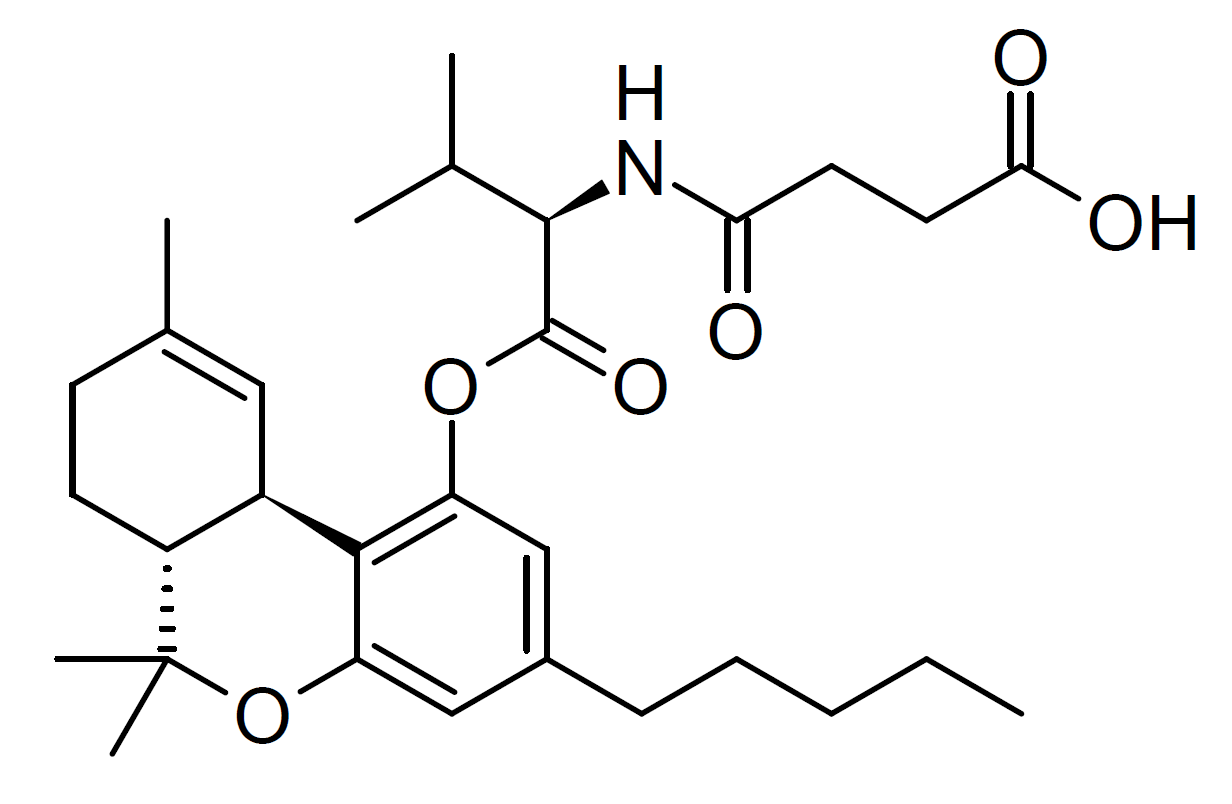

Identifiers
- IUPAC name: 4-{[3-Methyl-1-oxo-1-(6,6,9-trimethyl-3-pentylbenzo[c]chromen-1-yl)oxybutan-2-yl]amino}-4-oxobutanoic acid
- CAS Number: 1225194-84-2
- PubChem CID: 155242207
- UNII: 7268XHE3P7

Chemical and physical data
- Formula: C_{30}H_{39}NO_{6}
- Molar mass: 509.643 g·mol^{−1}
- 3D model (JSmol): Interactive image
- SMILES: CC1(C)Oc2cc(cc(OC(=O)[C@H](NC(=O)CCC(=O)O)C(C)C)c2[C@@H]2C=C(C)CC[C@H]21)CCCCC
- InChI: InChI=1S/C30H43NO6/c1-7-8-9-10-20-16-23(36-29(35)28(18(2)3)31-25(32)13-14-26(33)34)27-21-15-19(4)11-12-22(21)30(5,6)37-24(27)17-20/h15-18,21-22,28H,7-14H2,1-6H3,(H,31,32)(H,33,34)/t21-,22-,28-/m1/s1; Key:QAIKRQKSCBZKKS-DQCZWYHMSA-N

THC valine hemisuccinate (THC-VHS, NB-1111, SBI-100) is a synthetic prodrug of tetrahydrocannabinol, developed at the University of Mississippi as a stabilised formulation for ophthalmic administration, for use in the treatment of glaucoma and other eye conditions requiring reduction in intraocular pressure.

== See also ==
- THC hemisuccinate
- THC-O-acetate
- THC-O-phosphate
- SP-111
- Cod-THC
