= Codrug =

Two synergistic drugs chemically linked together to a single molecule

A codrug consists of two drug moieties, generally "active against the same disease", that are joined through one or more covalent chemical bonds to create a single new chemical entity; they can also be described as a mutual prodrug, recognising that a catabolic biosynthetic step is most often required to liberate the two drugs. While acting against the same disease, the two moities may operate via different mechanisms of action, and so display differing specific therapeutic effects. The recognised advantages of a codrug approach to small molecule drug design include the possibilities of (i) combined efficacies of the two drugs that are therapeutically synergistic, (ii) altered properties that improve the pharmacokinetics (e.g., halflife) of the codrug over its individually administered components (iii) improved modes of drug delivery, and (iv) masking of reactive functional groups of each component drug, possibly improving shelf life (as well as pharmacokinetics).

== Elements of codrug design ==
An effective codrug should be pharmacologically inactive in its own right but should release the constituent drugs upon biochemical breakage of the chemical linkage at the target tissue where their therapeutic effects are needed. As such, the chemical linkage (usually a covalent bond) should be subjectable to biodegradation, such as hydrolysis, by an enzymatic or non-enzymatic mechanism. The differential distribution of enzymes capable of catalyzing the breakage of the chemical linkage in different tissues may be exploited to achieve tissue-specific metabolism of the codrug to release the constituent drugs.

== Common codrugs ==
- Sulfasalazine: Sulfapyridine linked via an azo group to 5-aminosalicylic acid.
- Alpha-GPC: Choline linked to glycero-3-phosphate.
- Benorylate: Paracetamol linked via esterification to acetylsalicylic acid.
- Cod-THC: THC linked via a carbonate group to codeine.
- Fenethylline: Amphetamine linked to theophylline.
- Sultamicillin: ampicillin linked via esterification to sulbactam.
- Cefilavancin: a vancomycin derived antibiotic linked to a cephalosporin antibiotic.
- Rifaquizinone: a rifamycin derived antibiotic linked to a quinolone antibiotic.
- Proglumetacin: indometacin linked to proglumide
- Dimenhydrinate: Diphenhydramine formed into a salt with 8-chlorotheophylline

== See also ==
- Combination drug
- Small molecule drug conjugate
- Drug synergy
- Ampicillin/sulbactam
