= Vigo Ordnance Plant =

U.S. Army weapons plant

Coordinates: 39°21′32″N 87°24′40″W

The Vigo Ordnance Plant, also known as the Vigo Chemical Plant or simply the Vigo Plant, was a United States Army facility built in 1942 to produce conventional weapons. In 1944 it was converted to produce biological agents for the U.S. bioweapons program. Although the plant never actually produced bioweapons before the end of World War II, it did produce 8,000 pounds of an anthrax simulant. After the war, the plant was transferred to Pfizer, who operated it until the plant's closure in 2008.

== Location ==
The Vigo Ordnance Plant was located on 700 acres (2.8 km^{2}) of a more than 6,000-acre (24 km^{2}) government-owned tract and cost $21 million to build (the equivalent of $366 million in 2023). The facility was constructed in the Honey Creek Township in Vigo County, Indiana. The plant was located about six miles (10 km) south of Terre Haute. The area surrounding the plant was flat, covered with cornfields, and dotted by hog farms. The site of the former Vigo Plant is south of Interstate 70 near Highway 41 and Indiana State Highways 150 and 63.

== History ==
=== Construction and conversion ===
The U.S. Army Ordnance Corps constructed the Vigo Plant in 1942, prior to the official start of the U.S. biological weapons program. The Vigo Ordnance Plant began producing conventional explosives and munitions on February 18, 1942. The Army decommissioned the factory less than year later, and on June 30, 1943, the plant was transferred to the U.S. Army Corps of Engineers. Portions of the Vigo Plant were then leased to the Delco Radio Corporation for the manufacture of military electronics equipment. The plant served in this capacity until May 1944.

On May 8, 1944, the Army Special Projects Division (SPD) directed the Vigo Plant to convert its facilities for full-scale biological agent production. The plant was converted for biological warfare (BW) use by the H.K. Ferguson Construction Company; they added fermenter tanks, slurry heaters, laboratories, and the other necessities of a biological warfare facility. The plant was to be the first U.S. anthrax factory and would be utilized to fill a British order for anthrax bombs. In March 1944 the British had placed an order for 500,000 of these bombs, which Winston Churchill remarked should only be considered a "first installment".

=== Bio-weapons production ===
When it was conceived, the initial plan was for the Vigo Plant to be a production facility for anthrax and botulinum toxin. The 1944 order converting the plant to a BW facility directed that it become a factory capable of producing 275,000 botulin bombs or one million anthrax bombs per month. The core of the Vigo Plant's BW operation was the anthrax fermenters installed during the renovations in 1944. There were twelve 20,000-gallon fermenter tanks at Vigo, for a total of 240,000 gallons, which made it the largest bacterial mass-production line anywhere in the world at the time.

After U.S. BW scientists worked through the problems presented by trying to mass-produce bombs that were to be filled with a deadly biological agent, the production line was essentially ready to operate. The line would fill the British four-pound anthrax bombs with an anthrax slurry and then cluster them into the M26 cluster adapter to form the M33 cluster bomb. Before production could begin, however, safety testing commenced. The scientific director of the U.S. BW program, Ira Baldwin, selected Walter Nevius, a specialist in pathogen containment, to lead the safety inspections, which began when he arrived at Vigo in the summer of 1944.

Nevius was considered conscientious, so much so that at one point the Army wanted to replace him; this resulted in Baldwin resigning his position and becoming an "advisor" to the U.S. BW program. The testing regimen that followed extended well into 1945. The first tests ran water through the system to ensure there were no leaks. A second round of tests was run with an anthrax simulant, Bacillus globigii. The plant was pronounced watertight by Nevius in April 1945, and trial runs with the simulant began in June.

By the time the plant was ready to produce the simulant, the end of World War II was on the horizon. The plant was able to produce about 8,000 pounds of B. globgii before production was halted in October 1945, but was never able to produce any BW agents, including anthrax, before the war ended. As October 1945 ended, approximately $800,000 worth of equipment at Vigo was declared surplus. Eighteen boxcars were loaded with caustics, sulfuric acid, bleach, tributyl phosphate, and 765,000 explosive detonators and shipped elsewhere for storage. The Vigo Ordnance plant was placed on "standby" in December 1945; in reality, the demilitarization process had already begun.

=== Demilitarization ===
The plant remained on standby to produce "highly classified material", and in February 1947, four areas of the plant were declared restricted. On April 30, 1947, demilitarization of the Vigo Plant began; this allowed prospective buyers to inspect the site. Even with the earlier equipment removal, the fermenters remained behind. On December 15, 1947, the Pfizer company executed a 20-year lease agreement with the government to take over the Vigo site. The company would begin antibiotic manufacture at Vigo in 1948, but the military continued to liquidate the surrounding land into 1949. That year a 1,500-acre (6.1 km^{2}) tract was acquired by the Bureau of Prisons to be used as agricultural land; other portions of the Vigo property were acquired by various private entities. The BW production facilities at Vigo were eventually replaced by a more modern factory at Pine Bluff Arsenal in 1954.

== Pfizer's ownership ==
After the lease agreement and later the sale of the plant were finalized, the company transferred John E. McKeen to the Vigo site in 1948 in preparation for the production of streptomycin. The main objective of Pfizer's Vigo operation in the years after the war was the production of veterinary antibiotics. The large fermenters were used during the period after the war to produce penicillin but afterwards sat dormant for decades. Of the areas at Vigo not utilized by Pfizer, most were left undisturbed. Adjacent to the old BW buildings, the company constructed their own facilities for drug manufacturing.

After operating the Vigo plant since 1948, Pfizer announced in October 2007 that 600 of the plant's 750 employees would be placed on paid leave. The announcement followed disappointing sales for the plant's flagship product, an inhaled insulin known as Exubera. Beginning in 1999, Pfizer had invested $300 million in the plant and hired 400 additional employees, Pfizer's Vigo location was declared the sole producer of Exubera. In January 2008 those employees on paid leave were permanently eliminated. The company announced in May 2008 the remaining 140 jobs, occupied making antibiotics Cefobid and Unasyn, at the plant would be eliminated and the plant closed. In November 2008 the company announced the site and its buildings were for sale.

== Russian tour ==
Per a 1994 arms-control agreement between the United States and Russia, each nation was permitted to inspect three sites in the other country that it suspected were biological warfare facilities. The Russians chose to tour Pfizer's main research center in Groton, Connecticut, the Plum Island facilities, including Building 101, and the Vigo Ordnance Plant. The Russians were shown the decrepit military facilities at Vigo, many of which were shuttered, padlocked, and in an obvious state of disrepair. When the Russians observed the fermenters, they asserted that it was evidence of a secret, illegal U.S. BW program. The Russian reaction to the tours, in general, was not good, and a negative report of their visit followed when they returned to Russia. The report maintained that the facilities could potentially be used for BW.

== See also ==
- Fort Detrick
- Fort Terry
- Granite Peak Installation
- Horn Island Testing Station
- Plum Island Animal Disease Center
