= Cod-THC =

Synthetic chemical compound

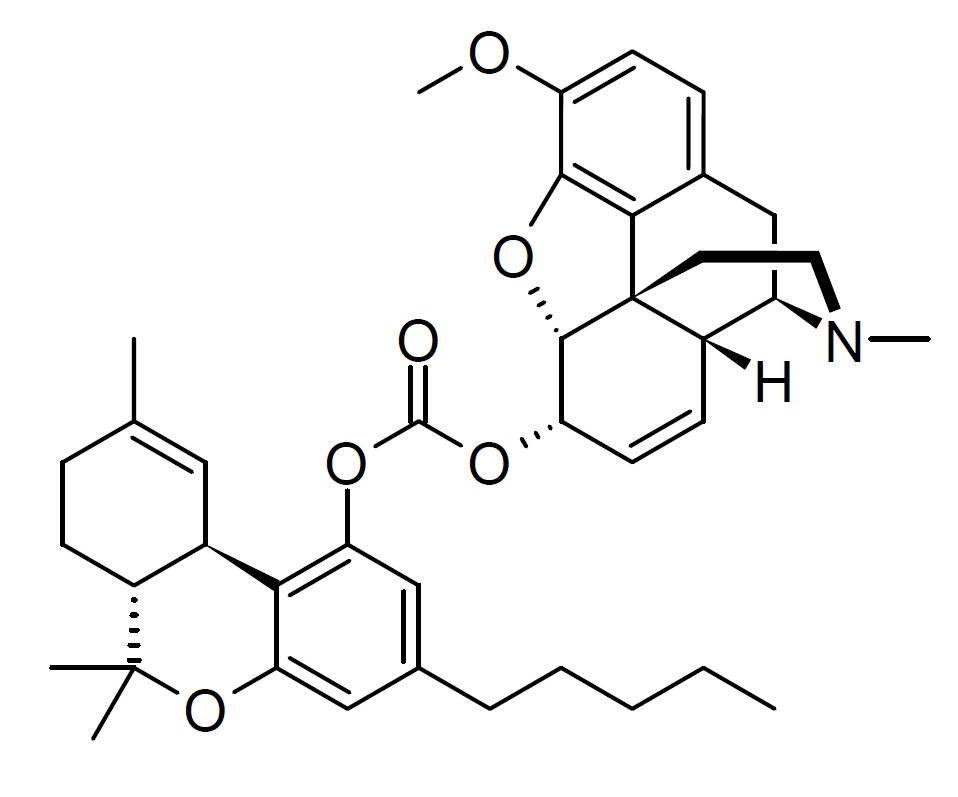

Identifiers
- IUPAC name: [(4R,4aR,7S,7aR,12bS)-9-methoxy-3-methyl-2,4,4a,7,7a,13-hexahydro-1H-4,12-methanobenzofuro[3,2-e]isoquinolin-7-yl] [(6aR,10aR)-6,6,9-trimethyl-3-pentyl-6a,7,8,10a-tetrahydrobenzo[c]chromen-1-yl] carbonate
- PubChem CID: 143656467

Chemical and physical data
- Formula: C_{40}H_{49}NO_{6}
- Molar mass: 639.833 g·mol^{−1}
- 3D model (JSmol): Interactive image
- SMILES: CN1CC[C@@]23c4c5C[C@@H]1[C@@H]2C=C[C@H](OC(=O)Oc1cc(CCCCC)cc2OC(C)(C)[C@@H]6CCC(C)=C[C@H]6c21)[C@@H]3Oc4c(OC)cc5
- InChI: InChI=InChI=1S/C40H49NO6/c1-7-8-9-10-24-20-32(34-26-19-23(2)11-13-27(26)39(3,4)47-33(34)21-24)45-38(42)44-31-16-14-28-29-22-25-12-15-30(43-6)36-35(25)40(28,37(31)46-36)17-18-41(29)5/h12,14-16,19-21,26-29,31,37H,7-11,13,17-18,22H2,1-6H3/t26-,27-,28+,29-,31+,37+,40+/m1/s1; Key:VDTVNOCXWSYPQX-IWHNUUHWSA-N

Cod-THC (Codeine Δ^{9}-tetrahydrocannabinol carbonate) is a synthetic codrug formed by linking tetrahydrocannabinol with codeine via a carbonate bridge. It is well absorbed orally and shows superior analgesic effects in animal studies compared to a simple mixture of the two drugs.

THC can partially inhibit CYP2D6, which is the enzyme that transforms codeine into its active metabolite morphine. It's not well understood how THC may impact codeines metabolism in humans.

== See also ==
- Benorilate
- Codeine-6-glucuronide
- Fenethylline
- THC-methylcarbonate
- THC-O-acetate
- THC-VHS
