= Unasyn =

Unasyn is the trade name for two related antibiotic drugs:

- Ampicillin/sulbactam, a fixed-dose combination medication of the penicillin antibiotic combination ampicillin/sulbactam
- Sultamicillin, an oral form of the penicillin antibiotic combination ampicillin/sulbactam
