= C26H36O3 =

The molecular formula C_{26}H_{36}O_{3} (molar mass: 396.571 g/mol) may refer to:

- Estradiol cypionate
- 2-Allyl-Δ8-THC-O-acetate
