= THC morpholinylbutyrate =

Synthetic derivative of tetrahydrocannabinol

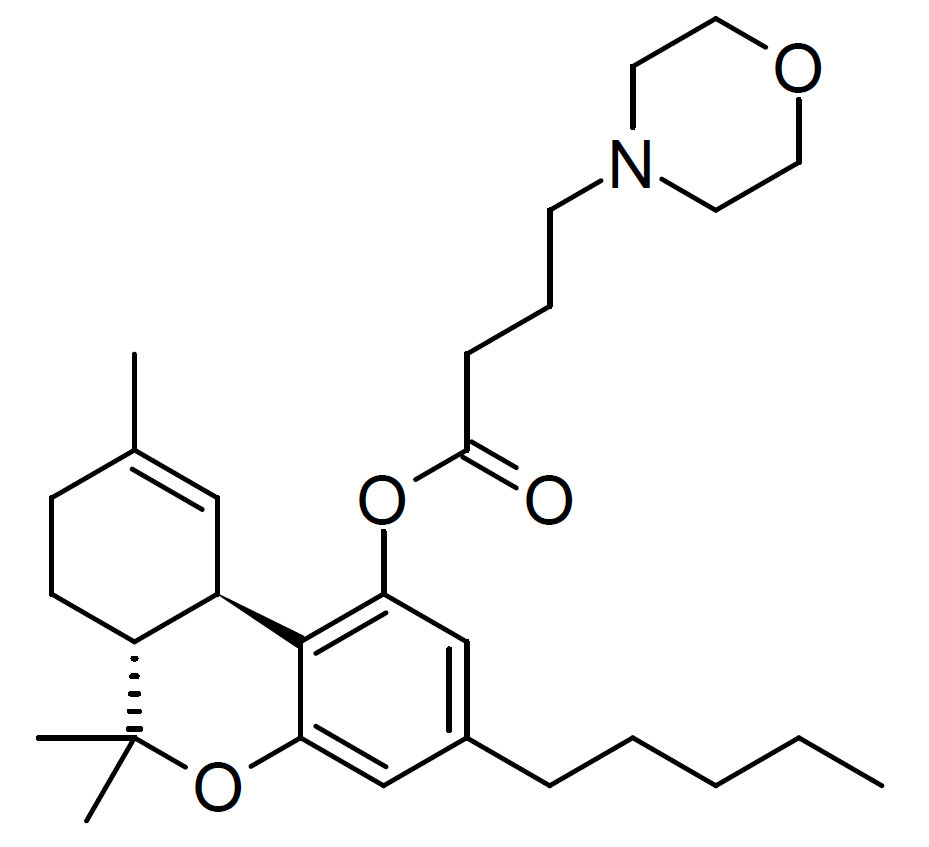

Identifiers
- IUPAC name: [(6aR,10aR)-6,6,9-trimethyl-3-pentyl-6a,7,8,10a-tetrahydrobenzo[c]chromen-1-yl] 4-morpholin-4-ylbutanoate
- CAS Number: 55602-38-5
- PubChem CID: 6453212
- ChemSpider: 4955601
- UNII: 77FJY4KZ74
- ChEMBL: ChEMBL3301967
- CompTox Dashboard (EPA): DTXSID30204150

Chemical and physical data
- Formula: C_{29}H_{43}NO_{4}
- Molar mass: 469.666 g·mol^{−1}
- 3D model (JSmol): Interactive image
- SMILES: CCCCCC1=CC2=C([C@@H]3C=C(CC[C@H]3C(O2)(C)C)C)C(=C1)OC(=O)CCCN4CCOCC4
- InChI: InChI=1S/C29H43NO4/c1-5-6-7-9-22-19-25(33-27(31)10-8-13-30-14-16-32-17-15-30)28-23-18-21(2)11-12-24(23)29(3,4)34-26(28)20-22/h18-20,23-24H,5-17H2,1-4H3/t23-,24-/m1/s1; Key:HAQNKTBQOIAWDB-DNQXCXABSA-N

THC morpholinylbutyrate (SP-111, Δ^{9}-THC-O-[4-(morpholin-4-yl)butyrate]) is a synthetic derivative of tetrahydrocannabinol, developed in the 1970s. It is a prodrug which is converted into THC inside the body, and was one of the first derivatives of THC that is able to form water-soluble salts, giving it a significant advantage over THC for some applications. However, it is less potent than THC and the metabolic conversion to THC is relatively slow and variable, giving it unpredictable pharmacokinetics which has limited its research applications.

== See also ==
- Δ9-THCB-O-butanoate
- THC-O-acetate
- THC-O-phosphate
- THC hemisuccinate
- THC methylcarbonate
- THC-VHS
- Nabitan
- O-1057
