= 1'-Dimethyl-Δ9-THCH =

Identifiers
- IUPAC name: (6aR,10aR)-6,6,9-trimethyl-3-(2-methylheptan-2-yl)-6a,7,8,9,10,10a-hexahydrobenzo[c]chromen-1-ol

Chemical and physical data
- Formula: C_{24}H_{36}O_{2}
- Molar mass: 356.550 g·mol^{−1}
- 3D model (JSmol): Interactive image
- SMILES: CC1(C)Oc2cc(cc(O)c2[C@@H]2C=C(C)CC[C@H]21)C(C)(C)CCCCC

1'-Dimethyl-Δ9-THCH (1',1'-Dimethyl-Δ^{9}-THCH) is a drug that is a cannabinoid agonist, and has been sold as a designer drug. It is closely related to Δ^{9}-THCH but with two methyl groups added on to the hexyl chain at the carbon adjacent to the aromatic ring, and is also structurally similar to other potent cannabinoid drugs such as dimethylheptylpyran and HU-210. While 1',1'-dimethyl-Δ^{8}-THCH is a known compound with established cannabinoid effects, the Δ^{9} isomer appears to be previously unreported. In 2025 it was detected and reported to the Public Health Agency of Sweden. It was added to the controlled drugs list in Hungary in 2026.

== See also ==
- Δ8-THC-DMH
- (C6)-CP 47,497
- 2-Allyl-Δ8-THC-O-acetate
- 2-Cl-HHC
- Adamantyl-HHC
- AM-087
- AMG-41
- JWH-133
- THC butanenitrile oxime
