= Adamantyl-HHC =

Identifiers
- IUPAC name: (6aR,10aR)-6,6,9-trimethyl-3-(1-adamantyl)-6a,7,8,9,10,10a-hexahydrobenzo[c]chromen-1-ol

Chemical and physical data
- Formula: C_{26}H_{36}O_{2}
- Molar mass: 380.572 g·mol^{−1}
- 3D model (JSmol): Interactive image
- SMILES: CC1(C)Oc2cc(cc(O)c2[C@@H]2CC(C)CC[C@H]21)C12CC3CC(CC(C3)C2)C1

Adamantyl-HHC is a drug that is a cannabinoid agonist, and has been sold as a designer drug. It is closely related to AM-411 (adamantyl-Δ8-THC) but with the saturated ring system found in hexahydrocannabinol (HHC) and related compounds. While AM-411 and numerous other derivatives with adamantyl or similar substituents replacing the pentyl side chain have been reported in the scientific literature, adamantyl-HHC itself does not appear to have been previously reported prior to its appearance as a designer drug in 2026. It is one of a number of novel compounds from the "classical" cannabinoid group structurally related to THC which have appeared following bans on previously legal semi-synthetic derivatives such as Δ8-THC and HHC, and has been added to the list of controlled drugs in several jurisdictions such as Hungary, Czech Republic and Turkey.

== See also ==
- 1'-Dimethyl-Δ9-THCH
- 2-Allyl-Δ8-THC-O-acetate
- 2-Cl-HHC
- THC butanenitrile oxime
