= AM-7438 =

Chemical compound

Identifiers
- IUPAC name: 3-cyanopropyl 2-[(6aR,10aR)-1-hydroxy-6,6,9-trimethyl-6a,7,10,10a-tetrahydrobenzo[c]chromen-3-yl]-2-methylpropanoate
- CAS Number: 1577225-74-1
- PubChem CID: 89994983
- ChemSpider: 76787992
- ChEMBL: ChEMBL4071389
- CompTox Dashboard (EPA): DTXSID001336579

Chemical and physical data
- Formula: C_{24}H_{31}NO_{4}
- Molar mass: 397.515 g·mol^{−1}
- 3D model (JSmol): Interactive image
- SMILES: CC1=CC[C@@H]2[C@@H](C1)C3=C(C=C(C=C3OC2(C)C)C(C)(C)C(=O)OCCCC#N)O
- InChI: InChI=1S/C24H31NO4/c1-15-8-9-18-17(12-15)21-19(26)13-16(14-20(21)29-24(18,4)5)23(2,3)22(27)28-11-7-6-10-25/h8,13-14,17-18,26H,6-7,9,11-12H2,1-5H3/t17-,18-/m1/s1; Key:PGSJGFYQNYPKOJ-QZTJIDSGSA-N

AM-7438 is a drug which is a cannabinoid receptor agonist, developed by the research team led by Dr Alexandros Makriyannis. It is a derivative of Δ8-THC which has been substituted with a side chain containing a metabolically labile ester group, allowing the molecule to be rapidly metabolised to an inactive form, in a similar manner to drugs such as remifentanil, remimazolam and SN 35210. This means that while AM-7438 retains potent cannabinoid effects, it has a much shorter duration of action than most related compounds.

== See also ==
- THC butanenitrile oxime
