= Sultamicillin =

Chemical compound

Clinical data
- Trade names: Unasyn, Unacid PD oral
- AHFS/Drugs.com: International Drug Names
- Routes of administration: By mouth
- ATC code: J01CR04 (WHO)

Pharmacokinetic data
- Bioavailability: 80%
- Excretion: Mainly via kidney

Identifiers
- IUPAC name: [(2R)-3,3-Dimethyl-4,4,7-trioxy-4λ^{6}-thia-1-azabicyclo[3.2.0]heptane-2-carbonyl]oxymethyl(2R)-6-{[(2S)-2-amino-2-phenyl-acetyl]amino}-3,3-dimethyl-7-oxo-4-thia-1-azabicyclo[3.2.0]heptane-2-carboxylate
- CAS Number: 76497-13-7
- PubChem CID: 444022
- ChemSpider: 392048
- UNII: 65DT0ML581
- KEGG: D05972
- ChEBI: CHEBI:51770
- ChEMBL: ChEMBL506110
- CompTox Dashboard (EPA): DTXSID501010077

Chemical and physical data
- Formula: C_{25}H_{30}N_{4}O_{9}S_{2}
- Molar mass: 594.65 g·mol^{−1}
- 3D model (JSmol): Interactive image
- SMILES: O=C(OCOC(=O)[C@@H]2N1C(=O)C[C@H]1S(=O)(=O)C2(C)C)[C@@H]4N5C(=O)[C@@H](NC(=O)[C@@H](c3ccccc3)N)[C@H]5SC4(C)C
- InChI: InChI=1S/C25H30N4O9S2/c1-24(2)17(29-20(32)16(21(29)39-24)27-19(31)15(26)12-8-6-5-7-9-12)22(33)37-11-38-23(34)18-25(3,4)40(35,36)14-10-13(30)28(14)18/h5-9,14-18,21H,10-11,26H2,1-4H3,(H,27,31)/t14-,15-,16-,17+,18+,21-/m1/s1; Key:OPYGFNJSCUDTBT-PMLPCWDUSA-N

Sultamicillin, sold under the brand name Unasyn among others, is an oral form of the penicillin antibiotic combination ampicillin/sulbactam. It is used for the treatment of bacterial infections of the upper and lower respiratory tract, the kidneys and urinary tract, skin and soft tissues, among other organs. More specifically, it is an ester codrug of ampicillin and sulbactam.

Sultamicillin is better absorbed from the gut than ampicillin/sulbactam, decreasing the chances of diarrhea and dysentery. The inclusion of sulbactam extends ampicillin's spectrum of action to beta-lactamase producing strains of bacteria. Oral sulbactam with the intravenous form provides a regimen of continuous sulbactam therapy throughout the treatment, resulting in better clinical results.

It was patented in 1979 and approved for medical use in 1987.

== Medical uses ==
Medical uses for sultamicillin include:

- Skin and soft tissue infections - furuncles, carbuncles, cellulitis, paronychia, impetigo contagiosa, diabetic foot ulcers and abscesses caused by Staphylococcus aureus and Streptococcus pyogenes.
- Upper respiratory tract infections - pharyngitis and tonsillitis caused by Streptococcus pyogenes and Staphylococcus aureus. Acute and chronic sinusitis caused by Staphylococcus aureus, Streptococcus pneumoniae, Haemophilus influenzae and S. pyogenes. Otitis media, particularly suppurative otitis media, with or without mastoiditis antrum.
- Lower respiratory tract infections - bacterial pneumonias, bronchitis, bronchiectasis caused by Streptococcus pneumoniae, Haemophilus influenzae, Staphylococcus aureus and S. pyogenes. Acute exacerbations of COPD.
- Urinary tract infections - pyelonephritis, cystitis caused by Escherichia coli, Proteus mirabilis, Klebsiella and Staphylococcus aureus.
- Surgical infections - prophylaxis and treatment of surgical site infections, peri-operative prophylaxis in orthopaedic and cardiovascular surgery.
- Gynecological infections - Caused by beta-lactamase producing strains of E. coli and Bacteroides sp. (including Bacteroides fragilis).
- Infections of the gastrointestinal tract - Bacterial esophagitis, treatment of Helicobacter pylori infections as a part of MDT in ulcer management.

== Contraindications ==
Sultamicillin is contraindicated in people with penicillin allergy and those with mononucleosis, as these have an increased risk of developing severe rashes.

== Adverse effects ==
The most common side effect, as with many other antibiotics, is diarrhoea and soft stool. In Japanese clinical trials, these occurred with a frequency of 3.7% and 1.1%, respectively; however, in studies outside Japan, diarrhoea was much more common at 10% to over 50% in patients taking sultamicillin. Other adverse effects occurring in the range of 1 to 10% of people include nausea, vomiting, stomach ache, headache, rashes, and infections with Candida albicans. Haemorrhagic colitis caused by Clostridioides difficile infections is a rare complication.

== Interactions ==
Interactions with other drugs are similar to other penicillins: allopurinol increases the risk for patients to develop rashes. Penicillins slow down the elimination of methotrexate, potentially increasing its adverse effects. Conversely, the elimination of sultamicillin's active constituents (ampicillin and sulbactam) is reduced by probenecid and probably by the nonsteroidal anti-inflammatory drugs (NSAIDs) aspirin, indometacin and phenylbutazone.

== Pharmacology ==
=== Pharmacokinetics ===
The constituents of sultamicillin: ampicillin (blue), sulbactam (red), and the acylal link (black).

Sultamicillin is a codrug or (mutual prodrug) of ampicillin and sulbactam. After oral intake, it is absorbed and hydrolytically cleaved to ampicillin and sulbactam by enzymes in the gut wall. These two substances are then released into the system in a 1:1 molar ratio. Their pharmacokinetic behaviour is similar (and practically independent of food intake): they reach peak concentrations after about one hour; their plasma protein binding is 26% (ampicillin) and 29% (sulbactam); and their elimination half-lives are 45–80 minutes and 40–70 minutes, respectively. Both drugs are mainly eliminated via the kidneys: within eight hours after intake, 46 to 80% of the ampicillin and 41 to 66% of the sulbactam are found in the urine.

=== Mechanism of action ===
Ampicillin, a semi-synthetic orally active broad-spectrum penicillin antibiotic, exerts antibacterial activity against sensitive organisms by inhibiting biosynthesis of cell wall mucopeptide. Sulbactam, a beta-lactamase inhibitor, irreversibly inhibits many beta-lactamases that occur in resistant bacteria strains.

== Chemistry ==
Ampicillin and sulbactam are linked via a methylene group, forming two ester bonds (or more accurately acylal bonds). Sultamicillin is used in form of the tosylate salt.
