= Cefilavancin =

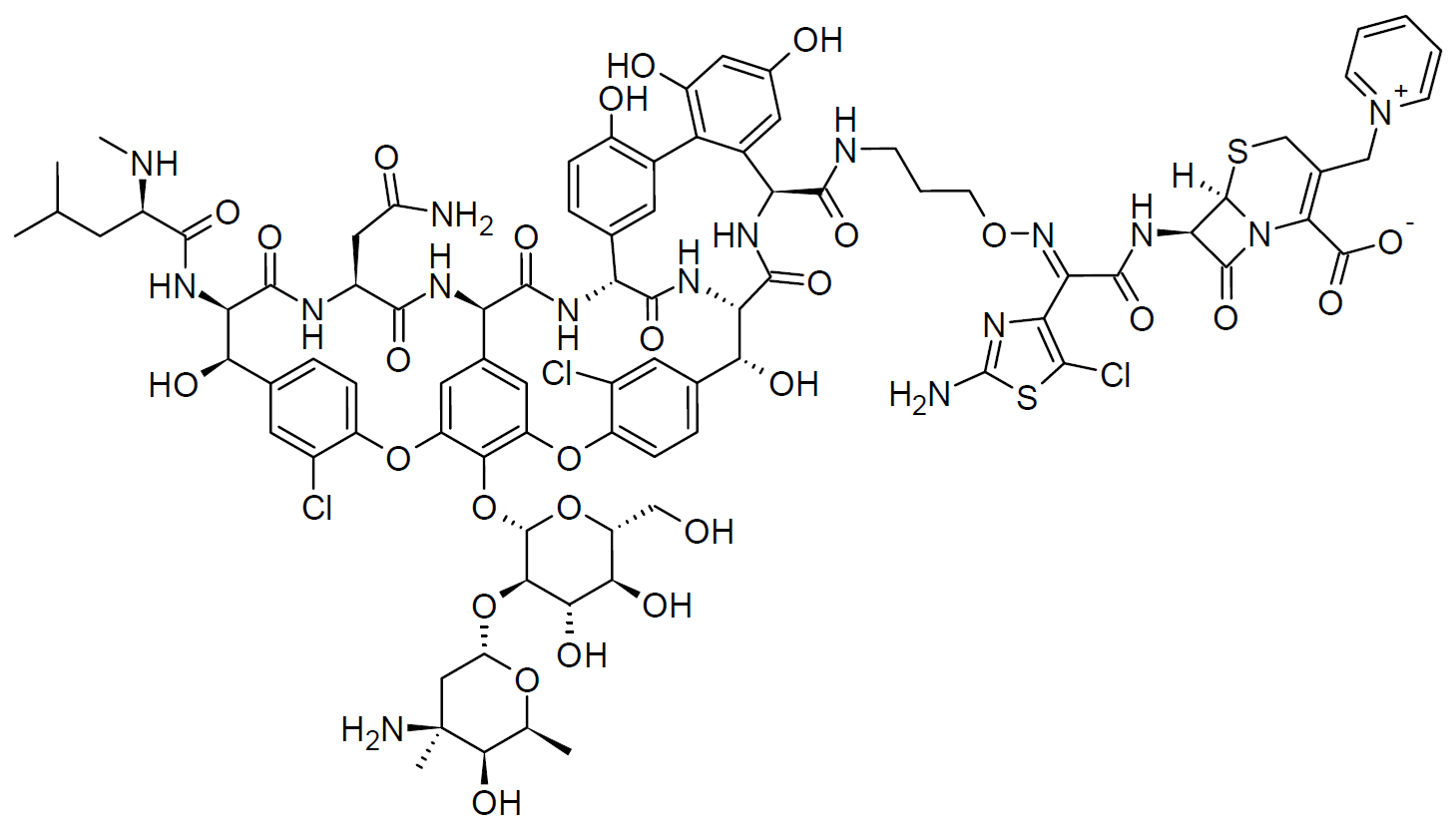

Clinical data
- Other names: TD-1792
- Routes of administration: Intravenous

Identifiers
- IUPAC name: (6R,7R)-7-[[(2Z)-2-(2-amino-5-chloro-1,3-thiazol-4-yl)-2-[3-[[(1S,2R,18R,19R,22S,25R,28R,40S)-48-[(2S,3R,4S,5S,6R)-3-[(2S,4S,5S,6S)-4-amino-5-hydroxy-4,6-dimethyloxan-2-yl]oxy-4,5-dihydroxy-6-(hydroxymethyl)oxan-2-yl]oxy-22-(2-amino-2-oxoethyl)-5,15-dichloro-2,18,32,35,37-pentahydroxy-19-[[(2R)-4-methyl-2-(methylamino)pentanoyl]amino]-20,23,26,42,44-pentaoxo-7,13-dioxa-21,24,27,41,43-pentazaoctacyclo[26.14.2.2^{3,6}.2^{14,17}.1^{8,12}.1^{29,33}.0^{10,25}.0^{34,39}]pentaconta-3,5,8(48),9,11,14,16,29(45),30,32,34(39),35,37,46,49-pentadecaene-40-carbonyl]amino]propoxyimino]acetyl]amino]-8-oxo-3-(pyridin-1-ium-1-ylmethyl)-5-thia-1-azabicyclo[4.2.0]oct-2-ene-2-carboxylate
- CAS Number: 722454-12-8
- PubChem CID: 76960417
- DrugBank: DB05735
- ChemSpider: 34990483
- UNII: F76229E21M
- ChEMBL: ChEMBL4297645

Chemical and physical data
- Formula: C_{87}H_{95}Cl_{3}N_{16}O_{28}S_{2}
- Molar mass: 1983.27 g·mol^{−1}
- 3D model (JSmol): Interactive image
- SMILES: C[C@H]1[C@H]([C@@](C[C@@H](O1)O[C@@H]2[C@H]([C@@H]([C@H](O[C@H]2OC3=C4C=C5C=C3OC6=C(C=C(C=C6)[C@H]([C@H](C(=O)N[C@H](C(=O)N[C@H]5C(=O)N[C@@H]7C8=CC(=C(C=C8)O)C9=C(C=C(C=C9O)O)[C@H](NC(=O)[C@H]([C@@H](C1=CC(=C(O4)C=C1)Cl)O)NC7=O)C(=O)NCCCO/N=C(/C1=C(SC(=N1)N)Cl)\C(=O)N[C@H]1[C@@H]2N(C1=O)C(=C(CS2)C[N+]1=CC=CC=C1)C(=O)[O-])CC(=O)N)NC(=O)[C@@H](CC(C)C)NC)O)Cl)CO)O)O)(C)N)O
- InChI: InChI=1S/C87H95Cl3N16O28S2/c1-33(2)20-45(94-5)74(117)100-62-66(112)36-11-14-49(43(88)22-36)130-51-24-38-25-52(70(51)134-85-71(69(115)68(114)53(31-107)132-85)133-55-29-87(4,93)72(116)34(3)129-55)131-50-15-12-37(23-44(50)89)67(113)63-81(124)99-59(42-26-40(108)27-48(110)56(42)41-21-35(10-13-47(41)109)57(77(120)101-63)98-78(121)58(38)97-75(118)46(28-54(91)111)96-80(62)123)76(119)95-16-9-19-128-104-61(60-73(90)136-86(92)103-60)79(122)102-64-82(125)106-65(84(126)127)39(32-135-83(64)106)30-105-17-7-6-8-18-105/h6-8,10-15,17-18,21-27,33-34,45-46,53,55,57-59,62-64,66-69,71-72,83,85,94,107,112-116H,9,16,19-20,28-32,93H2,1-5H3,(H15-,91,92,95,96,97,98,99,100,101,102,103,104,108,109,110,111,117,118,119,120,121,122,123,124,126,127)/t34-,45+,46-,53+,55-,57+,58+,59-,62+,63-,64+,66+,67+,68+,69-,71+,72+,83+,85-,87-/m0/s1; Key:OGUAFUAJSPORAH-KHCCTVBNSA-N

Cefilavancin (TD-1792) is an experimental antibiotic medication developed for the treatment of bacterial infections such as drug-resistant strains of Staphylococcus aureus. It is a prodrug which is also a codrug, injected intravenously and then cleaved inside the body to two active components, one of which is a modified form of vancomycin and the other a cephalosporin antibiotic. In clinical trials cefilavancin has shown similar efficacy with reduced side effects compared to vancomycin itself.

== See also ==
- Rifaquizinone
