= THC butanenitrile oxime =

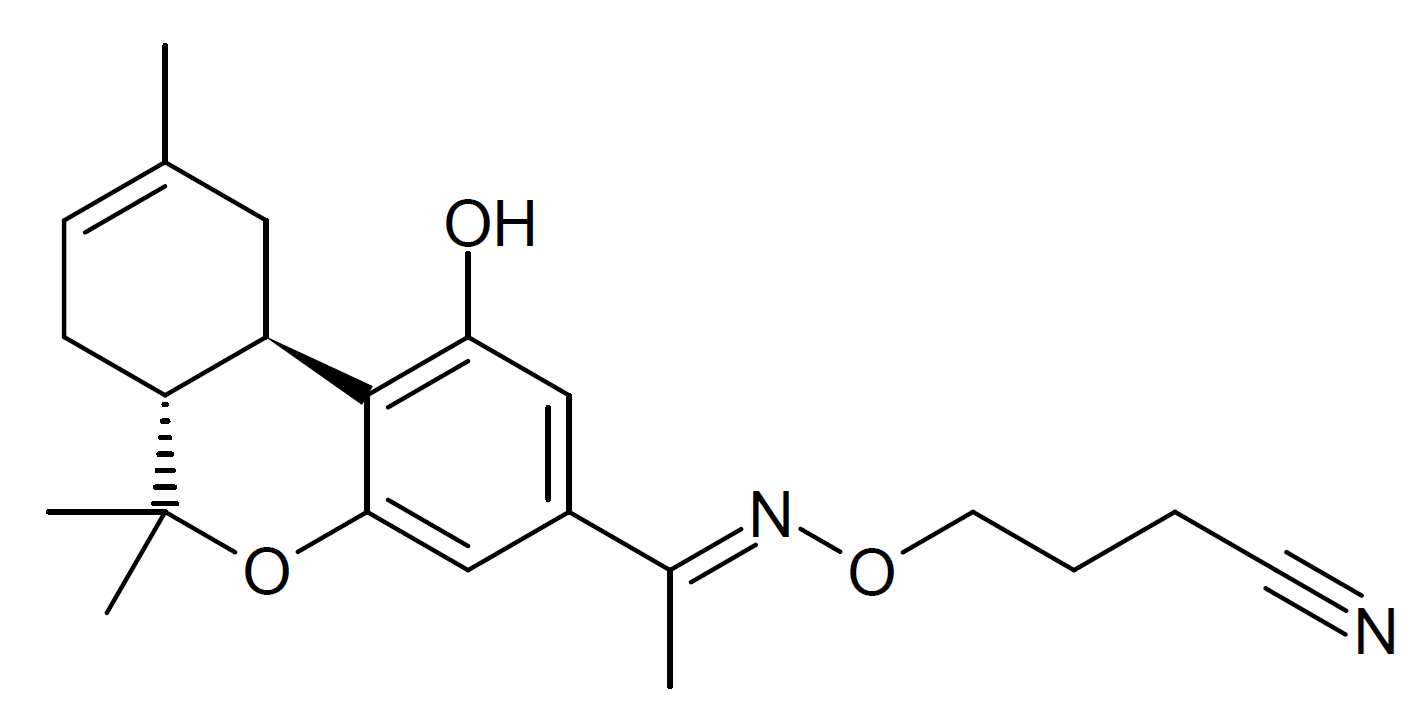

Identifiers
- IUPAC name: 4-[(E)-1-[(6aR,10aR)-1-hydroxy-6,6,9-trimethyl-6a,7,10,10a-tetrahydrobenzo[c]chromen-3-yl]ethylideneamino]oxybutanenitrile
- PubChem CID: 145984840
- ChemSpider: 90662294
- ChEMBL: ChEMBL4249273

Chemical and physical data
- Formula: C_{22}H_{28}N_{2}O_{3}
- Molar mass: 368.477 g·mol^{−1}
- 3D model (JSmol): Interactive image
- SMILES: CC1(C)Oc2cc(cc(O)c2[C@@H]2CC(C)=CC[C@H]21)/C(C)=N/OCCCC#N
- InChI: InChI=1S/C22H28N2O3/c1-14-7-8-18-17(11-14)21-19(25)12-16(13-20(21)27-22(18,3)4)15(2)24-26-10-6-5-9-23/h7,12-13,17-18,25H,5-6,8,10-11H2,1-4H3/b24-15+/t17-,18-/m0/s1; Key:BPUPSNATXJVJDE-WGCRICIGSA-N

THC butanenitrile oxime (Tetrahydrocannaboxime, THCO) is a drug which is a cannabinoid receptor agonist. The isomer Δ^{8}-THC butanenitrile oxime was originally synthesised by the research team led by Dr Alexandros Makriyannis in 2018 as a shorter lasting analogue of THC with a readily metabolized oxime link forming part of the side chain, allowing it to be more easily broken down by the body and thus shortening its duration of action.

Subsequently it has appeared as a designer drug, initially in Germany and Russia, with both the Δ^{8} and Δ^{9} isomers being reported, sometimes with the active (6aR,10aR) trans enantiomer in a racemic mix with the inactive (6aS,10aS) trans enantiomer, and/or as a mixture of the E- and Z-isomeric oximes, presumably as a result of poorly controlled synthesis.

It has been marketed as "THC oxime" or "THCO" which may cause confusion with O-acetyl-THC (commonly sold as "THC-O"), and has sometimes been misrepresented as a semi-synthetic product, even though unlike O-acetyl-THC, the published synthesis routes for THC butanenitrile oxime are entirely synthetic and do not originate from cannabidiol or other natural products extracted from Cannabis plant material.

Both the Δ^{8} and Δ^{9} isomers of THC butanenitrile oxime have been added to the controlled drug list in several jurisdictions such as Hungary and Turkey.

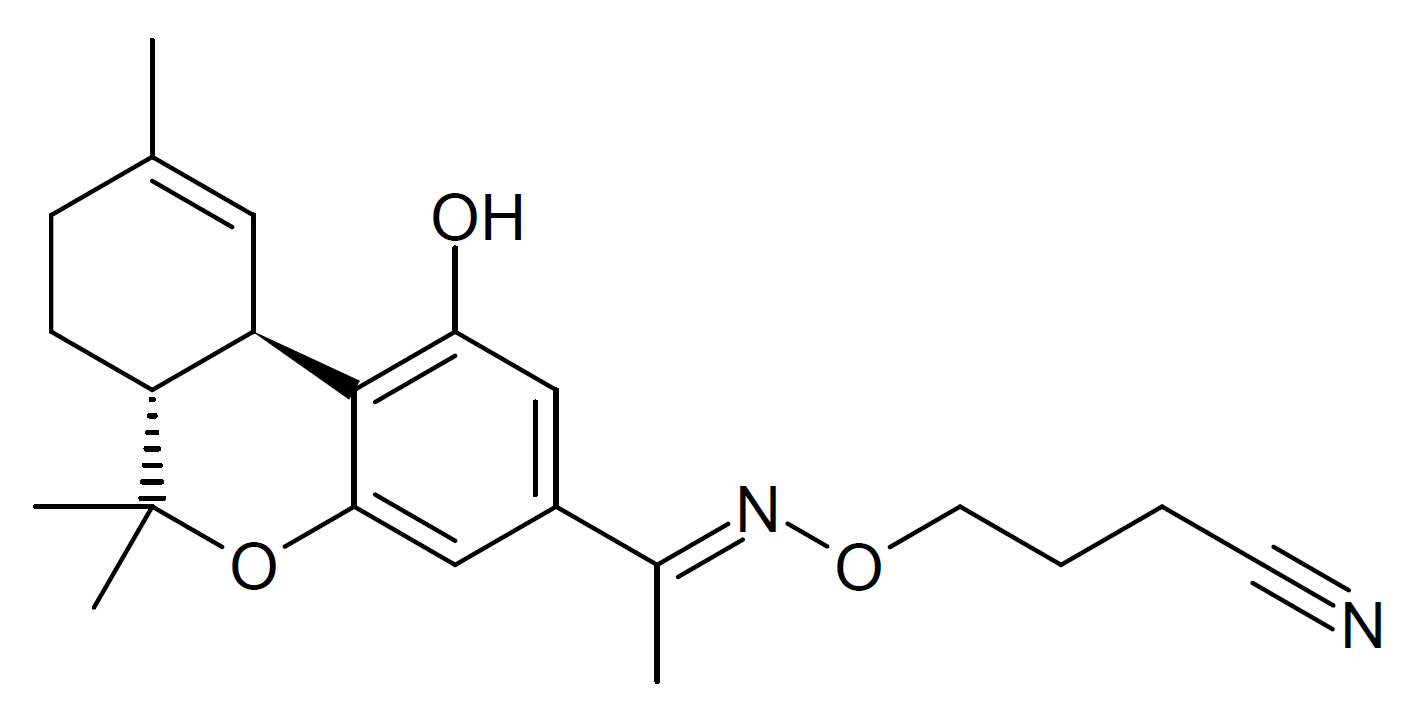
Δ^{9}-THC butanenitrile oxime

== See also ==
- 1'-Dimethyl-Δ9-THCH
- 2-Allyl-Δ8-THC-O-acetate
- 2-Cl-HHC
- Adamantyl-HHC
- AM-7438
- JWH-138
