= Rifaquizinone =

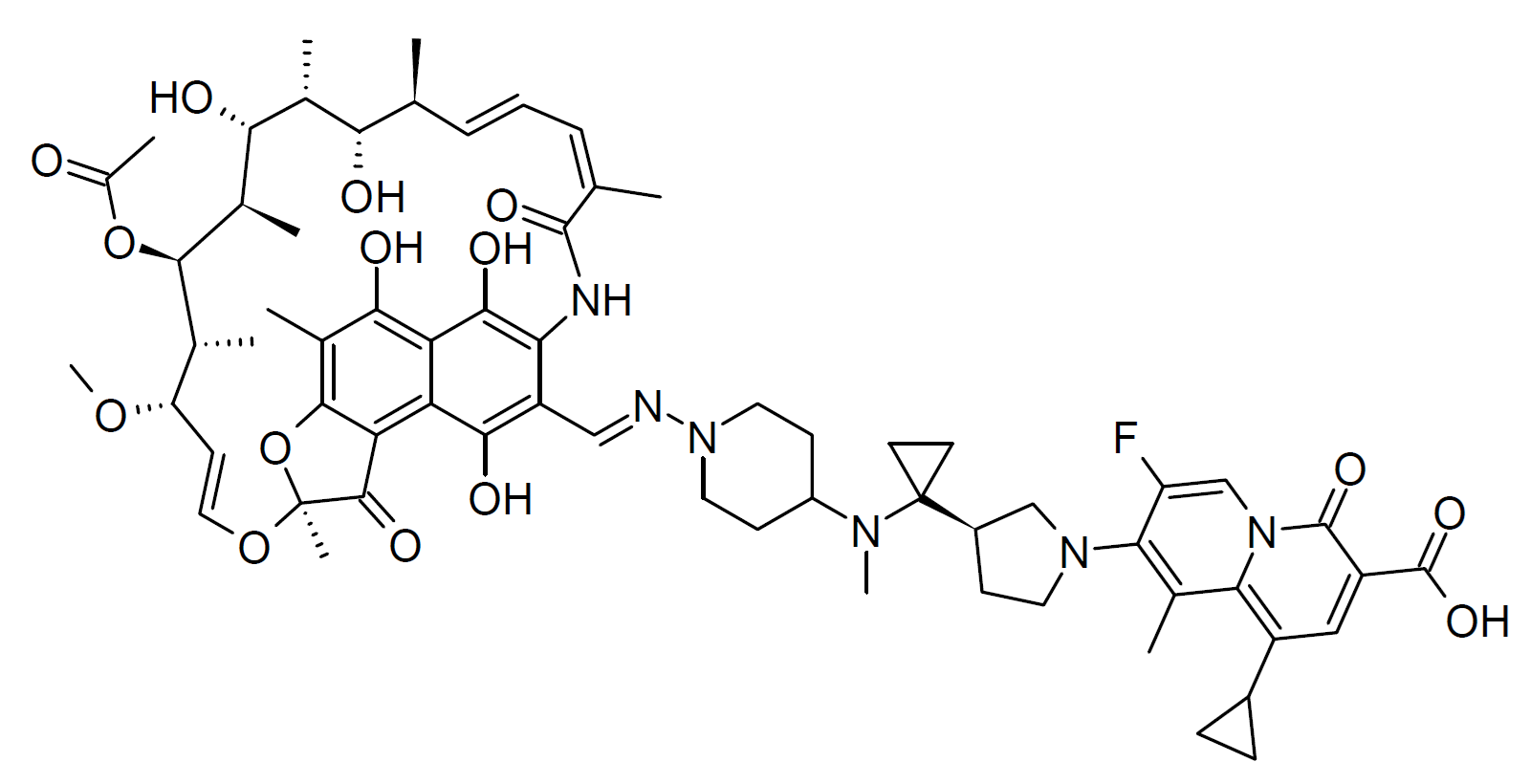

Clinical data
- Other names: RFQ, CBR-2092, TNP-2092
- Routes of administration: Oral, intravenous

Identifiers
- IUPAC name: 8-[(3R)-3-[1-[[1-[(E)-[(7S,9E,11S,12R,13S,14R,15R,16R,17S,18S,19E,21Z)-13-acetyloxy-2,15,17,27,29-pentahydroxy-11-methoxy-3,7,12,14,16,18,22-heptamethyl-6,23-dioxo-8,30-dioxa-24-azatetracyclo[23.3.1.1^{4,7}.0^{5,28}]triaconta-1(29),2,4,9,19,21,25,27-octaen-26-yl]methylideneamino]piperidin-4-yl]-methylamino]cyclopropyl]pyrrolidin-1-yl]-1-cyclopropyl-7-fluoro-9-methyl-4-oxoquinolizine-3-carboxylic acid
- CAS Number: 922717-97-3
- PubChem CID: 137253362
- IUPHAR/BPS: 11028
- DrugBank: DB16312
- ChemSpider: 26354547
- UNII: W2P7EF7O6O
- ChEMBL: ChEMBL1275685

Chemical and physical data
- Formula: C_{65}H_{81}FN_{6}O_{15}
- Molar mass: 1205.388 g·mol^{−1}
- 3D model (JSmol): Interactive image
- SMILES: C[C@H]1/C=C/C=C(\C(=O)NC2=C(C(=C3C(=C2O)C(=C(C4=C3C(=O)[C@](O4)(O/C=C/[C@@H]([C@H]([C@H]([C@@H]([C@@H]([C@@H]([C@H]1O)C)O)C)OC(=O)C)C)OC)C)C)O)O)/C=N/N5CCC(CC5)N(C)C6(CC6)[C@@H]7CCN(C7)C8=C(C9=C(C=C(C(=O)N9C=C8F)C(=O)O)C1CC1)C)/C
- InChI: InChI=1S/C65H81FN6O15/c1-31-13-12-14-32(2)61(80)68-50-44(56(77)47-48(57(50)78)55(76)37(7)59-49(47)60(79)64(9,87-59)85-26-20-46(84-11)33(3)58(86-38(8)73)36(6)54(75)35(5)53(31)74)28-67-71-24-18-41(19-25-71)69(10)65(21-22-65)40-17-23-70(29-40)52-34(4)51-42(39-15-16-39)27-43(63(82)83)62(81)72(51)30-45(52)66/h12-14,20,26-28,30-31,33,35-36,39-41,46,53-54,58,74-78H,15-19,21-25,29H2,1-11H3,(H,68,80)(H,82,83)/b13-12+,26-20+,32-14-,67-28+/t31-,33+,35+,36+,40+,46-,53-,54+,58+,64-/m0/s1; Key:OPZFMLLAJBIKAN-KYGXCNJYSA-N

Rifaquizinone (RFQ, CBR-2092, TNP-2092) is an experimental antibiotic medication developed in China for the treatment of bacterial infections such as drug-resistant strains of Staphylococcus aureus. It is an orally active prodrug which is also a codrug, being cleaved inside the body to two active components, with half of the molecule being a rifamycin derivative, and the other half a quinolone antibiotic. It is in clinical trials for joint infections following surgery and acute bacterial skin and skin structure infections.

== See also ==
- Cefilavancin
