= THC methylcarbonate =

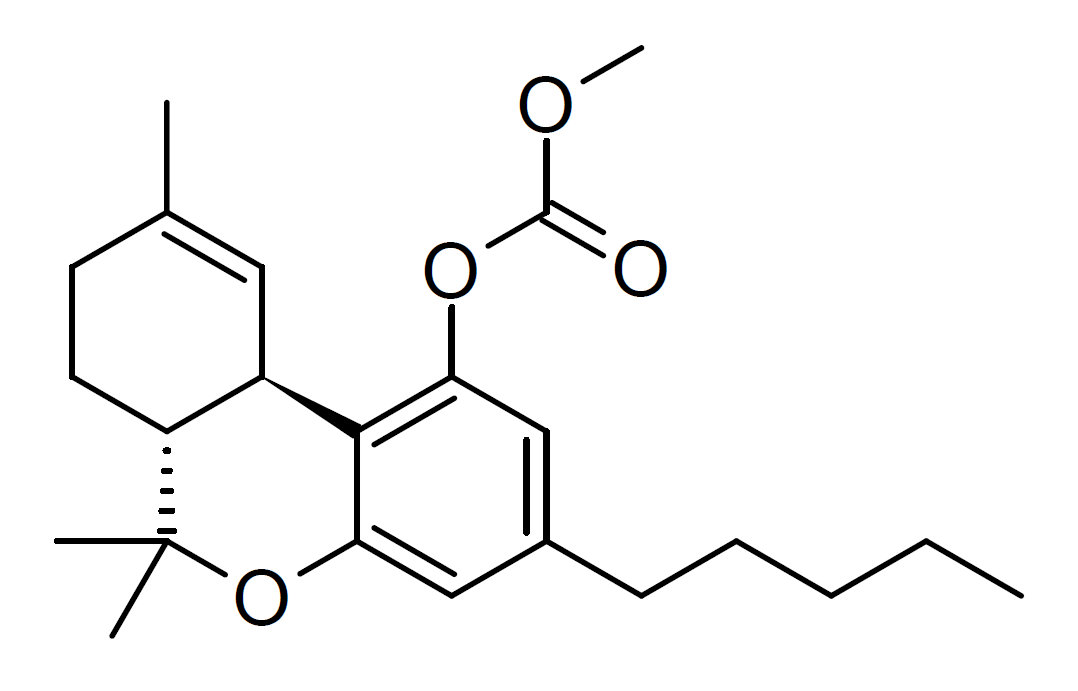

Identifiers
- IUPAC name: (6aR,10aR)-6,6,9-Trimethyl-3-pentyl-6a,7,8,10a-tetrahydro-6H-benzo[c]chromen-1-yl methylcarbonate

Chemical and physical data
- Formula: C_{23}H_{32}O_{4}
- Molar mass: 372.505 g·mol^{−1}
- 3D model (JSmol): Interactive image
- SMILES: COC(=O)Oc1cc(CCCCC)cc2OC(C)(C)[C@@H]3CCC(C)=C[C@H]3c21
- InChI: InChI=1S/C23H32O4/c1-6-7-8-9-16-13-19(26-22(24)25-5)21-17-12-15(2)10-11-18(17)23(3,4)27-20(21)14-16/h12-14,17-18H,6-11H2,1-5H3/t17-,18-/m1/s1; Key:OCIMDWOTFKKSJV-QZTJIDSGSA-N

THC methylcarbonate (Δ9-THC-methylcarbonate) is a semi-synthetic derivative of tetrahydrocannabinol, first reported as a designer drug in August 2024 when it was identified in a seized shipment by customs in Sweden. Coincidentally, it was the 1000th new psychoactive substance identified by the EU Early Warning System on New Psychoactive Substances since it was first established in 1997. It has subsequently been identified in Japan in 2025 along with various other novel cannabinoid compounds.

Related THC carbonate and carbamate prodrugs have been patented by Zynerba Pharmaceuticals.

== See also ==
- 2-Allyl-Δ8-THC-O-acetate
- Cod-THC
- THC-O-acetate
- THC hemisuccinate
- THC morpholinylbutyrate
