= Proglumetacin =

Non-steroidal anti-inflammatory drug

- Structure of proglumetacin

Structures of the two metabolites

Clinical data
- Trade names: Afloxan, Protaxon, Proxil
- Other names: 3-[4-[2-[2-[1-(4-chlorobenzoyl)-5-methoxy-2-methylindol-3-yl]acetyl]oxyethyl]piperazin-1-yl]propyl 4-(benzoylamino)-5-(dipropylamino)-5-oxopentanoate
- AHFS/Drugs.com: International Drug Names
- ATC code: M01AB14 (WHO)

Pharmacokinetic data
- Metabolism: Hepatic. Undergoes enterohepatic recirculation

Identifiers
- IUPAC name: 3-{4-[2-({[1-(4-chlorobenzoyl)-5-methoxy-2-methyl-1H-indol-3-yl]acetyl}oxy)ethyl]piperazin-1-yl}propyl N^{2}-benzoyl-N,N-dipropyl-α-glutaminate
- CAS Number: 57132-53-3 59209-40-4
- PubChem CID: 4921
- ChemSpider: 4752
- UNII: FV919079LU
- ChEBI: CHEBI:76263
- CompTox Dashboard (EPA): DTXSID0048842

Chemical and physical data
- Formula: C_{46}H_{58}ClN_{5}O_{8}
- Molar mass: 844.45 g·mol^{−1}
- 3D model (JSmol): Interactive image
- SMILES: CCCN(CCC)C(=O)C(CCC(=O)OCCCN1CCN(CCOC(=O)Cc2c(C)n(C(=O)c3ccc(Cl)cc3)c3ccc(OC)cc23)CC1)NC(=O)c1ccccc1
- InChI: InChI=1S/C46H58ClN5O8/c1-5-21-51(22-6-2)46(57)40(48-44(55)34-11-8-7-9-12-34)18-20-42(53)59-29-10-23-49-24-26-50(27-25-49)28-30-60-43(54)32-38-33(3)52(41-19-17-37(58-4)31-39(38)41)45(56)35-13-15-36(47)16-14-35/h7-9,11-17,19,31,40H,5-6,10,18,20-30,32H2,1-4H3,(H,48,55); Key:PTXGHCGBYMQQIG-UHFFFAOYSA-N

Proglumetacin (usually supplied as the maleate salt) is a nonsteroidal anti-inflammatory drug (NSAID). It is a codrug (that is, a mutual prodrug) of indometacin and proglumide. After oral intake, it is absorbed and metabolized to indometacin and proglumide. These two substances are then released into the system in a 1:1 molar ratio.

Indometacin contributes to the anti-inflammatory effect, while proglumide has antisecretory effects that helps prevent injury to the stomach lining.
