= Δ9-THCB-O-butanoate =

Clinical data
- Other names: ∆9-Tetrahydrocannabutol butanoate

Identifiers
- IUPAC name: (6aR,10aR)-6,6,9-trimethyl-1-butyryloxy-3-butyl-6a,7,8,9,10,10a-hexahydrobenzo[c]chromene

Chemical and physical data
- Formula: C_{24}H_{34}O_{3}
- Molar mass: 370.533 g·mol^{−1}
- 3D model (JSmol): Interactive image
- SMILES: C12[C@@H]3C=C(C)CC[C@H]3C(C)(C)OC1=CC(CCCC)=CC=2OC(=O)CCC
- InChI: InChI=1S/C24H34O3/c1-6-8-10-17-14-20(26-22(25)9-7-2)23-18-13-16(3)11-12-19(18)24(4,5)27-21(23)15-17/h13-15,18-19H,6-12H2,1-5H3/t18-,19-/m1/s1; Key:UFCDTZCZLGNDGE-RTBURBONSA-N

Δ^{9}-THCB-O-butanoate is an esterified derivative of THCB which has been sold as a designer drug, identified as a component of a cannabinoid e-cigarette liquid in Japan in 2025.

== See also ==
- 2-Cl-HHC
- THC-O-acetate
- THC hemisuccinate
- THC morpholinylbutyrate
