= THC hemisuccinate =

Synthetic derivative of tetrahydrocannabinol

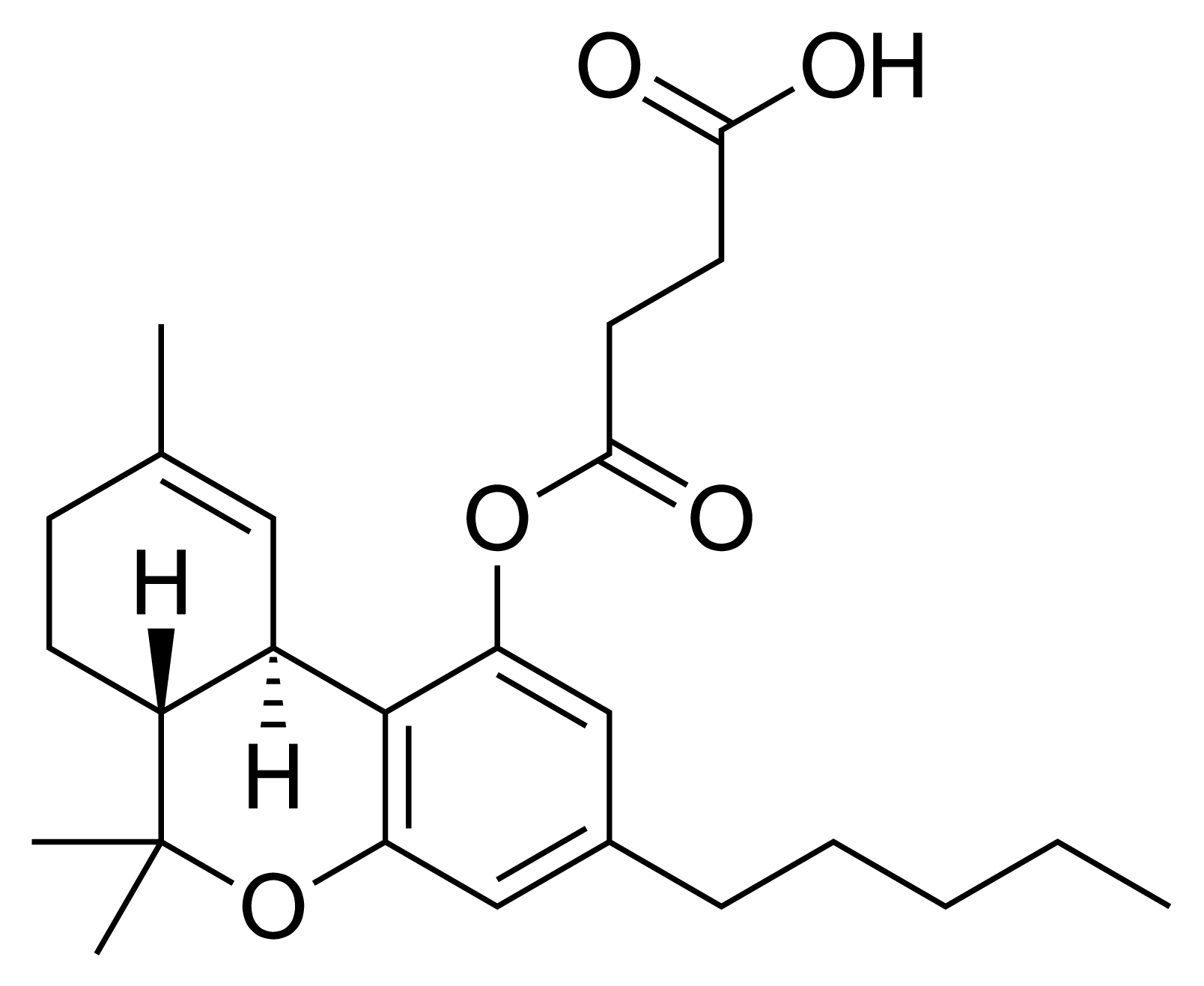

Identifiers
- IUPAC name: 4-[[(6aR,10aR)-6,6,9-trimethyl-3-pentyl-6a,7,8,10a-tetrahydrobenzo[c]chromen-1-yl]oxy]-4-oxobutanoic acid
- CAS Number: 52855-15-9
- PubChem CID: 162707
- ChemSpider: 142849
- CompTox Dashboard (EPA): DTXSID40200885

Chemical and physical data
- Formula: C_{25}H_{34}O_{5}
- Molar mass: 414.542 g·mol^{−1}
- 3D model (JSmol): Interactive image
- SMILES: CCCCCC1=CC2=C([C@@H]3C=C(CC[C@H]3C(O2)(C)C)C)C(=C1)OC(=O)CCC(=O)O
- InChI: InChI=1S/C25H34O5/c1-5-6-7-8-17-14-20(29-23(28)12-11-22(26)27)24-18-13-16(2)9-10-19(18)25(3,4)30-21(24)15-17/h13-15,18-19H,5-12H2,1-4H3,(H,26,27)/t18-,19-/m1/s1; Key:YVOODUUYDJKFDY-RTBURBONSA-N

THC hemisuccinate (Δ^{9}-THC-O-hemisuccinate, Dronabinol hemisuccinate) is a synthetic derivative of tetrahydrocannabinol, developed in the 1990s. It is a water-soluble prodrug ester which is converted into THC inside the body, and was developed to overcome the poor bioavailability of THC when taken by non-inhaled routes of administration. In medical applications it has mainly been formulated as rectal suppositories.

== See also ==
- Δ9-THCB-O-butanoate
- THC methylcarbonate
- THC-O-acetate
- THC-O-phosphate
- THC-VHS
- SP-111
- Oxazepam hemisuccinate
