= 2-Cl-HHC =

Identifiers
- IUPAC name: (6aR,10aR)-6,6,9-trimethyl-2-chloro-3-pentyl-6a,7,8,9,10,10a-hexahydrobenzo[c]chromen-1-ol

Chemical and physical data
- Formula: C_{21}H_{31}ClO_{2}
- Molar mass: 350.93 g·mol^{−1}
- 3D model (JSmol): Interactive image
- SMILES: CC1(C)Oc2cc(CCCCC)c(Cl)c(O)c2[C@@H]2CC(C)CC[C@H]21
- InChI: InChI=InChI=1S/C21H31ClO2/c1-5-6-7-8-14-12-17-18(20(23)19(14)22)15-11-13(2)9-10-16(15)21(3,4)24-17/h12-13,15-16,23H,5-11H2,1-4H3/t13?,15-,16-/m1/s1; Key:PHJMMAFCYCJUOX-GNHXQJIDSA-N

2-Cl-HHC (2-chloro-hexahydrocannabinol) is a chlorinated derivative of hexahydrocannabinol which has been sold as a designer drug, and is presumed to have cannabinoid activity. It was first identified as a component of a cannabinoid e-cigarette liquid in Japan in 2025 which was represented as being free from illicit cannabinoids such as THC. The active ingredient instead was identified as a mixture of 2-Cl-HHC and 4-Cl-HHC along with 2,4-dichloro-HHC and trace amounts of other chlorinated phytocannabinoid derivatives, as well as the ester Δ^{9}-THCB-O-butanoate. While chlorinated derivatives of THC such as 9-Cl-HHC had previously been identified, their biological activity has not been studied. 2-Cl-HHC has since been added to the controlled drugs list in Hungary.

4-Cl-HHC

9-Cl-HHC

== See also ==
- 1'-Dimethyl-Δ9-THCH
- 2-Allyl-Δ8-THC-O-acetate
- 4'-Fluorocannabidiol
- Adamantyl-HHC
- THC butanenitrile oxime
