= 2-Allyl-Δ8-THC-O-acetate =

Identifiers
- IUPAC name: (6aR,10aR)-6,6,9-trimethyl-1-acetoxy-2-(prop-2-en-1-yl)-3-pentyl-6a,7,10,10a-tetrahydrobenzo[c]chromene

Chemical and physical data
- Formula: C_{26}H_{36}O_{3}
- Molar mass: 396.571 g·mol^{−1}
- 3D model (JSmol): Interactive image
- SMILES: CC1(C)Oc2cc(CCCCC)c(CC=C)c(OC(C)=O)c2[C@@H]2CC(C)=CC[C@H]21
- InChI: InChI=InChI=1S/C26H36O3/c1-7-9-10-12-19-16-23-24(25(28-18(4)27)20(19)11-8-2)21-15-17(3)13-14-22(21)26(5,6)29-23/h8,13,16,21-22H,2,7,9-12,14-15H2,1,3-6H3/t21-,22-/m1/s1; Key:MMVPONAFVYVEOO-FGZHOGPDSA-N

2-Allyl-Δ^{8}-THC-O-acetate is a synthetic derivative of Δ^{8}-THC which has been sold as a designer drug, and is presumed to have cannabinoid activity. The parent compound 2-allyl-Δ^{8}-THC was first identified in Japan in 2025 as a component of cannabinoid e-cigarette liquid claimed to be free from illicit cannabinoids such as THC, and 2-allyl-Δ^{8}-THC-O-acetate was added to the controlled drugs list in Turkey in 2026.

2-Allyl-Δ^{8}-THC

== See also ==
- 1'-Dimethyl-Δ9-THCH
- 2-Cl-HHC
- Adamantyl-HHC
- THC butanenitrile oxime
- THC methylcarbonate
- THC-O-acetate
