= Benorilate =

Chemical compound

Clinical data
- Routes of administration: Oral
- ATC code: N02BA10 (WHO)

Identifiers
- IUPAC name: 4-acetamidophenyl 2-(acetyloxy)benzoate
- CAS Number: 5003-48-5
- PubChem CID: 21102
- ChemSpider: 19846
- UNII: W1QX9DV96G
- ChEMBL: ChEMBL162036
- CompTox Dashboard (EPA): DTXSID5022649
- ECHA InfoCard: 100.023.340

Chemical and physical data
- Formula: C_{17}H_{15}NO_{5}
- Molar mass: 313.309 g·mol^{−1}
- 3D model (JSmol): Interactive image
- SMILES: O=C(C)Oc2ccccc2C(=O)Oc1ccc(NC(C)=O)cc1
- InChI: InChI=1S/C17H15NO5/c1-11(19)18-13-7-9-14(10-8-13)23-17(21)15-5-3-4-6-16(15)22-12(2)20/h3-10H,1-2H3,(H,18,19); Key:FEJKLNWAOXSSNR-UHFFFAOYSA-N

Benorilate (INN), or benorylate, is an ester-linked codrug of aspirin with paracetamol. It is used as an anti-inflammatory and antipyretic medication. In the treatment of childhood fever, it has been shown to be inferior to paracetamol and aspirin taken separately. In addition, because it is converted to aspirin, benorylate is not recommended in children due to concerns about Reye syndrome.

It was originally introduced as a less-irritating ester of aspirin. Unlike aspirin and paracetamol, benorilate has no taste, though ethanol-based preparations may contain a slight smell of wintergreen from ethyl salicylate impurities.

== Synthesis ==
Acetylsalicoyl chloride (1) condenses with paracetamol (2) to give benorilate (3).

Synthesis of benorilate

Alkaline hydrolysis of the acetyl ester moiety of benorilate yields another pharmaceutical, acetaminosalol (phenetsal): the ester of salicylate and paracetamol.
