= THC-O-phosphate =

Derivative of tetrahydrocannabinol

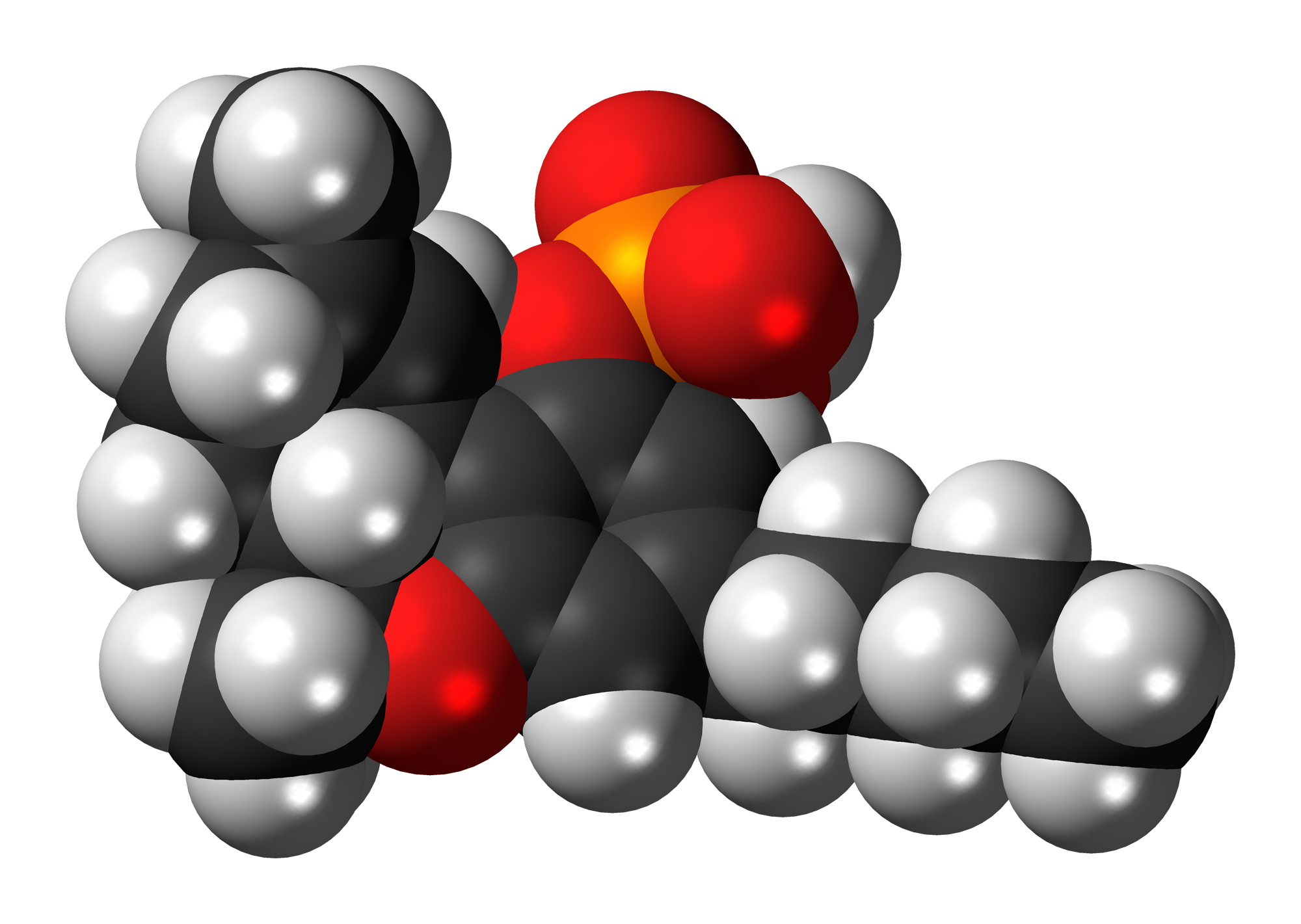

Identifiers
- IUPAC name: O-Phosphoryl-Δ8-tetrahydrocannabinol
- CAS Number: 67600-84-4
- PubChem CID: 9865413
- ChemSpider: 21396139
- CompTox Dashboard (EPA): DTXSID001027124

Chemical and physical data
- Formula: C_{21}H_{31}O_{5}P
- Molar mass: 394.448 g·mol^{−1}
- 3D model (JSmol): Interactive image
- SMILES: OP(O)(=O)Oc3cc(CCCCC)cc2OC(C)(C)C1C\C=C(\C)CC1c23
- InChI: InChI=1S/C21H31O5P/c1-5-6-7-8-15-12-18-20(19(13-15)26-27(22,23)24)16-11-14(2)9-10-17(16)21(3,4)25-18/h9,12-13,16-17H,5-8,10-11H2,1-4H3,(H2,22,23,24); Key:SVDBVZOOOSEJCD-UHFFFAOYSA-N

THC-O-phosphate is a water-soluble organophosphate ester derivative of tetrahydrocannabinol (THC), which functions as a metabolic prodrug for THC itself. It was invented in 1978 in an attempt to get around the poor water solubility of THC and make it easier to inject for the purposes of animal research into its pharmacology and mechanism of action. The main disadvantage of THC phosphate ester is the slow rate of hydrolysis of the ester link, resulting in delayed onset of action and lower potency than the parent drug. Pharmacologically, it is comparable to the action of psilocybin as a metabolic prodrug for psilocin.

THC phosphate ester is made by reacting THC with phosphoryl chloride using pyridine as a solvent, following by quenching with water to produce THC phosphate ester. In the original research the less active but more stable isomer Δ^{8}-THC was used, but the same reaction scheme could be used to make the phosphate ester of the more active isomer Δ^{9}-THC.

== See also ==
- THC-O-acetate
- THC hemisuccinate
- THC morpholinylbutyrate
