= Acylal =

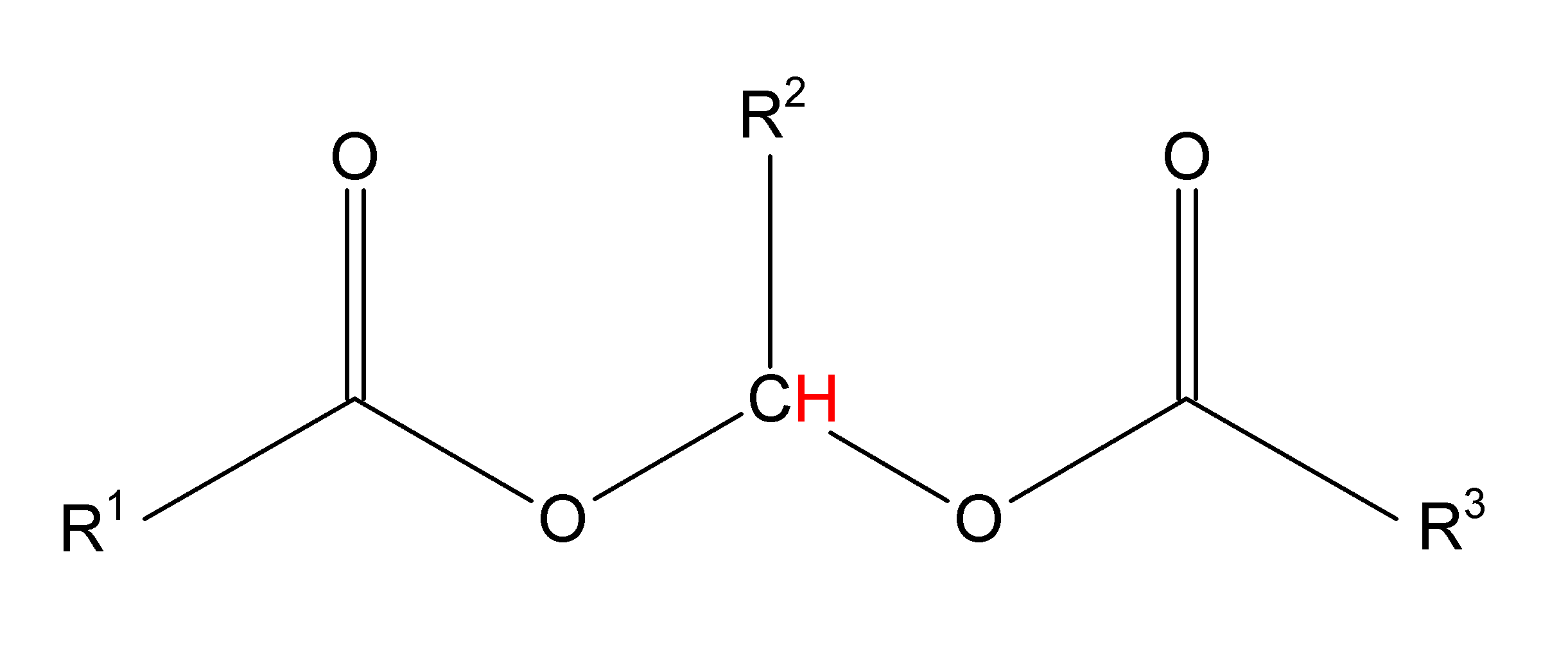
- General structure: RCH(OCOR')(OCOR'')

Names
- IUPAC name 1,1-Diacyloxyalkane (general)
- Other names: Acetaldehyde diacetate equivalent; Aldehyde diacyl acetal

Properties
Chemical formula	RCH(OCOR')(OCOR'')
Molar mass	Variable
- Except where otherwise noted, data are given for materials in their standard state (at 25 °C [77 °F], 100 kPa). Infobox references

Acylals in organic chemistry are a group of chemical compounds sharing a functional group with the general structure RCH(OOCR)_{2}. Acylals are obtained by reaction of carbonyls with acetic anhydride or other acid anhydrides and a suitable catalyst, for instance with sulfated zirconia at low temperatures when used as protective groups for aldehydes. High temperature exposure converts the acylal back to the aldehyde.
