= THC-O-acetate =

Acetate ester of tetrahydrocannabinol (THC)

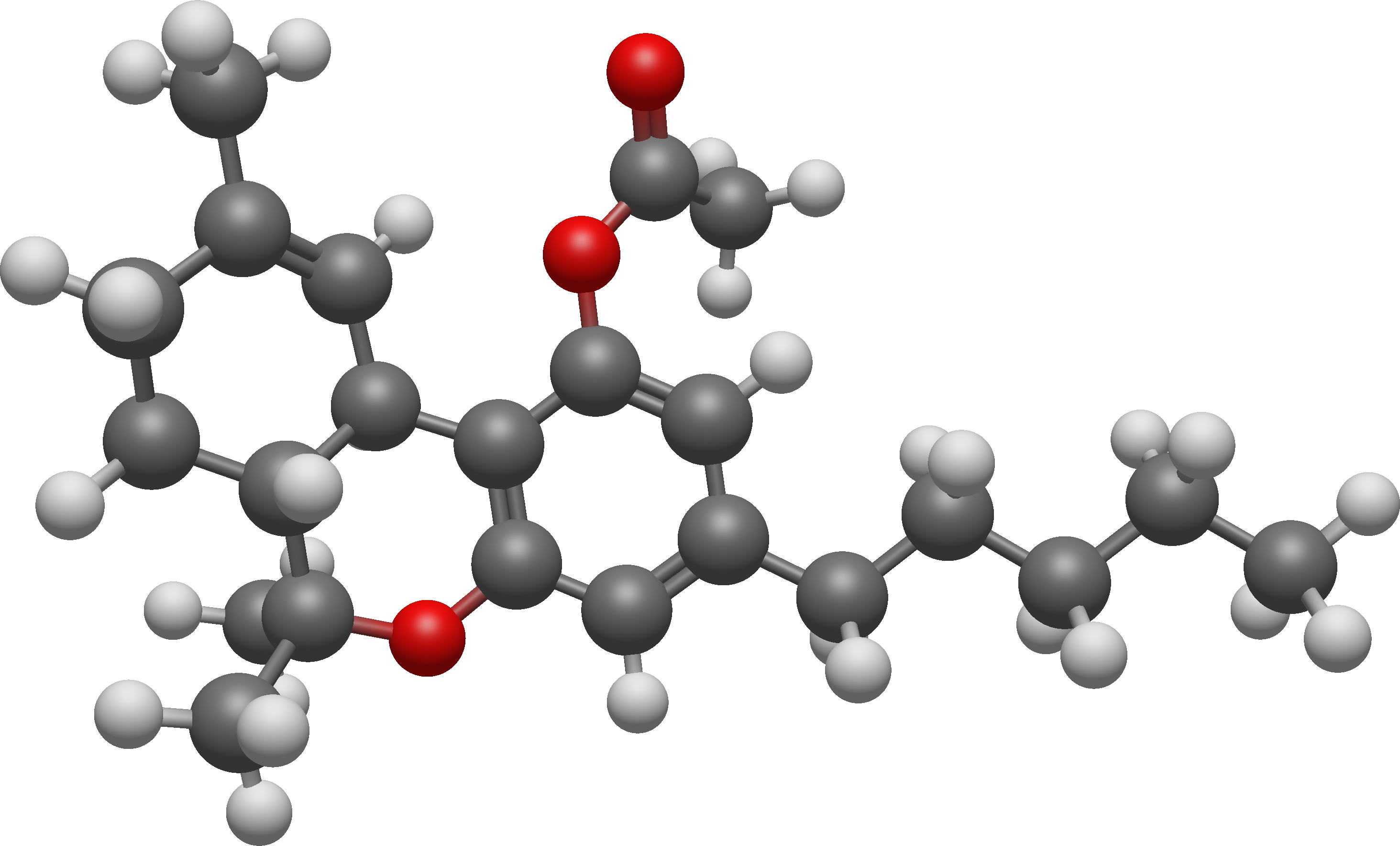

Legal status
- Legal status: UK: Class B; US: Disputed

Identifiers
- IUPAC name: (6aR,10aR)-6,6,9-Trimethyl-3-pentyl-6a,7,8,10a-tetrahydro-6H-benzo[c]chromen-1-yl acetate
- CAS Number: 23132-17-4
- PubChem CID: 198013
- ChemSpider: 171383
- UNII: VHV54M2AES
- CompTox Dashboard (EPA): DTXSID30177698

Chemical and physical data
- Formula: C_{23}H_{32}O_{3}
- Molar mass: 356.506 g·mol^{−1}
- 3D model (JSmol): Interactive image
- SMILES: O=C(Oc2cc(cc1OC([C@@H]3CC/C(=C\[C@H]3c12)C)(C)C)CCCCC)C
- InChI: InChI=1S/C23H32O3/c1-6-7-8-9-17-13-20(25-16(3)24)22-18-12-15(2)10-11-19(18)23(4,5)26-21(22)14-17/h12-14,18-19H,6-11H2,1-5H3/t18-,19-/m1/s1; Key:DEWSJDIJFWQLOA-RTBURBONSA-N

THC-O-acetate (THC acetate ester, O-acetyl-THC, THC-O, AcO-THC) is the acetate ester of THC. The term THC-O-acetate is commonly used for two different isomers of this substance, dependent on which isomer of THC it is synthesized from. The difference between Δ^{8}-THC and Δ^{9}-THC is the location of the double bond within the cyclohexene ring system. In naming the esters of THC, the "-O-" is superfluous.

== Physical data, chemistry, and properties ==
O-acetyl-Δ^{8}-THC , CAS# 23050-54-6

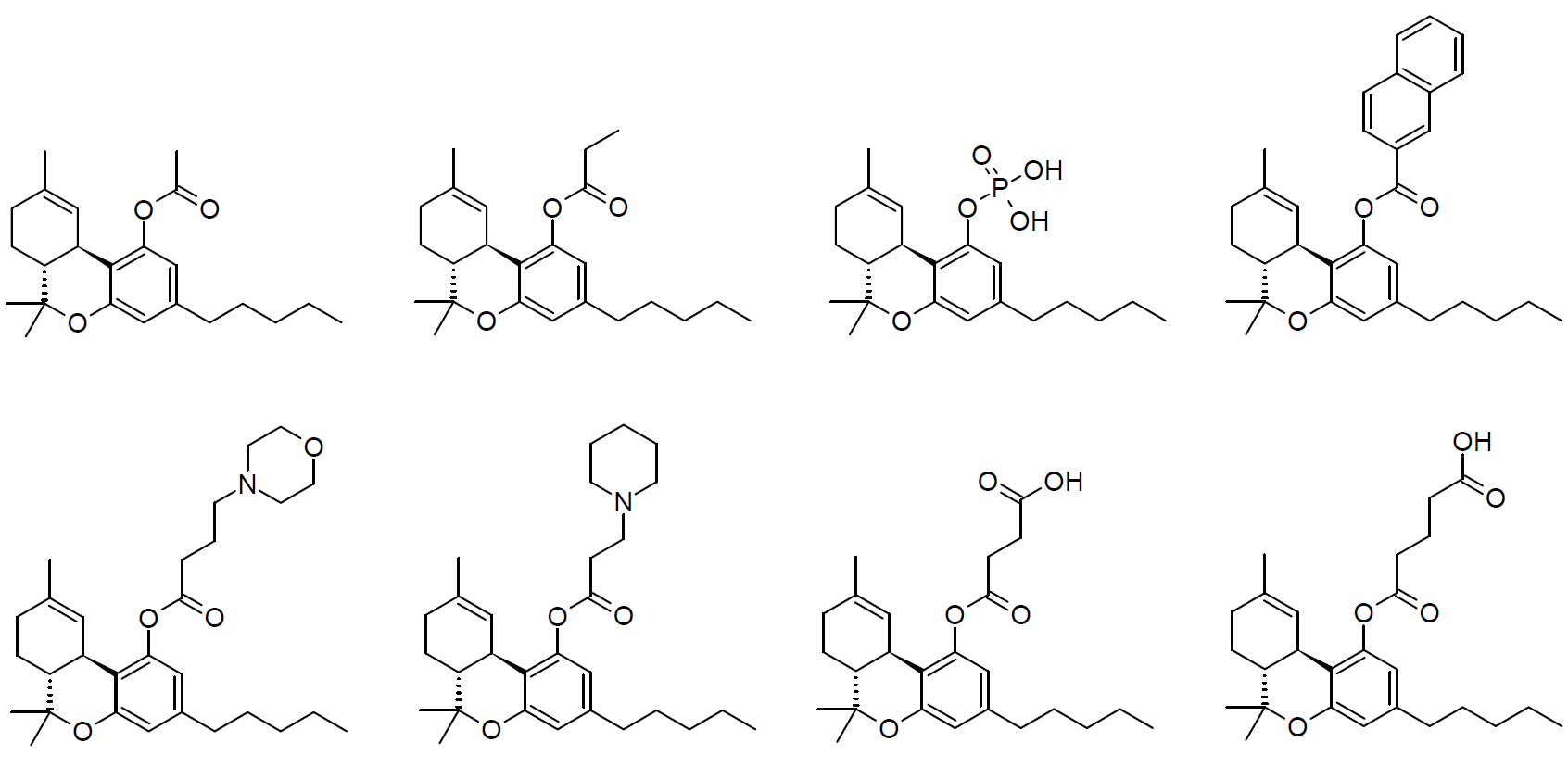
Esters of Δ^{9}-THC: Top (from left); THC acetate, THC propionate, THC phosphate, THC-NE, Bottom; THC morpholinylbutyrate, THC piperidinylpropionate, THC hemisuccinate, THC hemiglutarate

THC acetate ester (THC-O or THCOA) can be synthesized from THC, or from THCA. The acetylation of THC does not change the properties of the compound to the same extent as with other acetate esters, as the parent compound (THC) is already highly lipophilic, but potency is nonetheless increased to some extent. While the acetate ester of Δ^{9}-THC is the best studied, the acetate esters of other isomers, especially Δ^{8}-THC but also Δ^{10}-THC are also known, as are other esters such as THC-O-propionate, THC-O-phosphate, THC hemisuccinate, THC hemiglutarate, THC morpholinylbutyrate, THC piperidinylpropionate, THC naphthoyl ester (THC-NE), and THC-VHS, as well as the hydrogenated derivative HHC-O-acetate and the ring-expanded Abeo-HHC acetate, as well as related compounds such as THC methylcarbonate.

== Pharmacology ==
It is a metabolic pro-drug, with its subjective effects being felt around 30 minutes after ingestion.

=== Psychedelic claims ===
In a 2023 study, anecdotal claims surrounding THC-O-acetate's supposed ability to initiate psychedelic experiences were shown to not be significant. Answers using the Mystical Experience Questionnaire (MEQ) were under the threshold of a true experience, and those who had used classical psychedelics such as LSD or psilocybin consistently scored lower on the MEQ. When asked directly, 79% of the participants said it was either "not at all" or "a little" like a psychedelic experience.

== History ==
This substance was investigated as a possible non-lethal incapacitating agent as part of the Edgewood Arsenal experiments at some point between 1949 and 1975. It was noted to have about twice the capacity to produce ataxia (lack of voluntary coordination of muscle movements) as did THC when administered to dogs.

Author D. Gold provided synthesis instructions for this compound (calling it "THC acetate") in his 1974 book Cannabis Alchemy: Art of Modern Hashmaking, in which it is described as follows;

"The effect of the acetate is more spiritual and psychedelic than that of the ordinary product. The most unique property of this material is that there is a delay of about thirty minutes before its effects are felt."

The U.S. DEA first encountered THC-O-acetate as an apparent controlled substance analogue of THC in 1978. It was made in an analogous manner to how aspirin (acetylsalicylic acid) was first made from willow bark extract (which is mostly salicylic acid) in the 1800s. The incident was described by Donald A. Cooper of the DEA thus:

Given the world wide ready availability of marijuana, it is somewhat difficult to produce a viable argument for making [controlled substance analogs (CsA's)] of cannabinoids. However, ten years ago (1978) an attempt to produce CsA's from cannabis extracts was encountered in the Jacksonville, Florida area. In this case a concentrated extract of cannabis had been obtained by a soxhlet extraction. The extract had been acetylated with acetic anhydride, and in the final step, the excess acetic anhydride removed by distillation (reference is unretrievable due to its appearance in an underground periodical). The product contained neither quantities of nonderivatized cannabinoid nor any identifiable plant fragments. Since this single instance, no acetylated cannabinoid samples have been reported by a DEA laboratory. Therefore, this instance is assumed to represent an isolated occurrence and as such, will serve to terminate our discussion of cannabinoid CsA's.

A similar case reported in June 1995 in the United Kingdom.The description of that case appears to indicate the convicted manufacturer was using D. Gold's book Cannabis Alchemy as a guide. THC acetate was also reported to have been found by New Zealand police in 1995, again made by acetylation of purified cannabis extracts with acetic anhydride.

With passage of the 2018 United States farm bill (which eased legal restrictions on the cultivation of industrial hemp), ∆8-THC-O-acetate based vaporizers and edibles have become increasingly available in the United States and are now commonly sold at convenience stores and gas stations.

== Toxicity ==
In 2022, researchers at Portland State University used an e-nail to vaporize CBD-acetate, CBN-acetate, and THC-O-acetate (referred to simply as "THC acetate") to screen for the presence of ketene formation when vaporizing. They reported that just like Vitamin E acetate, all three of these cannabinoid acetates produced ketene gas when heated. For this reason, the inhalation of THC-O-acetate based products could be hazardous to health.

== Legal status ==
=== United Kingdom ===
THC-O-acetate is a Class B drug in the United Kingdom.

=== United States ===
The legal status of THC-O is in dispute within the United States. Since 2023, the Drug Enforcement Administration has held the position that it is a controlled substance because "delta-9-THCO and delta-8-THCO do not occur naturally in the cannabis plant and can only be obtained synthetically". In September 2024, being the first court case specifically addressing this issue, the United States Court of Appeals for the Fourth Circuit rejected the foregoing DEA position and "set a legal hemp standard" by holding that THC-O is legal. The issue of THC-O legality has not been addressed by other circuits or by the Supreme Court and there remains a "hazy legal landscape" for hemp derived psychotropic products.

=== Germany ===
On 27 June 2024, following the Ban of HHC, THC-O-Acetate was added to both the annex of New Psychoactive Substances Act (NpSG) and the Narcotic Drugs Act (BtMG) since it was not a naturally occurring cannabinoid.

Manufacture, sale and possession of the cannabinoid has since been fully outlawed.

== See also ==
- Acetylation
- Abeo-HHC acetate
- Cannabidiol diacetate
- Cod-THC
- Nabitan
- O-1057
- O-2694
- HHCP-O-acetate
- THCP-O-acetate
- THC butanenitrile oxime
- Edgewood Arsenal human experiments
