= AM-251 =

AM-251 may refer to:

- USS Inflict (AM-251)
- AM-251 (drug), a CB1 cannabinoid receptor antagonist
