= O-1269 =

Chemical compound

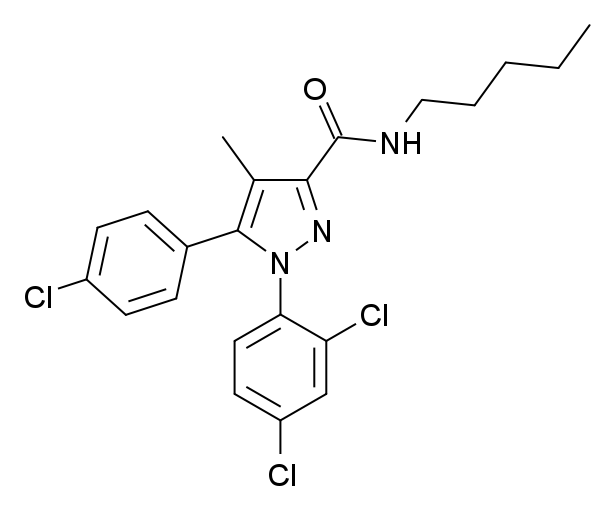

Identifiers
- IUPAC name: 5-(4-Chlorophenyl)-1-(2,4-dichlorophenyl)-4-methyl-N-pentylpyrazole-3-carboxamide
- CAS Number: 336615-64-6
- PubChem CID: 9868408
- ChemSpider: 8044099
- UNII: ZK4MED9M94
- CompTox Dashboard (EPA): DTXSID70432096

Chemical and physical data
- Formula: C_{22}H_{22}Cl_{3}N_{3}O
- Molar mass: 450.79 g·mol^{−1}
- 3D model (JSmol): Interactive image
- SMILES: CCCCCNC(=O)c2nn(c(c2C)-c(cc3)ccc3Cl)-c1ccc(Cl)cc1Cl
- InChI: InChI=1S/C22H22Cl3N3O/c1-3-4-5-12-26-22(29)20-14(2)21(15-6-8-16(23)9-7-15)28(27-20)19-11-10-17(24)13-18(19)25/h6-11,13H,3-5,12H2,1-2H3,(H,26,29); Key:JDBOTXIRNSWBCG-UHFFFAOYSA-N

O-1269 is a drug that is a diarylpyrazole derivative, related to potent cannabinoid antagonist drugs such as rimonabant and surinabant. However O-1269 and several related drugs were unexpectedly found to act as full or partial agonists at the cannabinoid receptors rather than antagonists, and so produce the usual effects expected of cannabinoid agonists in animal tests, such as sedation and analgesic effects. The N-heptyl homolog O-1270 and the N-propyl homolog O-1399 also act as cannabinoid agonists with similar potency in vivo, despite weaker binding affinity at cannabinoid receptors compared to the pentyl homolog O-1269. Agonist-like and atypical cannabinoid activity has also been observed with a number of related compounds.
