= Ibipinabant =

Chemical compound

Clinical data
- ATC code: none

Identifiers
- IUPAC name: 4S-(−)-3-(4-chlorophenyl)-N-methyl-N'-[(4-chlorophenyl)-sulfonyl]-4-phenyl-4,5-dihydro-1H-pyrazole-1-carboxamidine
- CAS Number: 464213-10-3
- PubChem CID: 9826744
- ChemSpider: 24765166
- UNII: O5CSC6WH1T
- KEGG: D09349
- ChEMBL: ChEMBL158784
- CompTox Dashboard (EPA): DTXSID70963572
- ECHA InfoCard: 100.158.931

Chemical and physical data
- Formula: C_{24}H_{22}Cl_{2}N_{4}O_{2}S
- Molar mass: 501.43 g·mol^{−1}
- 3D model (JSmol): Interactive image
- SMILES: c2cc(Cl)ccc2C1=NN(C(NC)=NCS(=O)(=O)c3ccc(Cl)cc3)CC1c4ccccc4
- InChI: InChI=1S/C24H22Cl2N4O2S/c1-27-24(28-16-33(31,32)21-13-11-20(26)12-14-21)30-15-22(17-5-3-2-4-6-17)23(29-30)18-7-9-19(25)10-8-18/h2-14,22H,15-16H2,1H3,(H,27,28)/t22-/m1/s1; Key:BSFKAVCGRDMWTK-JOCHJYFZSA-N

Ibipinabant (SLV319, BMS-646,256) was designed by Jos Lange at Solvay Pharmaceuticals in 2000. Nowadays, it is an in vivo active pharmacological tool used in scientific research which acts as a potent and highly selective CB_{1} antagonist. It has potent anorectic effects in animals, and was researched for the treatment of obesity, although CB_{1} antagonists as a class have now fallen out of favour as potential anorectics following the problems seen with rimonabant, and so ibipinabant is now only used for laboratory research, especially structure-activity relationship studies into novel CB_{1} antagonists. SLV330, which is a structural analogue of Ibipinabant, was reported active in animal models related to the regulation of memory, cognition, as well as in addictive behavior. An atom-efficient synthesis of ibipinabant has been reported.

== See also ==
- Cannabinoid receptor antagonist
- List of investigational antipsychotics
