= JD5037 =

Chemical compound

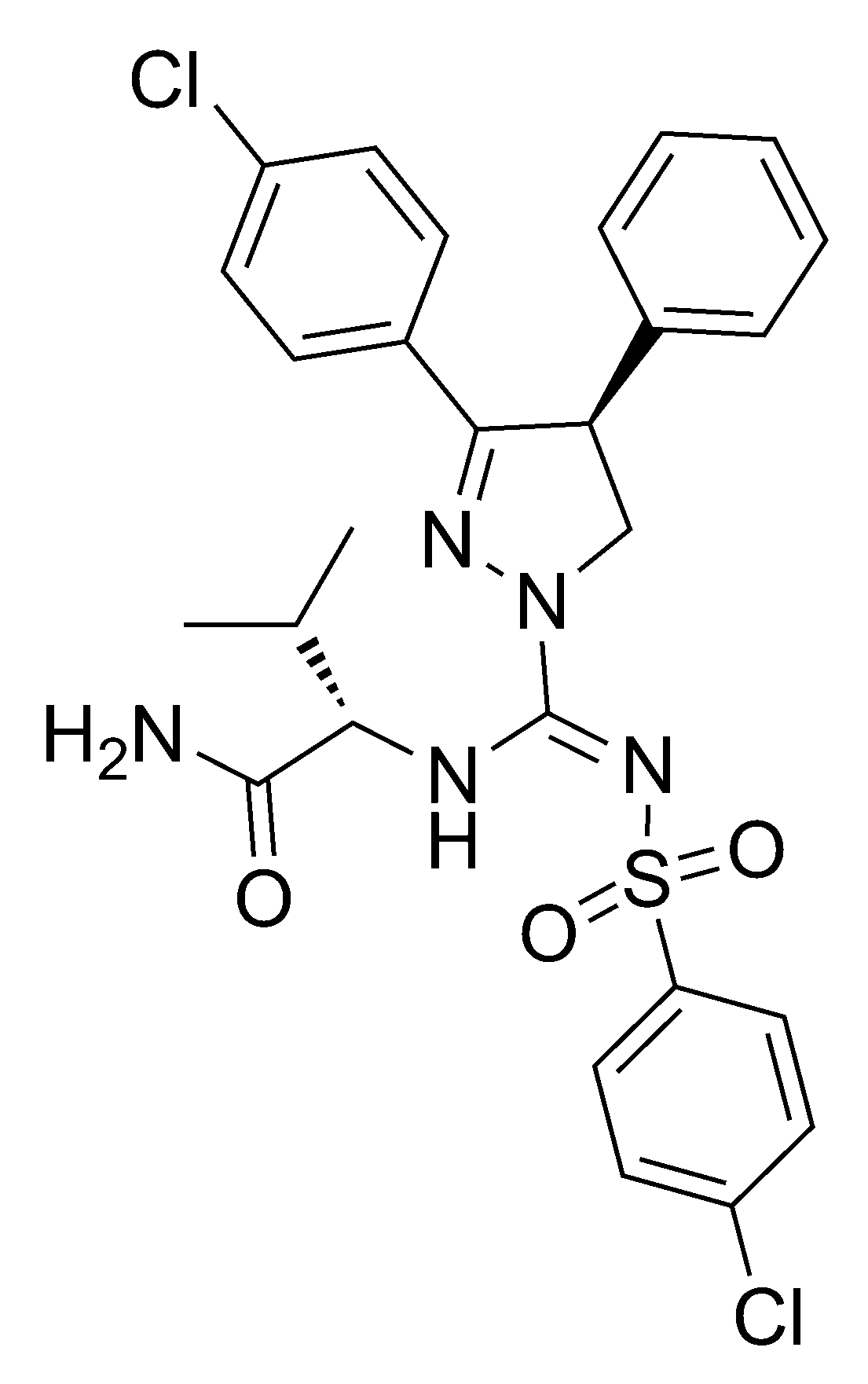

Identifiers
- IUPAC name: (S)-2-((S,E)-3-(4-chlorophenyl)-N'-((4-chlorophenyl)sulfonyl)-4-phenyl-4,5-dihydro-1H-pyrazole-1-carboximidamido)-3-methylbutanamide
- CAS Number: 1392116-14-1
- PubChem CID: 66553204
- IUPHAR/BPS: 10690
- ChemSpider: 28663876
- UNII: ENZ75DG2Z6
- ChEMBL: ChEMBL2153670

Chemical and physical data
- Formula: C_{27}H_{27}Cl_{2}N_{5}O_{3}S
- Molar mass: 572.51 g·mol^{−1}
- 3D model (JSmol): Interactive image
- SMILES: CC(C)[C@@H](C(=O)N)N/C(=N\S(=O)(=O)C1=CC=C(C=C1)Cl)/N2C[C@@H](C(=N2)C3=CC=C(C=C3)Cl)C4=CC=CC=C4
- InChI: InChI=1S/C27H27Cl2N5O3S/c1-17(2)24(26(30)35)31-27(33-38(36,37)22-14-12-21(29)13-15-22)34-16-23(18-6-4-3-5-7-18)25(32-34)19-8-10-20(28)11-9-19/h3-15,17,23-24H,16H2,1-2H3,(H2,30,35)(H,31,33)/t23-,24+/m1/s1; Key:GTCSIQFTNPTSLO-RPWUZVMVSA-N

JD5037 is an antiobesity drug candidate which acts as a peripherally-restricted cannabinoid inverse agonist at CB_{1} receptors. It is very selective for the CB_{1} subtype, with a Ki of 0.35nM, >700-fold higher affinity than it has for CB_{2} receptors.

In animal studies, JD5037 does not readily cross the blood brain barrier and thus is not expected to produce the psychiatric side effects in humans which led to the withdrawal of rimonabant from the market. Its antiobesity effects are believed to be mediated by blockade of peripheral CB_{1} receptors, resulting in decreased leptin expression and secretion and increased leptin clearance by the kidneys. In obese mice given the drug, the resulting resensitization to leptin levels produced decreased food intake, weight loss, and normalized responses to glucose and insulin.

In a study of mice, JD5037 reduced the consumption of alcohol.

JD5037 is covered in the following US Patents issued to Jenrin Discovery: 8,088,809 (1/3/12) ), 7,666,889 (2/23/10), 7,482,470 (1/27/09). The synthesis of JD-5037 and related analogs along with structure activity relationships has been reported.

A review on the approaches and compound types being pursued as peripherally restricted CB1 receptor blockers, including JD5037, has been published.

== Preclinical Toxicity ==
A preclinical toxicity study of JD5037 in rats and beagle dogs reported NOAELs in rats (150 mg/kg) and dogs (20 mg/kg in males and 75 mg/kg in females). JD5037 showed non-linear kinetics where high dose levels showed plasma saturation with lower plasma drug concentrations. The plasma concentration (area under the curve, AUC) in dogs that were given free access to food was almost 4.5 times greater compared to the dogs that were fasted prior to dose administration. This indicates that the presence of food in the gastrointestinal tract may increase the absorption of JD5037.
