= Otenabant =

Chemical compound

Clinical data
- ATC code: none

Identifiers
- IUPAC name: 1-[8-(2-chlorophenyl)-9-(4-chlorophenyl)-9H-purin-6-yl]-4-(ethylamino)piperidine-4- carboxamide
- CAS Number: 686344-29-6
- PubChem CID: 10052040
- ChemSpider: 8227602
- UNII: J8211Y53EF
- KEGG: D09362
- ChEMBL: ChEMBL562668
- CompTox Dashboard (EPA): DTXSID20988316

Chemical and physical data
- Formula: C_{25}H_{25}Cl_{2}N_{7}O
- Molar mass: 510.42 g·mol^{−1}
- 3D model (JSmol): Interactive image
- SMILES: CCNC1(CCN(CC1)C2=NC=NC3=C2N=C(N3C4=CC=C(C=C4)Cl)C5=CC=CC=C5Cl)C(=O)N
- InChI: InChI=1S/C25H25Cl2N7O/c1-2-31-25(24(28)35)11-13-33(14-12-25)22-20-23(30-15-29-22)34(17-9-7-16(26)8-10-17)21(32-20)18-5-3-4-6-19(18)27/h3-10,15,31H,2,11-14H2,1H3,(H2,28,35); Key:UNAZAADNBYXMIV-UHFFFAOYSA-N

Otenabant (CP-945,598) is a drug that acts as a potent and highly selective CB_{1} antagonist. It was developed by Pfizer for the treatment of obesity, but development for this application has been discontinued following the problems seen during clinical use of the similar drug rimonabant.

== See also ==
- Cannabinoid receptor antagonist
