= NESS-0327 =

Chemical compound

Identifiers
- CAS Number: 494844-07-4
- PubChem CID: 10435654
- ChemSpider: 8611079
- UNII: X1BQI2J97I
- CompTox Dashboard (EPA): DTXSID00439851

Chemical and physical data
- Formula: C_{24}H_{23}Cl_{3}N_{4}O
- Molar mass: 489.83 g·mol^{−1}
- 3D model (JSmol): Interactive image
- SMILES: Clc3cc(Cl)ccc3-n4c2-c1ccc(Cl)cc1CCCc2c(n4)C(=O)NN5CCCCC5
- InChI: InChI=1S/C24H23Cl3N4O/c25-16-7-9-18-15(13-16)5-4-6-19-22(24(32)29-30-11-2-1-3-12-30)28-31(23(18)19)21-10-8-17(26)14-20(21)27/h7-10,13-14H,1-6,11-12H2,(H,29,32); Key:NCXBPZJQQSNIRA-UHFFFAOYSA-N

NESS-0327 is a drug used in scientific research which acts as an extremely potent and selective antagonist of the cannabinoid receptor CB_{1}. It is much more potent an antagonist, and more selective for the CB_{1} receptor over CB_{2}, than the more commonly used ligand rimonabant, with a K_{i} at CB_{1} of 350fM (i.e. 0.00035nM) and a selectivity of over 60,000x for CB_{1} over CB_{2}. Independently, two other groups have described only modest nanomolar CB_{1} affinity for this compound (125nM and 18.4nM). Also unlike rimonabant, NESS-0327 does not appear to act as an inverse agonist at higher doses, instead being a purely neutral antagonist which blocks the CB_{1} receptor but does not produce any physiological effect of its own.

== See also ==
- Discovery and development of Cannabinoid Receptor 1 Antagonists
- NESS-040C5
