= Drinabant =

Chemical compound

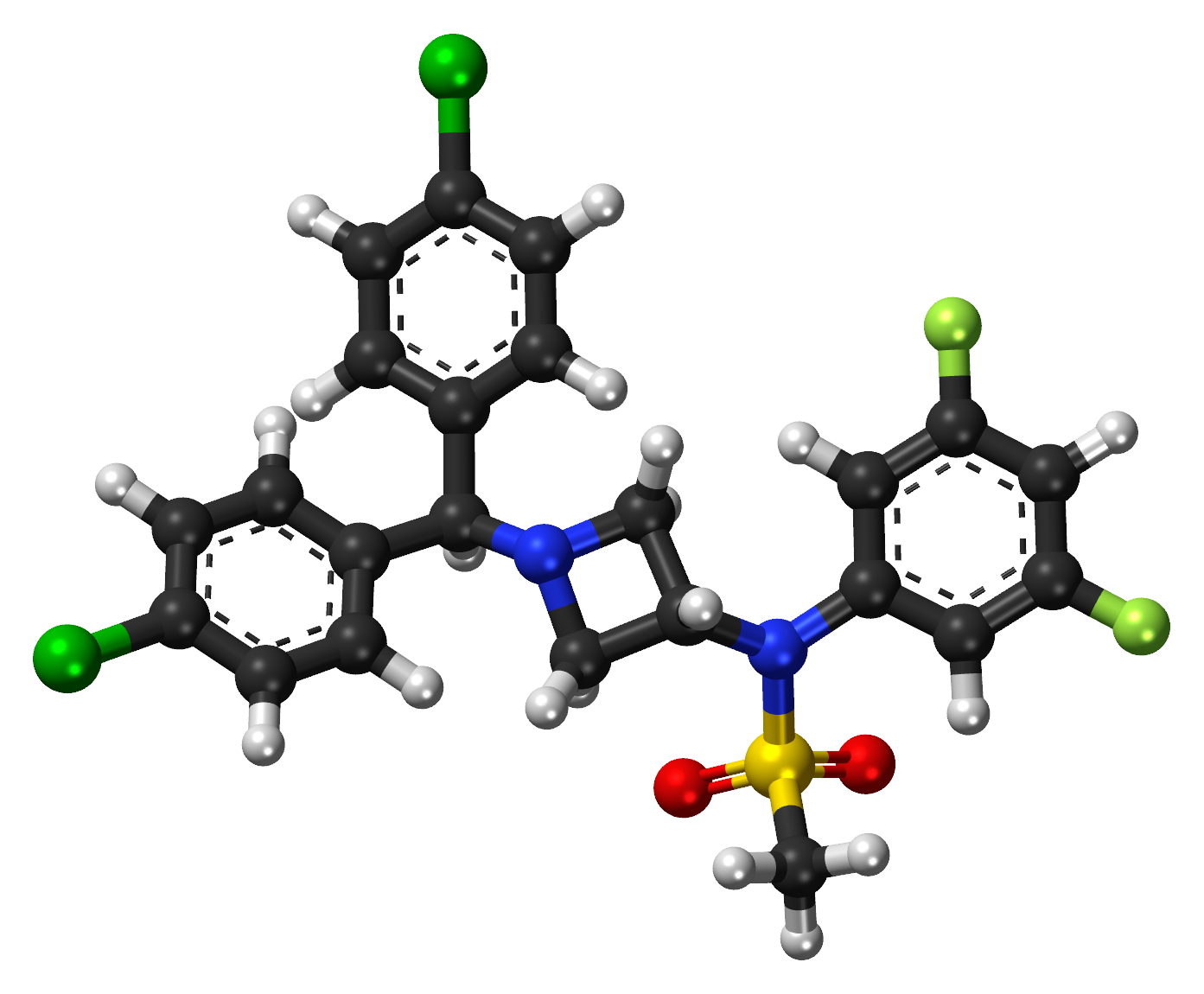

Clinical data
- ATC code: None

Identifiers
- IUPAC name: (±)-N-{1-[Bis(4-chlorophenyl)methyl]-3-azetidinyl}-N-(3,5-difluorophenyl)methanesulfonamide
- CAS Number: 358970-97-5
- PubChem CID: 10278470
- ChemSpider: 8453947
- UNII: 61S98RLL5I
- CompTox Dashboard (EPA): DTXSID50189455

Chemical and physical data
- Formula: C_{23}H_{20}Cl_{2}F_{2}N_{2}O_{2}S
- Molar mass: 497.38 g·mol^{−1}
- 3D model (JSmol): Interactive image
- SMILES: Fc1cc(cc(F)c1)N(C4CN(C(c2ccc(Cl)cc2)c3ccc(Cl)cc3)C4)S(=O)(=O)C
- InChI: InChI=1S/C23H20Cl2F2N2O2S/c1-32(30,31)29(21-11-19(26)10-20(27)12-21)22-13-28(14-22)23(15-2-6-17(24)7-3-15)16-4-8-18(25)9-5-16/h2-12,22-23H,13-14H2,1H3; Key:IQQBRKLVEALROM-UHFFFAOYSA-N

Drinabant (INN; AVE-1625) is a drug that acts as a selective CB_{1} receptor antagonist, which was under investigation varyingly by Sanofi-Aventis as a treatment for obesity, schizophrenia, Alzheimer's disease, Parkinson's disease, and nicotine dependence. Though initially studied as a potential treatment for a variety of different medical conditions, Sanofi-Aventis eventually narrowed down the therapeutic indications of the compound to just appetite suppression. Drinabant reached phase IIb clinical trials for this purpose in the treatment of obesity but was shortly thereafter discontinued, likely due to the observation of severe psychiatric side effects including anxiety, depression, and thoughts of suicide in patients treated with the now-withdrawn CB1R antagonist rimonabant.

In late 2018, the drug was licensed by Opiant Pharmaceuticals, which intends to develop it for the treatment of acute cannabinoid overdose (ACO) as an injectable for administration in an emergency department setting. Opiant claims that ACO is most frequently linked to the ingestion of cannabis edibles and/or synthetic cannabinoids that are more potent and less expensive than natural cannabis extracts such as hash oil. Edibles, sold as capsules, brownies, cookies, chocolate bars and gumdrops, may pose particular risks for children, who may consume these by accident. The existence of ACO is heavily debated. In fact, most people who die from cannabinoid ingestion have had chronic life-long heart problems or are involved in accidents from driving while intoxicated.

Rimonabant was another cannabinoid receptor antagonist developed for prescription drug use that triggered severe psychiatric side effects and was withdrawn from the market.

== See also ==
- Cannabinoid receptor antagonist
- List of investigational antipsychotics
- Rimonabant
