= SR-144,528 =

Chemical compound

Clinical data
- ATC code: none

Identifiers
- IUPAC name: 5-(4-Chloro-3-methylphenyl)-1-[(4-methylphenyl)methyl]-N-[(1S,2S,4R)-1,3,3-trimethylbicyclo[2.2.1]heptan-2-yl]-1H-pyrazole-3-carboxamide
- CAS Number: 192703-06-3
- PubChem CID: 3081355
- IUPHAR/BPS: 751
- ChemSpider: 2338975
- ChEBI: CHEBI:146245
- ChEMBL: ChEMBL381791
- CompTox Dashboard (EPA): DTXSID50940947

Chemical and physical data
- Formula: C_{29}H_{34}ClN_{3}O
- Molar mass: 476.06 g·mol^{−1}
- 3D model (JSmol): Interactive image
- SMILES: CC1=CC=C(C=C1)CN2C(=CC(=N2)C(=O)N[C@H]3[C@]4(CC[C@H](C4)C3(C)C)C)C5=CC(=C(C=C5)Cl)C
- InChI: InChI=1S/C29H34ClN3O/c1-18-6-8-20(9-7-18)17-33-25(21-10-11-23(30)19(2)14-21)15-24(32-33)26(34)31-27-28(3,4)22-12-13-29(27,5)16-22/h6-11,14-15,22,27H,12-13,16-17H2,1-5H3,(H,31,34)/t22-,27-,29+/m1/s1; Key:SUGVYNSRNKFXQM-XRHWURSXSA-N

SR144528 is a drug that acts as a potent and highly selective CB_{2} receptor inverse agonist, with a K_{i} of 0.6 nM at CB_{2} and 400 nM at the related CB_{1} receptor. It is used in scientific research for investigating the function of the CB_{2} receptor, as well as for studying the effects of CB_{1} receptors in isolation, as few CB_{1} agonists that do not also show significant activity as CB_{2} agonists are available. It has also been found to be an inhibitor of sterol O-acyltransferase, an effect that appears to be independent from its action on CB_{2} receptors.

== See also ==
- NESS-040C5
- Rimonabant
- MN-25
