= CRB-913 =

Experimental weight loss drug

Clinical data
- Other names: CRB913
- Drug class: Cannabinoid receptor antagonist
- ATC code: None

CRB-913 is an experimental weight loss drug that acts as a peripherally selective cannabinoid receptor antagonist.
