= NESS-040C5 =

Chemical compound

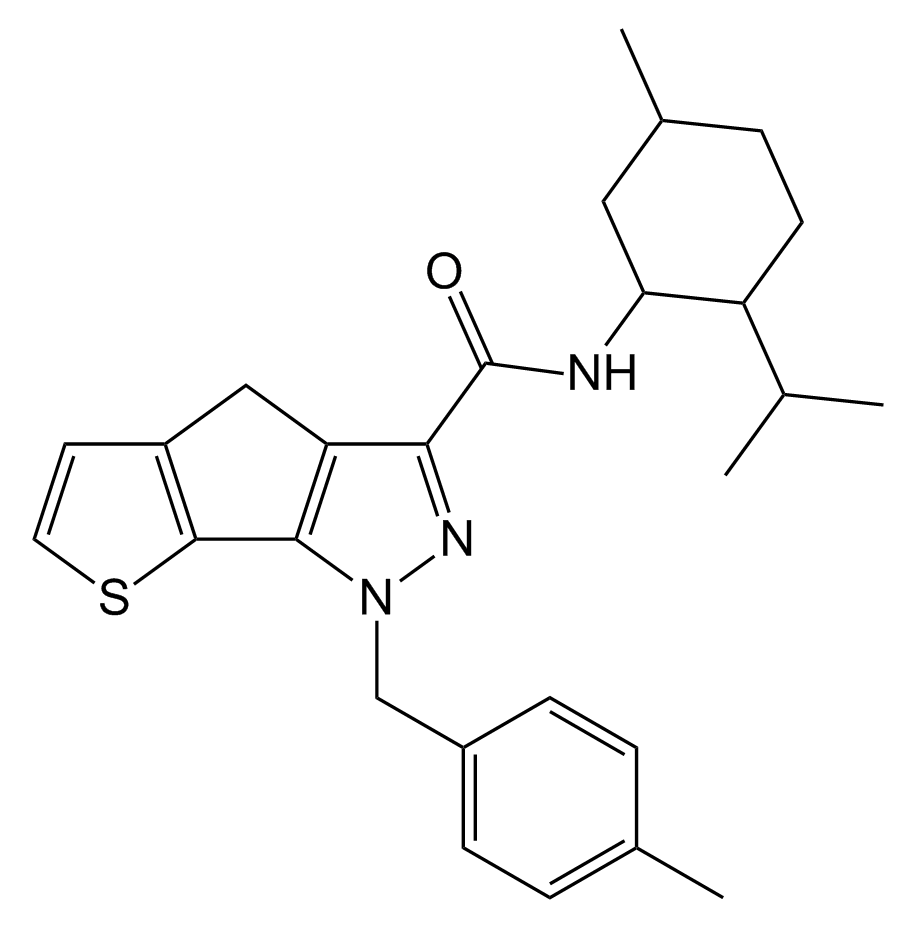

Clinical data
- ATC code: none

Legal status
- Legal status: CA: Schedule II

Identifiers
- IUPAC name: N-(2-isopropyl-5-methylcyclohexyl)-1-(4-methylbenzyl)-1,4-dihydrothieno[3',2':4,5]cyclopenta[1,2-c]pyrazole-3-carboxamide
- CAS Number: 1445751-90-5
- PubChem CID: 138402821
- UNII: P6H2AAY2GE
- CompTox Dashboard (EPA): DTXSID201010004

Chemical and physical data
- Formula: C_{27}H_{33}N_{3}OS
- Molar mass: 447.64 g·mol^{−1}
- 3D model (JSmol): Interactive image
- SMILES: CC(C=C1)=CC=C1CN2C3=C(CC4=C3SC=C4)C(C(NC5CC(C)CCC5C(C)C)=O)=N2

NESS-040C5 is a potent cannabinoid agonist which was developed for the treatment of glaucoma. It has reasonable selectivity for the CB_{2} receptor subtype, having a CB_{2} affinity of 0.4nM, and 25x selectivity over the related CB_{1} receptor.

== See also ==
- AB-FUBINACA
- NESS-0327
- SR-144,528
