= AM-251 (drug) =

Chemical compound

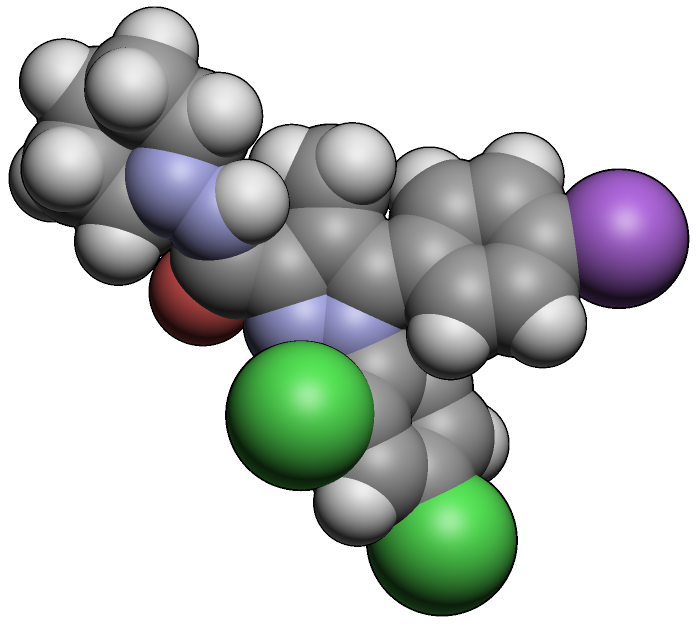

Identifiers
- IUPAC name: 1-(2,4-Dichlorophenyl)-5-(4-iodophenyl)-4-methyl-N-(1-piperidyl)pyrazole-3-carboxamide
- CAS Number: 183232-66-8
- PubChem CID: 2125
- IUPHAR/BPS: 3317
- ChemSpider: 2040
- UNII: 3I4FA44MAI
- ChEBI: CHEBI:90724
- ChEMBL: ChEMBL285932
- CompTox Dashboard (EPA): DTXSID7042695
- ECHA InfoCard: 100.162.062

Chemical and physical data
- Formula: C_{22}H_{21}Cl_{2}IN_{4}O
- Molar mass: 555.24 g·mol^{−1}
- 3D model (JSmol): Interactive image
- SMILES: O=C(NN1CCCCC1)c4nn(c2ccc(Cl)cc2Cl)c(c3ccc(I)cc3)c4C
- InChI: InChI=1S/C22H21Cl2IN4O/c1-14-20(22(30)27-28-11-3-2-4-12-28)26-29(19-10-7-16(23)13-18(19)24)21(14)15-5-8-17(25)9-6-15/h5-10,13H,2-4,11-12H2,1H3,(H,27,30); Key:BUZAJRPLUGXRAB-UHFFFAOYSA-N

AM-251 is an inverse agonist at the CB_{1} cannabinoid receptor. AM-251 is structurally very close to rimonabant; both are biarylpyrazole cannabinoid receptor antagonists. In AM-251, the p-chloro group attached to the phenyl substituent at C-5 of the pyrazole ring is replaced with a p-iodo group. The resulting compound exhibits slightly better binding affinity for the CB_{1} receptor (with a K_{i} value of 7.5 nM) than rimonabant, which has a K_{i} value of 11.5 nM, AM-251 is, however, about two-fold more selective for the CB_{1} receptor when compared to rimonabant. Like rimonabant, it is additionally a μ-opioid receptor antagonist that attenuates analgesic effects.

AM251 has shown an in vitro antimelanoma activity against pancreatic and colon cancer cells.

== See also ==
- Discovery and development of Cannabinoid Receptor 1 Antagonists
