= Surinabant =

Chemical compound

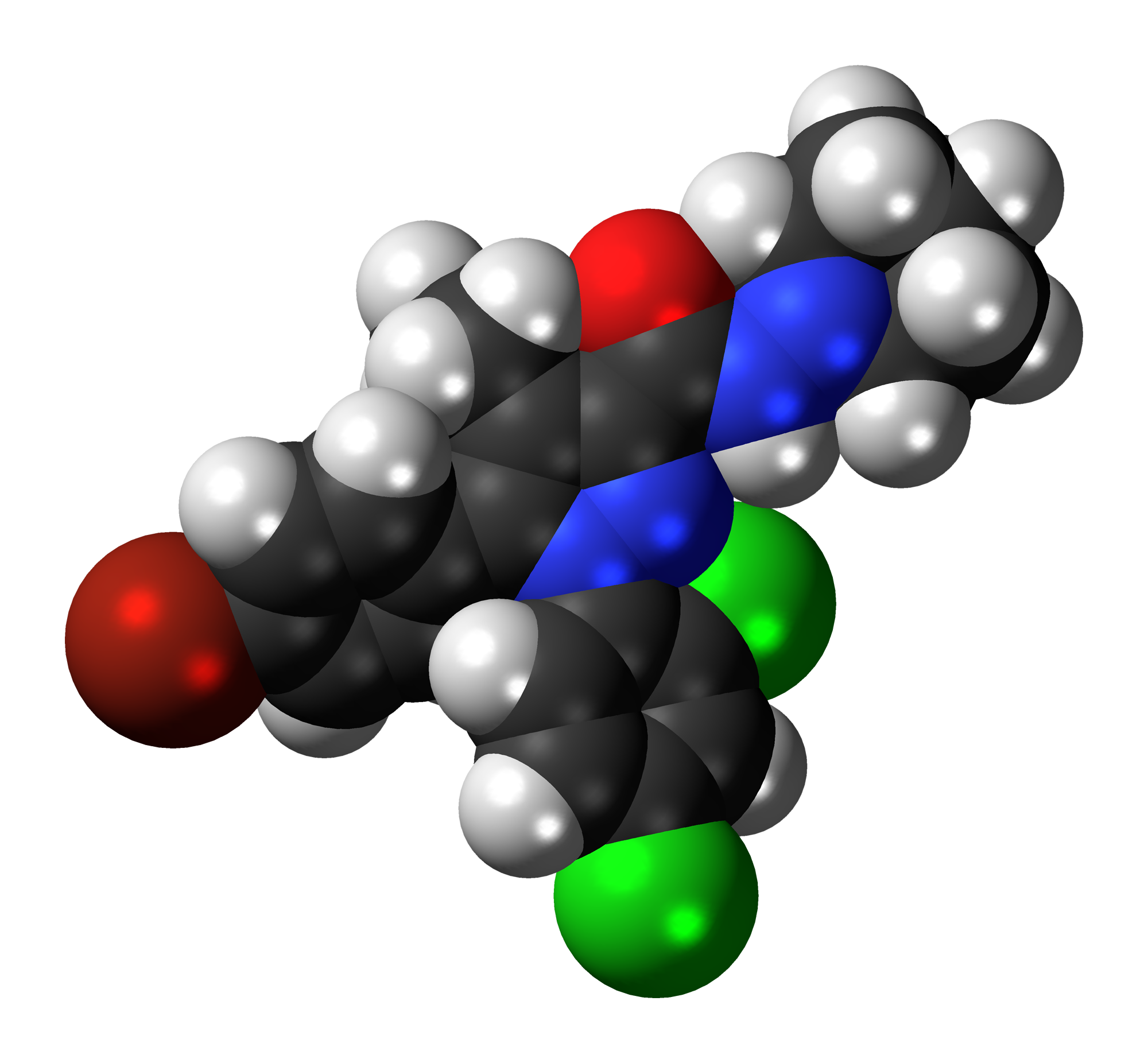

Clinical data
- ATC code: none

Identifiers
- IUPAC name: 5-(4-bromophenyl)-1-(2,4-dichlorophenyl)-4-ethyl-N-(1-piperidinyl)-1H-pyrazole-3-carboxamide
- CAS Number: 288104-79-0
- PubChem CID: 9849616
- ChemSpider: 8025329
- UNII: SF8R9VCB0X
- ChEMBL: ChEMBL189676
- CompTox Dashboard (EPA): DTXSID2047357

Chemical and physical data
- Formula: C_{23}H_{23}BrCl_{2}N_{4}O
- Molar mass: 522.27 g·mol^{−1}
- 3D model (JSmol): Interactive image
- SMILES: O=C(NN1CCCCC1)c4nn(c2ccc(Cl)cc2Cl)c(c3ccc(Br)cc3)c4CC
- InChI: InChI=1S/C23H23BrCl2N4O/c1-2-18-21(23(31)28-29-12-4-3-5-13-29)27-30(20-11-10-17(25)14-19(20)26)22(18)15-6-8-16(24)9-7-15/h6-11,14H,2-5,12-13H2,1H3,(H,28,31); Key:HMXDWDSNPRNUKI-UHFFFAOYSA-N

Surinabant (SR147778) is a cannabinoid receptor type 1 antagonist developed by Sanofi-Aventis. It is being investigated as a potential treatment for nicotine addiction, to assist smoking cessation. It may also be developed as an anorectic drug to assist with weight loss, however there are already several CB_{1} antagonists or inverse agonists on the market or under development for this application, so surinabant is at present mainly being developed as an anti-smoking drug, with possible application in the treatment of other addictive disorders such as alcoholism. Other potential applications such as treatment of ADHD have also been proposed.

A dose ranging study was done for smoking cessation in 2012; it did not improve success rate, but reduced weight gain. Inhibition of THC effects on heart rate was seen at 20 mg and 60 mg but not 5 mg.

== See also ==
- Cannabinoid receptor antagonist
- List of investigational antipsychotics
- O-1269
