= Taranabant =

Chemical compound

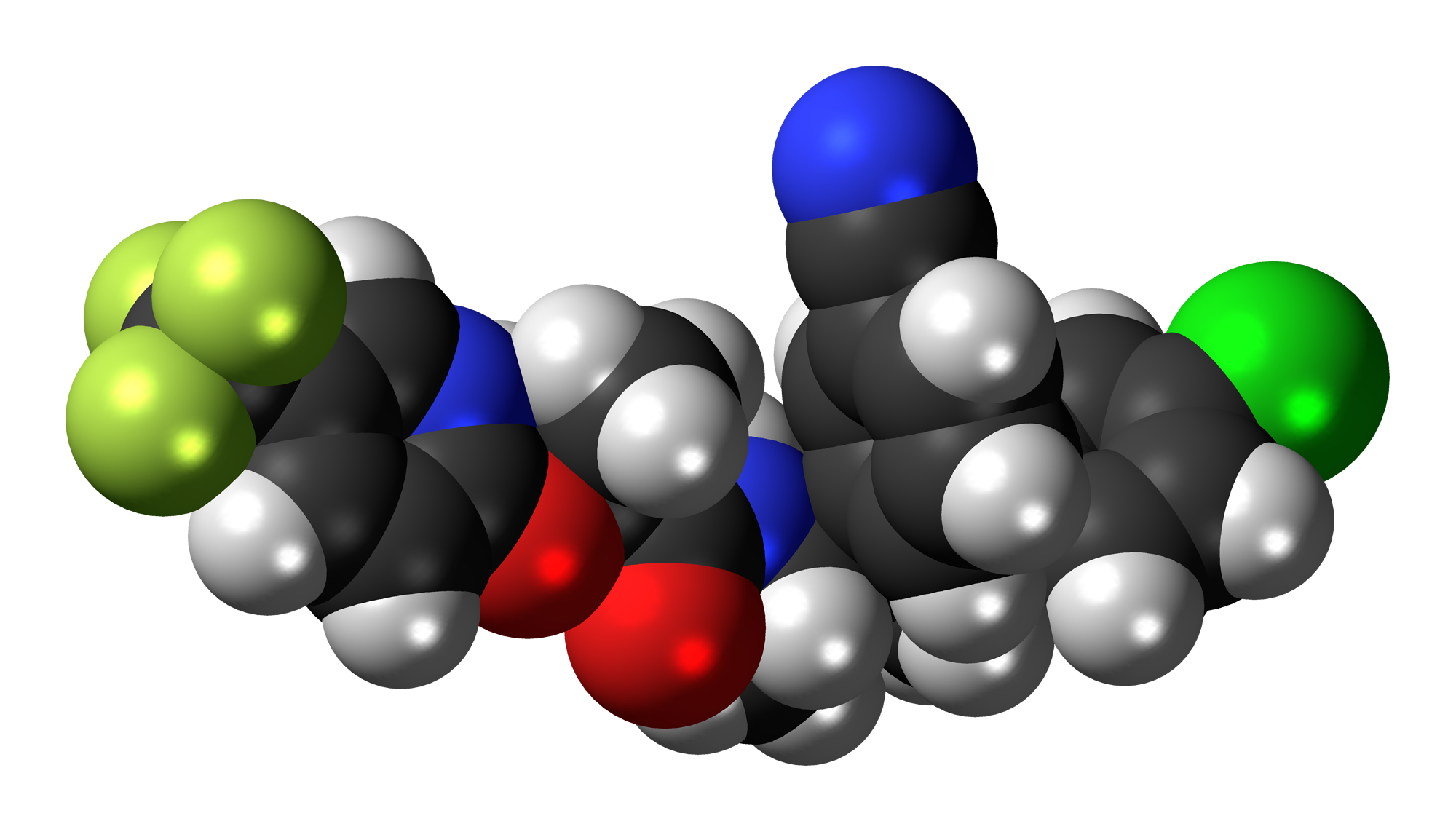

Clinical data
- Routes of administration: Oral
- ATC code: A08AX (WHO)

Legal status
- Legal status: Investigational (failed)

Identifiers
- IUPAC name: N-[(2S,3S)-4-(4-chlorophenyl)-3-(3-cyanophenyl)-2-butanyl]-2-methyl-2-{[5-(trifluoromethyl)-2-pyridinyl]oxy}propanamide
- CAS Number: 701977-09-5
- PubChem CID: 11226090
- ChemSpider: 9401143
- UNII: X9U622S114
- CompTox Dashboard (EPA): DTXSID60220464
- ECHA InfoCard: 100.207.983

Chemical and physical data
- Formula: C_{27}H_{25}ClF_{3}N_{3}O_{2}
- Molar mass: 515.96 g·mol^{−1}
- 3D model (JSmol): Interactive image
- SMILES: C[C@@H]([C@@H](CC1=CC=C(C=C1)Cl)C2=CC=CC(=C2)C#N)NC(=O)C(C)(C)OC3=NC=C(C=C3)C(F)(F)F
- InChI: InChI=1S/C27H25ClF3N3O2/c1-17(34-25(35)26(2,3)36-24-12-9-21(16-33-24)27(29,30)31)23(14-18-7-10-22(28)11-8-18)20-6-4-5-19(13-20)15-32/h4-13,16-17,23H,14H2,1-3H3,(H,34,35)/t17-,23+/m0/s1; Key:QLYKJCMUNUWAGO-GAJHUEQPSA-N

Taranabant (codenamed MK-0364) is a cannabinoid receptor type 1 (CB_{1}) inverse agonist that was investigated as a potential treatment for obesity due to its anorectic effects. It was developed by Merck & Co.

In October 2008, Merck stopped its phase III clinical trials with the drug due to high level of central nervous system side effects, mainly depression and anxiety.

== See also ==
- Cannabinoid receptor antagonist
