= USS Inflict (AM-251) =

Minesweeper of the United States Navy

History

United States
- Name: USS Inflict
- Builder: Savannah Machine and Foundry Company
- Laid down: 26 October 1943
- Launched: 16 January 1944
- Commissioned: 28 August 1944
- Decommissioned: 6 November 1946
- Fate: Transferred to the Maritime Commission and sold 8 October 1948

General characteristics
- Class & type: Admirable-class minesweeper
- Displacement: 650 tons
- Length: 184 ft 6 in (56.24 m)
- Beam: 33 ft (10 m)
- Draft: 9 ft 9 in (2.97 m)
- Propulsion: 2 × ALCO 539 diesel engines, 1,710 shp (1.3 MW); Farrel-Birmingham single reduction gear; 2 shafts
- Speed: 14.8 knots (27.4 km/h)
- Complement: 104
- Armament: 1 × 3"/50 caliber gun DP; 2 × twin Bofors 40 mm guns; 1 × Hedgehog anti-submarine mortar; 2 × Depth charge tracks

Service record
- Part of: US Atlantic Fleet (1944-1945); US Pacific Fleet (1945-1946)
- Operations: Battle of Okinawa
- Awards: 3 Battle stars

USS Inflict (AM-251) was an Admirable-class minesweeper built for the U.S. Navy during World War II to clear offshore minefields and served the Navy in both the North Atlantic Ocean and the Pacific Ocean. At war's end, she returned home with three battle stars to her credit.

Inflict was laid down 26 October 1943 by Savannah Machine & Foundry Co., Savannah, Georgia; launched 16 January 1944; and commissioned 28 August 1944.

== World War II North Atlantic operations ==
After shakedown and minesweeping exercises off the Virginia coast, Inflict arrived Casco Bay, Maine, 30 October 1944 for antisubmarine warfare exercises. Following upkeep at Norfolk, Virginia, she arrived Miami, Florida, 1 December 1944 for duty as training school ship. Inflict trained student officers until 1 April 1945 when she sailed for the U.S. West Coast, arriving San Diego, California, 5 May 1945.

== Transfer to the Pacific Fleet ==
Two days later she sailed for the Far East, and engaged in convoy escort duty and minesweeping off Okinawa while American units ashore fought against the opposition. After the Americans declared the island secured 21 June 1945, Inflict operated out of it as a base.

== End-of-War Activity ==
From 13 to 23 August 1945 she swept minefields on Kyūshū clearing the way for vessels bringing American occupation forces. She then returned to Okinawa to prepare for occupation duty.

As the greatest sea war in history ended in Allied victory, Inflict departed Okinawa 30 August 1945 for operations in Korea, Formosa, and Japan, remaining there until January 1946.

The minesweeper returned to San Pedro, California, 17 February 1946 for training and readiness operations.

== Post-War Decommissioning ==
After a summer cruise to Guam and Pearl Harbor, she arrived Bremerton, Washington in mid-October 1946, decommissioning there 6 November 1946. Inflict was transferred to the Maritime Commission 8 October 1948 and released to her purchaser, Ricardo Granola, the same day. She was renamed Manabi and placed into mercantile service. Her ultimate fate is not known.

== Awards ==
Inflict received three battle stars for World War II service.
