= Steroidogenesis inhibitor =

Drug class

- Drug class

Class identifiers
- Synonyms: Steroid biosynthesis inhibitor; Steroid synthesis inhibitor
- Use: Various
- Biological target: Steroidogenic enzymes
- Chemical class: Steroidal; Nonsteroidal

Legal status

A steroidogenesis inhibitor, also known as a steroid biosynthesis inhibitor, is a type of drug which inhibits one or more of the enzymes that are involved in the process of steroidogenesis, the biosynthesis of endogenous steroids and steroid hormones. They may inhibit the production of cholesterol and other sterols, sex steroids such as androgens, estrogens, and progestogens, corticosteroids such as glucocorticoids and mineralocorticoids, and neurosteroids. They are used in the treatment of a variety of medical conditions that depend on endogenous steroids.

Steroidogenesis inhibitors are analogous in effect and use to antigonadotropins (which specifically inhibit gonadal sex steroid production), but work via a different mechanism of action; whereas antigonadotropins suppress gonadal production of sex steroids by effecting negative feedback on and thereby suppressing the hypothalamic–pituitary–gonadal axis, steroidogenesis inhibitors directly inhibit the enzymatic biosynthesis of steroids.

== Types, examples, and uses ==
=== Cholesterol synthesis inhibitors ===
Cholesterol biosynthesis from acetyl-CoA.

==== Acetyl-CoA to lanosterol inhibitors ====
- HMG-CoA reductase (HMGCR) inhibitors, also known as statins, prevent the conversion of HMG-CoA into mevalonic acid, a relatively early step in the biosynthesis of cholesterol from acetyl coenzyme A (acetyl-CoA), and thereby decrease cholesterol levels. Examples of statins include atorvastatin, lovastatin, rosuvastatin, and simvastatin. They are used in the treatment of hypercholesterolemia for the purpose of lowering the risk of atherosclerosis-related cardiovascular disease.
- Farnesyl pyrophosphate synthase (FPPS) inhibitors prevent the conversion of isopentenyl pyrophosphate (IPP) into farnesyl pyrophosphate (FPP), a mid-range step in the biosynthesis of cholesterol from acetyl-CoA, and thereby inhibit cholesterol production. They notably do not significantly lower circulating levels of cholesterol however, and hence, unlike statins, are not suitable for the treatment of hypercholesterolemia. The main examples of FPPS inhibitors are nitrogenous bisphosphonates such as alendronate, ibandronate, pamidronate, risedronate, and zoledronate, which are used in the treatment of osteoporosis.
- Other early-stage cholesterol synthesis inhibitors like colestolone.

==== Lanosterol to cholesterol inhibitors ====
- 7-Dehydrocholesterol reductase (7-DHCR) inhibitors such as AY-9944 and BM-15766 inhibit the production of cholesterol from 7-dehydrocholesterol, one of the last steps in cholesterol biosynthesis. Loss-of-function mutations in the gene encoding 7-DHCR result in Smith–Lemli–Opitz syndrome (SLOS) and dramatic accumulation of 7-dehydrocholesterol. 7-DHCR inhibitors produce an acquired form of SLOS in animals, and as such, like 24-DHCR inhibitors (see below), are probably too toxic to be used clinically.
- 24-Dehydrocholesterol reductase (24-DHCR) inhibitors such as azacosterol and triparanol inhibit the production of cholesterol from desmosterol, one of the last steps in cholesterol biosynthesis, and were formerly used to treat hypercholesterolemia, but were withdrawn from the market due to toxicity caused by accumulation of desmosterol in tissues.

=== Steroid hormone synthesis inhibitors ===
Steroidogenesis, biosynthesis of steroid hormones from cholesterol.

==== Non-specific steroid hormone synthesis inhibitors ====
- Cholesterol side-chain cleavage enzyme (P450scc, CYP11A1) inhibitors such as aminoglutethimide, ketoconazole, and mitotane inhibit the production of pregnenolone from cholesterol and thereby prevent the synthesis of all steroid hormones. They have been used to inhibit corticosteroid synthesis in the treatment of Cushing's syndrome and adrenocortical carcinoma, and ketoconazole has also been used to inhibit androgen production in the treatment of prostate cancer.
- 3β-Hydroxysteroid dehydrogenase (3β-HSD) inhibitors such as amphenone B, azastene, cyanoketone, epostane, mitotane, and trilostane inhibit the conversion of Δ^{5}-3β-hydroxysteroids into Δ^{4}-3-ketosteroids and thereby inhibit the production of most of the steroid hormones. Due to inhibition of progesterone biosynthesis, they have been investigated as contraceptives and abortifacients (though ultimately have never been marketed for this indication), and trilostane was formerly used to inhibit corticosteroid synthesis in the treatment of Cushing's syndrome.
- 17α-Hydroxylase/17,20-lyase (CYP17A1) inhibitors such as abiraterone acetate, etomidate, galeterone, ketoconazole, and orteronel inhibit the production of androgens and glucocorticoids and are used to reduce androgen levels in the treatment of prostate cancer. Selective 17,20-lyase inhibitors such as seviteronel inhibit only androgen production without affecting glucocorticoid synthesis and are under development for the treatment of prostate cancer.

==== Corticosteroid-specific synthesis inhibitors ====
- 21-Hydroxylase (CYP21A2) inhibitors prevent the production of corticosteroids from progesterone and 17α-hydroxyprogesterone.
- 11β-Hydroxylase (CYP11B1) inhibitors such as amphenone B, etomidate, ketoconazole, metyrapone, mitotane, and osilodrostat inhibit the production of the potent corticosteroids cortisol, corticosterone, and aldosterone from the less potent corticosteroids 11-deoxycorticosterone and 11-deoxycortisol and are used in the diagnosis and treatment of Cushing's syndrome.
- Aldosterone synthase (CYP11B2) inhibitors such as metyrapone, mitotane, and osilodrostat prevent the production of the potent mineralocorticoid aldosterone from the less potent mineralocorticoid corticosterone. Osilodrostat was investigated for the treatment of hypertension, heart failure, and renal disease, but development for these indications was discontinued.

==== Sex steroid-specific synthesis inhibitors ====
- 17β-Hydroxysteroid dehydrogenase (17β-HSD) inhibitors prevent the reversible conversion of the weak androgens dehydroepiandrosterone (DHEA) and 4-androstenedione into the more potent androgen testosterone and the weak estrogen estrone into the more potent estrogen estradiol.
- 5α-Reductase inhibitors (5-ARIs) such as finasteride, dutasteride, epristeride, and alfatradiol prevent the conversion of testosterone into the more potent androgen dihydrotestosterone (DHT) and are used in the treatment of benign prostatic hyperplasia (BPH) and androgenic alopecia (pattern hair loss). These drugs also inhibit the formation of neurosteroids such as allopregnanolone, tetrahydrodeoxycorticosterone (THDOC), and 3α-androstanediol from progesterone, 11-deoxycorticosterone, and DHT, respectively, which may contribute to side effects such as depression and sexual dysfunction.
- Aromatase inhibitors (AIs) such as aminoglutethimide, anastrozole, exemestane, letrozole, and testolactone inhibit the production of estrogens from androgens and are used mainly in the treatment of estrogen receptor-positive breast cancer.
- Steroid sulfotransferase (SST) inhibitors prevent the conversion of steroid hormones such as estrone and DHEA into hormonally inactive steroid sulfates. Although hormonally inactive, some steroid sulfates, such as pregnenolone sulfate and DHEA sulfate, are important neurosteroids.
- Steroid sulfatase (STS) inhibitors such as estradiol sulfamate, estrone sulfamate, irosustat, and danazol inhibit the conversion of steroid sulfates such as estrone sulfate and DHEA sulfate into their hormonally active forms. They have potential applications in the treatment of breast cancer and endometriosis, and are currently under investigation for such indications.

=== Other steroid synthesis inhibitors ===
- Lanosterol 14α-demethylase (CYP51A1) inhibitors such as clotrimazole, fluconazole, itraconazole, ketoconazole, miconazole, and voriconazole prevent the production of ergosterol from lanosterol. Ergosterol is absent in animals but is an essential component of the cell membranes of many fungi and protozoa, and so lanosterol 14α-demethylase inhibitors are used as antifungals and antiprotozoals in the treatment of infections.

== List of steroid metabolism modulators ==
Enzyme	Substrates→Products	Inhibitors	Inducers
HMG-CoA reductase (HMGCR)	HMG-CoA→Mevalonic acid	Atorvastatin • Cerivastatin • Colestolone • Fluvastatin • Lovastatin • Mevastatin • Pitavastatin • Pravastatin • Rosuvastatin • Simvastatin	
FPPS	Dimethylallyl pyrophosphate (isoprenyl pyrophosphate)→Farnesyl pyrophosphate • Isopentenyl pyrophosphate→Farnesyl pyrophosphate	Alendronic acid • Ibandronic acid • Incadronic acid • Pamidronic acid • Risedronic acid • Zoledronic acid	
7-DHCR	7-Dehydrocholesterol→Cholesterol	AY-9944 • BM-15766 • Triparanol	
24-DHCR	Desmosterol→Cholesterol	Azacosterol • Clomifene • Triparanol • WY-3457	
P450scc (CYP11A1)	Cholesterol→22R-Hydroxycholesterol • 22R-Hydroxycholesterol→20α,22R-Dihydroxycholesterol • 20α,22R-Dihydroxycholesterol→Pregnenolone	22-ABC • 3,3′-Dimethoxybenzidine • 3-Methoxybenzidine • Aminoglutethimide • Amphenone B • Canrenone • Cyanoketone • Danazol • Etomidate • Ketoconazole • Levoketoconazole • Mitotane • Spironolactone • Trilostane	
3β-HSD (HSD3B)	Pregnenolone→Progesterone • 17α-Hydroxypregnenolone→17α-Hydroxyprogesterone • Dehydroepiandrosterone→Androstenedione • 5-Androstenediol→Testosterone • Androstadienol→Androstadienone	4-MA • Δ^{4}-Abiraterone • Abiraterone • Abiraterone acetate • Amphenone B • Azastene • Cyanoketone • Cyproterone acetate • Danazol • Epostane • Genistein • Gestrinone • Medrogestone • Medroxyprogesterone acetate • Metribolone • Metyrapone • Norethisterone • Oxymetholone • Pioglitazone • Rosiglitazone • Trilostane • Troglitazone	
17α-Hydroxylase, 17,20-lyase (CYP17A1)	Pregnenolone→17α-Hydroxypregnenolone • Progesterone→17α-Hydroxyprogesterone • 17α-Hydroxypregnenolone→Dehydroepiandrosterone • 17α-Hydroxyprogesterone→Androstenedione	22-ABC • 22-Oxime • Δ^{4}-Abiraterone • Abiraterone • Abiraterone acetate • Amphenone B • Bifluranol • Bifonazole • Canrenone • CFG-920 • Clotrimazole • Cyanoketone • Cyproterone acetate • Danazol • Econazole • Etomidate • Flutamide • Galeterone • Gestrinone • Isoconazole • Ketoconazole • L-39 • Levoketoconazole • Liarozole • LY-207,320 • MDL-27,302 • Miconazole • Mifepristone • Nilutamide • Orteronel • Pioglitazone • Prochloraz • Rosiglitazone • Seviteronel • Spironolactone • Stanozolol • SU-9055 • SU-10603 • TGF-β • Tioconazole • Troglitazone • VN/87-1 • YM116	
11β-HSD (HSD11B)	Cortisol↔Cortisone	11-Ketoprogesterone • 11α-Hydroxyprogesterone • 11β-Hydroxyprogesterone • 18α-Glycyrrhizic acid • ABT-384 • Acetoxolone • Amphenone B • Carbenoxolone • Enoxolone (glycyrrhetinic acid) • Epigallocatechin gallate • Glycyrrhizin (glycyrrhizic acid) (licorice) • Progesterone	
21-Hydroxylase (CYP21A2)	Progesterone→11-Deoxycorticosterone • 17α-Hydroxyprogesterone→11-Deoxycortisol	Aminoglutethimide • Amphenone B • Bifonazole • Canrenone • Clotrimazole • Diazepam • Econazole • Genistein • Isoconazole • Ketoconazole • Levoketoconazole • Metyrapone • Miconazole • Midazolam • Spironolactone • Abiraterone • Abiraterone acetate • Tioconazole	
11β-Hydroxylase (CYP11B1)	11-Deoxycorticosterone→Corticosterone • 11-Deoxycortisol→Cortisol	Δ^{4}-Abiraterone • Abiraterone • Abiraterone acetate • Aminoglutethimide • Canrenone • Etomidate • Fadrozole • FETO • Ketoconazole • Levoketoconazole • Metomidate • Metyrapol • Metyrapone • Mitotane • Potassium canrenoate • Spironolactone • Trilostane• Osilodrostat	
Aldosterone synthase (CYP11B2)	Corticosterone→Aldosterone	18-Ethynylprogesterone (18-ethinylprogesterone) • 18-Vinylprogesterone • Aminoglutethimide • Azelnidipine • Benidipine • Canrenone • Cilnidipine • Efonidipine • FAD286 • Fadrozole • Ketoconazole • Metyrapone • Mespirenone • Osilodrostat • Potassium canrenoate • Spironolactone	
17β-HSD (HSD17B)	Dehydroepiandrosterone↔5-Androstenediol • Androstenedione↔Testosterone • Estrone↔Estradiol	Danazol • Ethanol • Fisetin • RM-532-105 • Simvastatin • STX-2171 • STX-2622 • STX-2624	
5α-Reductase (SRD5A)	Cholestenone→5α-Cholestanone • Progesterone→5α-Dihydroprogesterone • 3α-Dihydroprogesterone→Allopregnanolone • 3β-Dihydroprogesterone→Isopregnanolone • Deoxycorticosterone→5α-Dihydrodeoxycorticosterone • Corticosterone→5α-Dihydrocorticosterone • Cortisol→5α-Dihydrocortisol • Aldosterone→5α-Dihydroaldosterone • Androstenedione→5α-Androstanedione • Testosterone→5α-Dihydrotestosterone • Androstadienone→Androstenone	22-Oxime • Δ^{4}-Abiraterone • Abiraterone • Abiraterone acetate • Alfatradiol • Azelaic acid • β-Sitosterol • Bexlosteride • Chlormadinone acetate • Cl-4AS-1 • Dutasteride • Epitestosterone • Epristeride • Fatty acids (α-linolenic acid, linoleic acid, γ-linolenic acid, monolinolein, oleic acid) • Finasteride • Ganoderic acid • Gestodene • Izonsteride • L-39 • Lapisteride • Oxendolone • Saw palmetto extract • TFM-4AS-1 • Turosteride • Vitamin B6 • Zinc	
3α-HSD (AKR1C4)	5α-Dihydroprogesterone↔Allopregnanolone • DHDOC↔THDOC • Dihydrotestosterone↔3α-Androstanediol	Coumestrol • Daidzein • Genistein • Indometacin • Medroxyprogesterone acetate	Fluoxetine • Fluvoxamine • Mirtazapine • Paroxetine • Sertraline • Venlafaxine
Aromatase (CYP19A1)	16α-Hydroxyandrostenedione→16α-Hydroxyestrone • Androstenedione→Estrone • Nandrolone→Estradiol • Metandienone→Methylestradiol • Methyltestosterone→Methylestradiol • Testosterone→Estradiol	4-AT • 4-Cyclohexylaniline • 4'-Hydroxynorendoxifen • 4-Hydroxytestosterone • 5α-DHNET • 20α-Dihydroprogesterone • Abyssinone II • alpha-Naphthoflavone • Aminoglutethimide • Anastrozole • Ascorbic acid (vitamin C) • Atamestane • ATD • Bifonazole • CGP-45,688 • CGS-47,645 • Chalconoids (e.g., isoliquiritigenin) • Clotrimazole • Corynesidone A • Coumestrol • DHT • Difeconazole • Econazole • Ellagitannins • Endosulfan • Exemestane • Fadrozole • Fatty acids (e.g., conjugated linoleic acid, linoleic acid, linolenic acid, palmitic acid) • Fenarimol • Finrozole • Flavonoids (e.g., 7-hydroxyflavone, 7-hydroxyflavanone, 7,8-DHF, acacetin, apigenin, baicalein, biochanin A, chrysin, EGCG, gossypetin, hesperetin, liquiritigenin, myricetin, naringenin, pinocembrin, rotenone, quercetin, sakuranetin, tectochrysin) • Formestane • Imazalil • Isoconazole • Ketoconazole • Leflutrozole • Letrozole • Liarozole • Melatonin • MEN-11066 • Miconazole • Minamestane • Nimorazole • NKS01 • Norendoxifen • ORG-33,201 • Penconazole • Phenytoin • PGE2 (dinoprostone) • Plomestane • Prochloraz • Propiconazole • Quinolinoids (e.g., berberine, casimiroin, triptoquinone A, XHN22, XHN26, XHN27) • Resorcylic acid lactones (e.g., zearalenone) • Rogletimide (pyridoglutethimide) • Stilbenoids (e.g., resveratrol) • Terpenoids (e.g., dehydroabietic acid, (–)-dehydrololiolide, retinol (vitamin A), Δ^{9}-THC, tretinoin) • Testolactone • Tioconazole • Triadimefon • Triadimenol • Troglitazone • Valproic acid • Vorozole • Xanthones (e.g., garcinone D, garcinone E, α-mangostin, γ-mangostin, monodictyochrome A, monodictyochrome B) • YM-511 • Zinc	Atrazine • Flavonoids (e.g., genistein, quercetin)
SST/EST	Dehydroepiandrosterone→Dehydroepiandrosterone sulfate • Estrone→Estrone sulfate	4′OH-CB79 • 6-Hydroxyflavone • 2,6-Dichloro-4-nitrophenol (DCNP) • 7,8-Dihydroxyflavone • Equol • Galangin • Genistein • Parabens (e.g., butylparaben) • Pentachlorophenol (PCP) • Triclosan	
STS	Cholesterol sulfate→Cholesterol • Dehydroepiandrosterone sulfate→Dehydroepiandrosterone • Estrone sulfate→Estrone • Pregnenolone sulfate→Pregnenolone	AHBS • Danazol • Estradiol sulfamate (E2MATE) • Estrone sulfamate (EMATE) • Irosustat (STX64, 667 Coumate, BN-83495) • KW-2581 • SR-16157 • STX213 • STX681 • STX1938	
Sterol 27-hydroxylase (CYP27A1)	Cholesterol→27-Hydroxycholesterol	Anastrozole • Bicalutamide • Dexmedetomidine • Fadrozole • Posaconazole • Ravuconazole	
Cholesterol 7α-hydroxylase (CYP7A1)	Cholesterol→7α-Hydroxycholesterol (intermediate to bile acids)	Ketoconazole • Levoketoconazole	
Lanosterol 14α-demethylase (CYP51A1)	Lanosterol→4,4-Dimethylcholesta-8(9),14,24-trien-3β-ol (intermediate to ergosterol)	Albaconazole • Aliconazole • Alteconazole • Arasertaconazole • Azaconazole • Azalanstat • Becliconazole • Bifonazole • Brolaconazole • Butoconazole • Chlormidazole • Cisconazole • Clotrimazole • Croconazole • Cyproconazole • Democonazole • Diniconazole • Doconazole • Eberconazole • Econazole • Econazole/triamcinolone • Efinaconazole • Embeconazole • Enilconazole • Etaconazole • Fenticonazole • Fluconazole • Flutrimazole • Fosfluconazole • Furconazole • Hexaconazole • Isavuconazole • Isavuconazonium chloride • Isavuconazonium sulfate • Isoconazole • Itraconazole • Ketoconazole • Lanoconazole • Levoketoconazole • Luliconazole • Miconazole • Neticonazole • Omoconazole • Orconazole • Oxiconazole • Parconazole • Penconazole • Posaconazole • Propiconazole • Pramiconazole • Quilseconazole • Ravuconazole • Saperconazole • Sertaconazole • Sulconazole • Tebuconazole • Terconazole (triaconazole) • Tioconazole • Uniconazole • Valconazole • Voriconazole • Zinoconazole • Zoficonazole	

== See also ==
- Steroidogenic enzyme
- Neurosteroidogenesis inhibitor
