= List of cytochrome P450 modulators =

This is a list of cytochrome P450 modulators, or inhibitors and inducers of cytochrome P450 enzymes.

Enzyme	Inhibitors	Inducers
CYP1A1	Certain foods (e.g., cumin, turmeric); Certain herbs/herbal teas (e.g., peppermint, German chamomile, dandelion, Kava); Amiodarone; Caffeine; Cimetidine; Citalopram; Crisaborole; Echinacea; Efavirenz; Fluoroquinolones (e.g., ciprofloxacin); Fluvoxamine; Interferon; Isoniazid; Methoxsalen; Mibefradil; Naringenin (grapefruit); Nilutamide; Ribociclib; Rucaparib; Simeprevir; St. John's wort; Ticlopidine; Verapamil	Certain foods (e.g., broccoli, cauliflower, brussels sprouts, chargrilled meat); Armodafinil; Insulin; Methylcholanthrene; Modafinil; Nafcillin; Omeprazole; Phenytoin; beta-Naphthoflavone; Tobacco
CYP2A6	Amiodarone; Amlodipine; Buprenorphine; Clofibrate; Clotrimazole; Desipramine; Disulfiram; Entacapone; Fenofibrate; Flavonoids (grapefruit); Gabapentin; Isoniazid; Ketoconazole; Letrozole; Methimazole; Methoxsalen; Metyrapone; Miconazole; Modafinil; Nicotine; Orphenadrine; Pilocarpine; Pregabalin; Selegiline; Sulconazole; Tioconazole; Tranylcypromine	Barbiturates (e.g., amobarbital, pentobarbital, phenobarbital, secobarbital); Rifampicin
CYP2B6	Clopidogrel; Crisaborole; Curcumin (turmeric); Memantine; Orphenadrine; Rucaparib; Thiotepa; Ticlopidine; Voriconazole; Withania somnifera (Ashwagandha)	Carbamazepine; Phenobarbital; Phenytoin; Rifampicin
CYP2C8	Gemfibrozil; Letermovir; Montelukast; Perampanel; Quercetin; Teriflunomide; Thiazolidinediones; Trimethoprim	Rifampicin; Rifapentine
CYP2C9	Amiodarone; Apigenin; Chloramphenicol; Cimetidine; Cyclizine; Fenofibrate; Flavonoids (e.g., amentoflavone (Ginkgo biloba, St. John’s Wort)); Fluconazole; Fluvastatin; Fluvoxamine; Isoniazid; Kava; Lovastatin; Miconazole; Modafinil; Nilutamide; Paroxetine; Phenylbutazone; Probenecid; Promethazine; Quercetin; Sertraline; Sulfamethoxazole; Sulfaphenazole; Teniposide; Valproic acid; Voriconazole; Zafirlukast	Aprepitant; Bosentan; Carbamazepine; Enzalutamide; Phenobarbital; Phenytoin; Rifampicin; Rifapentine; Secobarbital; St. John's Wort
CYP2C19	Armodafinil; Cannabidiol; Chloramphenicol; Cimetidine; Citalopram; Felbamate; Fluconazole; Fluoxetine; Fluvoxamine; Indomethacin; Isoniazid; JWH-018; Kava; Ketoconazole; Moclobemide; Modafinil; Oxcarbazepine; Probenecid; Proton pump inhibitors (e.g., esomeprazole, lansoprazole, omeprazole, pantoprazole, rabeprazole); Ticlopidine; Topiramate	Artemisinin; Aspirin; Carbamazepine; Enzalutamide; Norethisterone; Phenytoin; Prednisone; Rifampicin
CYP2D6	Amiodarone; Buprenorphine; Bupropion; Cannabidiol; Celecoxib; Chlorphenamine; Chlorpromazine; Cimetidine; Cinacalcet; Citalopram; Clemastine; Clomipramine; Cocaine; Diphenhydramine; Doxepin; Doxorubicin; Duloxetine; Escitalopram; Fluoxetine; Halofantrine; Haloperidol; Hydroxyzine; Hyperforin (St. John's Wort); Kava; Levomepromazine; Methadone; Methylphenidate; Metoclopramide; Mibefradil; Midodrine; Moclobemide; Niacin (nicotinic acid) and its form – niacinamide (nicotinamide), collectively called as vitamin B3; Omeprazole; Paroxetine; Perphenazine; Promethazine; Quinidine; Ranitidine; Risperidone; Ritonavir; Sertraline; Terbinafine; Thioridazine; Ticlopidine; Tripelennamine; Zuclopenthixol	Dexamethasone; Glutethimide; Haloperidol; Rifampicin
CYP2E1	Cimetidine; Niacin (nicotinic acid) and its form – niacinamide (nicotinamide), collectively called as vitamin B3; Clomethiazole	Ethanol (Alcohol (drug)); Isoniazid
CYP3A4	Amiodarone; Aprepitant; Bergamottin (grapefruit); Buprenorphine; Cafestol; Cannabidiol; Chloramphenicol; Cimetidine; Ciprofloxacin; Clarithromycin; Cobicistat; Colchicine; Delavirdine; Diltiazem; Dithiocarbamate; Domperidone; Erythromycin; Esomeprazole; Fluconazole; Fluvoxamine; Gestodene; Ginkgo biloba; Imatinib; Indinavir; Isoniazid; Itraconazole; Kava; Ketoconazole; Mibefradil; Mifepristone; Milk thistle; Nefazodone; Nelfinavir; Niacin (nicotinic acid) and its form – niacinamide (nicotinamide), collectively called as vitamin B3; Nilutamide; Norfloxacin; Omeprazole; Orphenadrine; Pantoprazole; Piperine; Quercetin; Ranitidine; Ritonavir; Saquinavir; Seproxetine ((S)-norfluoxetine/ Fluoxetine metabolite); Star fruit; Telithromycin; Valerian; Valproic acid; Verapamil; Voriconazole	Armodafinil; Barbiturates (e.g., butalbital, phenobarbital); Capsaicin; Carbamazepine; Efavirenz; Enzalutamide; Glucocorticoids; Modafinil; Nevirapine; Oxcarbazepine; Phenytoin; Pioglitazone; Quercetin; Rifabutin; Rifampicin; Rifapentine; St. John's wort; Topiramate; Troglitazone; Withania somnifera (Ashwagandha)
CYP4–51	See Prostanoid signaling modulators and Leukotriene signaling modulators instead for eicosanoid-specific CYP450s, including: CYP4F3 (leukotriene-B4 ω-hydroxylase 2); CYP5A1 (thromboxane-A synthase); CYP8A1 (prostacyclin synthase)	See the list of steroid metabolism modulators instead for steroid/sterol-specific CYP450s, including: CYP7A1 (cholesterol 7α-hydroxylase); CYP7B1 (25-hydroxycholesterol 7α-hydroxylase); CYP8B1 (sterol 12α-hydroxylase); CYP11A1 (cholesterol side-chain cleavage enzyme; P450scc); CYP11B1 (steroid 11β-hydroxylase); CYP11B2 (aldosterone synthase); CYP17A1 (steroid 17α-hydroxylase/17,20-lyase); CYP19A1 (aromatase); CYP21A2 (steroid 21-hydroxylase); CYP24A1 (1,25-dihydroxyvitamin D3 24-hydroxylase); CYP27A1 (sterol 27-hydroxylase); CYP27B1 (25-hydroxyvitamin D3 1α-hydroxylase); CYP39A1 (oxysterol 7α-hydroxylase 2); CYP46A1 (cholesterol 24-hydroxylase); CYP51A1 (lanosterol 14α-demethylase)

== See also ==
- List of steroid metabolism modulators

== Sources ==
Includes information found online including these sites:

- "Indiana University Department of Medicine Clinical Pharmacology Drug Interactions Flockhart Table ™".
- "INHIBITORS, INDUCERS AND SUBSTRATES OF CYTOCHROME P450 ISOZYMES".
- "The Life Raft Group: Long List of Inhibitors and Inducers of CYP3A4 and CYP2D6".
- "DRUGBANK Online: Cytochrome P-450 Enzyme Inhibitors".
- "MEDICATIONS METABOLIZED BY CYTOCHROME P450 3A4" (PDF).
