= Amphenone B =

Chemical compound

Clinical data
- Other names: Amphenone; 3,3-bis(p-Aminophenyl)butan-2-one

Identifiers
- IUPAC name: 3,3-Bis(4-aminophenyl)butan-2-one
- CAS Number: 2686-47-7
- PubChem CID: 17591
- ChemSpider: 16631
- UNII: Y2YUN941SL
- KEGG: C07616
- ChEBI: CHEBI:2678
- CompTox Dashboard (EPA): DTXSID70181370

Chemical and physical data
- Formula: C_{16}H_{18}N_{2}O
- Molar mass: 254.333 g·mol^{−1}
- 3D model (JSmol): Interactive image
- SMILES: CC(=O)C(C)(C1=CC=C(C=C1)N)C2=CC=C(C=C2)N
- InChI: InChI=1S/C16H18N2O/c1-11(19)16(2,12-3-7-14(17)8-4-12)13-5-9-15(18)10-6-13/h3-10H,17-18H2,1-2H3; Key:MKBVGNJXUNEBAL-UHFFFAOYSA-N

Amphenone B, or simply amphenone, also known as 3,3-bis(p-aminophenyl)butan-2-one, is an inhibitor of steroid hormone and thyroid hormone biosynthesis which was never marketed but has been used as a tool in scientific research to study corticosteroids and the adrenal glands. It acts as competitive inhibitor of 11β-hydroxylase, 17α-hydroxylase, 17,20-lyase, 21-hydroxylase, and 3β-hydroxysteroid dehydrogenase, as well as of cholesterol side-chain cleavage enzyme, thereby inhibiting the production of steroid hormones including glucocorticoids, mineralocorticoids, androgens, and estrogens. In addition, amphenone B inhibits the production of thyroxine by a thiouracil-like mechanism, specifically via inhibition of organic binding of iodine and uptake of iodide by the thyroid gland.

Amphenone B was first synthesized in 1950 and is a diphenylmethane derivative that was derived from the insecticide 2,2-di(p-chlorophenyl)-1,1-dichloroethane (p,p'-DDD), which in 1949 had been found to selectively induce adrenal atrophy. In contrast to p,p'-DDD, which has direct cytotoxic effects on the adrenal glands via an unknown mechanism, amphenone B does not have cytotoxic effects, and instead causes adrenal and thyroid gland hypertrophy due to respective inhibition of corticosteroid and thyroxine biosynthesis, subsequent loss of negative feedback on the hypothalamic-pituitary-adrenal and hypothalamic-pituitary-thyroid axes, and consequent hypersecretion of adrenocorticotropic hormone (ACTH) and thyroid-stimulating hormone (TSH) from the pituitary gland.

Amphenone B has also been found to produce progesterone-like progestogenic effects, including uterine hypertrophy and mammary lobuloalveolar development. These effects occurred even in animals that had been ovariectomized and hypophysectomized, suggesting that amphenone B might be acting directly on the target organs. However, it was found that adrenalectomy abolished the progesterone-like effects of amphenone B on the uterus, whereas those of progesterone were retained in the same experimental conditions, supporting the notion that amphenone B was not actually acting directly on the uterus. Conversely, the progesterone-like effects of amphenone B on the mammary glands were found to persist even in adrenalectomized and ovariectomized animals.

Amphenone B was tested in humans in the mid-1950s as a potential treatment for cortisol-dependent conditions such as Cushing's syndrome and adrenocortical carcinoma. In healthy subjects and patients with adrenocortical carcinoma, the drug was found to be effective in decreasing circulating levels of corticosteroids including cortisol, corticosterone, and aldosterone, as well as in decreasing circulating levels of androgens and estrogens. Moreover, due to reduced aldosterone secretion, it caused marked diuresis and increased urinary sodium excretion. Unfortunately, amphenone B also caused many side effects, some severe, including drowsiness, gastrointestinal disturbances such as heartburn, nausea, and vomiting, morbilliform and pruritic rashes, methemoglobinemia, and hepatotoxicity including impaired liver function and hepatomegaly, and these toxicities, as well as the diversity of its effects on various organs (e.g., also possessing antithyroid and even anesthetic activity), precluded its therapeutic use.

Subsequently, analogues of amphenone B with reduced toxicity and improved specificity were developed. One of the most potent of these was metyrapone (2-methyl-1,2-di(pyridin-3-yl)propan-1-one), a selective inhibitor of 11β-hydroxylase, which was selected for clinical development and was eventually approved and marketed in 1958 as a diagnostic agent for Cushing's syndrome. Another was mitotane (o,p'-DDD, or 1,1-(dichlorodiphenyl)-2,2-dichloroethane), an inhibitor of cholesterol side-chain cleavage enzyme and to a lesser extent of other steroidogenic enzymes, which additionally has selective and direct cytotoxic effects on the adrenal glands similarly to p,p'-DDD, and was introduced in 1960 for the treatment of adrenocortical carcinoma. Aminoglutethimide (3-(4-aminophenyl)-3-ethylpiperidine-2,6-dione), which was originally introduced as an anticonvulsant in 1960, is closely related structurally to amphenone B, and following its introduction, was found to cause adrenal insufficiency in patients due to inhibition of cholesterol side-chain cleavage enzyme and suppression of corticosteroid production. The drug was subsequently repurposed for use in the treatment of metastatic breast cancer and Cushing's syndrome.

Amphenone B was originally thought to be 1,2-bis(p-aminophenyl)-2-methylpropan-1-one, but it was discovered in 1957 that the synthesis of amphenone B was accompanied by an unexpected molecular rearrangement and that the drug was actually 3,3-bis-(p-aminophenyl)butan-2-one. As such, early publications of amphenone B, and some subsequent publications, refer to the drug by the incorrect structure.

== See also ==
- Steroidogenesis inhibitor
