= C26H28Cl2N4O4 =

The molecular formula C_{26}H_{28}Cl_{2}N_{4}O_{4} (molar mass: 531.43 g/mol, exact mass: 530.1488 u) may refer to:

- Ketoconazole
- Levoketoconazole
