= Sulfameth =

Sulfameth may refer to:

- Sulfamethoxazole
- Trimethoprim/sulfamethoxazole
