= C22H31NO3 =

The molecular formula C_{22}H_{31}NO_{3} (molar mass: 357.49 g/mol, exact mass: 357.2304 u) may refer to:

- Epostane
- Oxybutynin
