= C27H44O2 =

The molecular formula C_{27}H_{44}O_{2} may refer to:

- Alfacalcidol
- Calcifediol, or calcidiol
- Colestolone, or 5α-cholest-8(14)-en-3β-ol-15-one
- Gefarnate
- 7α-Hydroxy-4-cholesten-3-one
