= C18H14Cl4N2O =

The molecular formula C_{18}H_{14}Cl_{4}N_{2}O (molar mass: 416.13 g/mol, exact mass: 413.9860 u) may refer to:

- Isoconazole
- Miconazole
