= Metyrapone =

Chemical compound

- Molecular structure of metyrapone

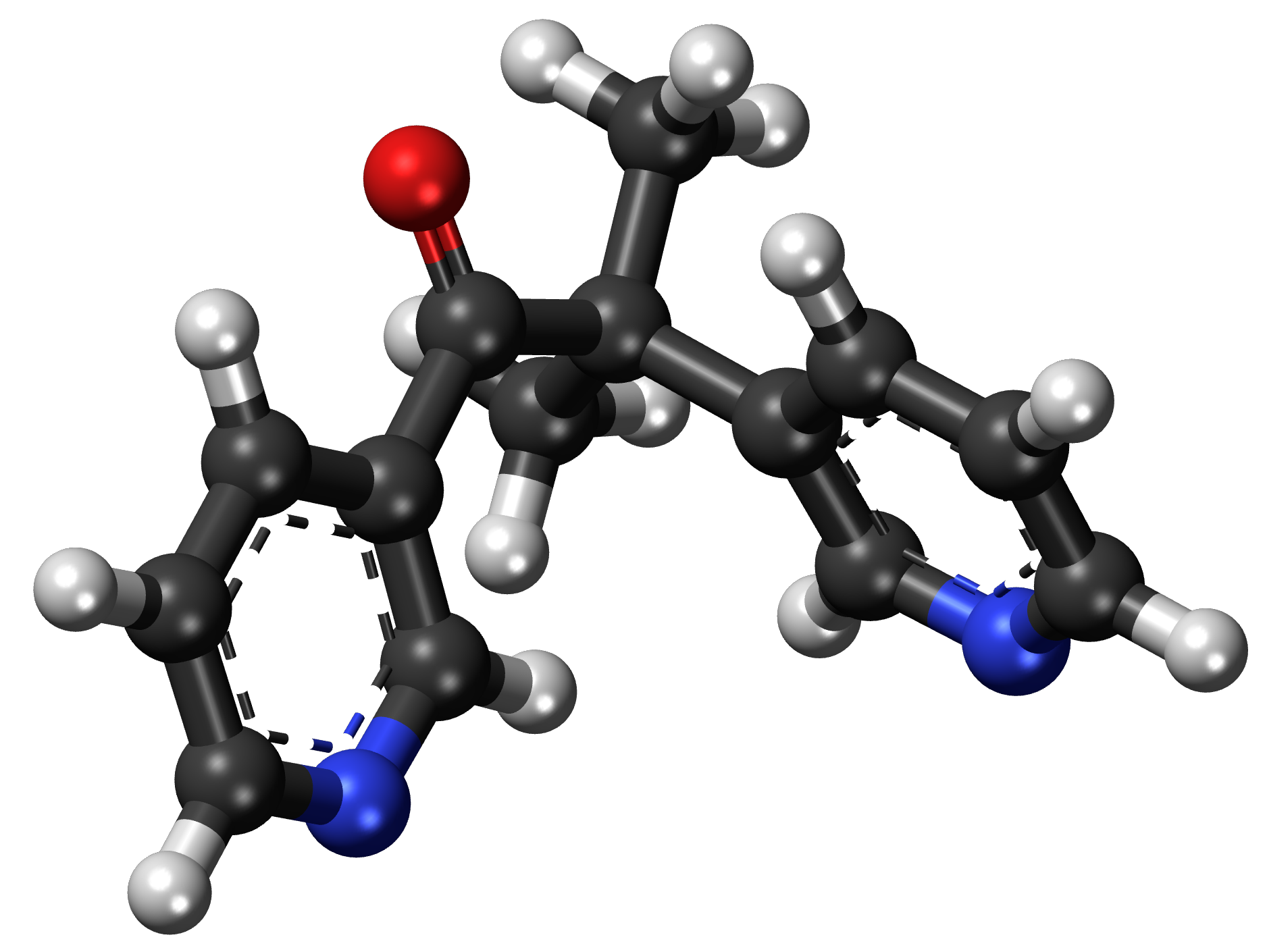
- 3D representation of a metyrapone molecule

Clinical data
- Trade names: Metopirone
- AHFS/Drugs.com: Consumer Drug Information
- Pregnancy category: C US
- Routes of administration: By mouth
- ATC code: V04CD01 (WHO)

Pharmacokinetic data
- Elimination half-life: 1.9 ± 0.7 hours

Identifiers
- IUPAC name: 2-methyl-1,2-di(pyridin-3-yl)propan-1-one
- CAS Number: 54-36-4
- PubChem CID: 4174
- IUPHAR/BPS: 5224
- DrugBank: DB01011
- ChemSpider: 4030
- UNII: ZS9KD92H6V
- KEGG: D00410
- ChEBI: CHEBI:44241
- ChEMBL: ChEMBL934
- CompTox Dashboard (EPA): DTXSID1023314
- ECHA InfoCard: 100.000.188

Chemical and physical data
- Formula: C_{14}H_{14}N_{2}O
- Molar mass: 226.279 g·mol^{−1}
- 3D model (JSmol): Interactive image
- SMILES: O=C(c1cccnc1)C(c2cccnc2)(C)C
- InChI: InChI=1S/C14H14N2O/c1-14(2,12-6-4-8-16-10-12)13(17)11-5-3-7-15-9-11/h3-10H,1-2H3; Key:FJLBFSROUSIWMA-UHFFFAOYSA-N

Metyrapone, sold under the brand name Metopirone, is a medication which is used in the diagnosis of adrenal insufficiency and occasionally in the treatment of Cushing's syndrome (hypercortisolism). It is part of the steroidogenesis inhibitor class of drugs.

== Medical uses ==
Metyrapone can be used in the diagnosis of adrenal insufficiency. Metyrapone 30 mg/kg, maximum dose 3,000 mg, is administered at midnight usually with a snack. The plasma cortisol and 11-deoxycortisol are measured the next morning between 8:00 and 9:00 am. A plasma cortisol less than 220 nmol/L indicates adequate inhibition of 11β-hydroxylase. In patients with intact Hypothalamo-pituitary-adrenal axis, CRH and ACTH levels rise as a response to the falling cortisol levels. This results in an increase of the steroid precursors in the pathway. Therefore, if 11-deoxycortisol levels do not rise and remain less than 7 μg/dL (202 nmol/L) and adrenocorticotropic hormone (ACTH) rises, then it is highly suggestive of adrenal insufficiency. If neither 11-deoxycortisol nor ACTH rise, it is highly suggestive of an impaired hypothalamic–pituitary–adrenal axis at either the pituitary or hypothalamus.

The metyrapone test may aid in verifying the cause of Cushing's syndrome. Most patients with pituitary dysfunction and/or pituitary microadenoma will increase ACTH secretion in response to metyrapone, while most ectopic ACTH-producing tumors will not. Pituitary macroadenomas do not always respond to metyrapone.

Metyrapone is used for the medical control of hypercortisolism in Cushing's syndrome (ACTH dependent or independent). The aim for medical treatment is to achieve pre-operative control of hypercortisolism, or for control of residual disease persisting post-operatively (TSS, adrenalectomy). It is not for long term definitive treatment/cure, only as an adjunct (surgery is the aim for cure in most causes of Cushing's syndrome). Metyrapone hence acts by inhibiting adrenal steroidogenesis. One side effect is hirsutism (in women) because of the excess androgen precursors created. The other commonly used agent for medical treatment of Cushing's is ketoconazole (an anti-fungal agent), though it is not FDA approved for Cushing's. This does not exhibit the side effect of hirsutism, but does carry a high risk of hepatoxicity and other serious side effects. Levoketoconazole, an enantiomeric form of ketoconazole, is FDA approved to treat Cushing's and carries a lower risk of hepatoxicity and other serious side effects compared to ketoconazole.

== Pharmacology ==
=== Pharmacodynamics ===
Metyrapone blocks cortisol steroidogenesis by acting as a reversible inhibitor of 11β-hydroxylase. This stimulates adrenocorticotropic hormone (ACTH) secretion, which in turn increases plasma 11-deoxycortisol levels.

== Chemistry ==
Analogues of metyrapone include aminoglutethimide, amphenone B, and mitotane.

== Research ==
Metyrapone has been found in early human trials to reduce recollection of emotional memories in normal volunteers. The volunteers showed significant impairment in ability to retrieve memories with negative emotional content while not impairing memories with neutral content. This has significant implication in the study of the process of emotional healing in post traumatic stress disorder.

Due to the permissive action of cortisol on glucagon, partial blockade of cortisol may reduce the effects of circulating glucagon in chronically increasing blood glucose in metabolic syndrome (syndrome X) and type 2 diabetes.

== See also ==
- ACTH stimulation test
