= Azalanstat =

Anti-obesity drug

Clinical data
- ATC code: None

Identifiers
- IUPAC name: 4-({[(2S,4S)-2-[2-(4-Chlorophenyl)ethyl]-2-(1H-imidazol-1-ylmethyl)-1,3-dioxolan-4-yl]methyl}sulfanyl)aniline
- CAS Number: 143393-27-5
- PubChem CID: 60876
- ChemSpider: 54858
- UNII: 2NL79NI1WS
- KEGG: D03025
- ChEMBL: ChEMBL70611
- CompTox Dashboard (EPA): DTXSID401029427

Chemical and physical data
- Formula: C_{22}H_{24}ClN_{3}O_{2}S
- Molar mass: 429.96 g·mol^{−1}
- 3D model (JSmol): Interactive image
- SMILES: Clc1ccc(cc1)CC[C@@]2(OC[C@H](O2)CSc3ccc(N)cc3)Cn4ccnc4
- InChI: InChI=1S/C22H24ClN3O2S/c23-18-3-1-17(2-4-18)9-10-22(15-26-12-11-25-16-26)27-13-20(28-22)14-29-21-7-5-19(24)6-8-21/h1-8,11-12,16,20H,9-10,13-15,24H2/t20-,22-/m0/s1; Key:VYNIUBZKEWJOJP-UNMCSNQZSA-N

Azalanstat (INN, codenamed RS-21607) is an anti-obesity drug acting as a lanosterol 14α-demethylase inhibitor.
