= Chemosterilant =

Class of chemical compound

A chemosterilant is a chemical compound that causes reproductive sterility in an organism. Chemosterilants are particularly useful in controlling the population of species that are known to cause disease, such as insects, or species that are, in general, economically damaging. The sterility induced by chemosterilants can have temporary or permanent effects. Chemosterilants can be used to target one or both sexes, and it prevents the organism from advancing to be sexually functional. They may be used to control pest populations by sterilizing males. The need for chemosterilants is a direct consequence of the limitations of insecticides. Insecticides are most effective in regions in which there is high vector density in conjunction with endemic transmission, and this may not always be the case. Additionally, the insects themselves will develop a resistance to the insecticide either on the target protein level or through avoidance of the insecticide in what is called a behavioral resistance. If an insect that has been treated with a chemosterilant mates with a fertile insect, no offspring will be produced. The intention is to keep the percent of sterile insects within a population constant, such that with each generation, there will be fewer offspring.

== Early research and concerns ==
Structure of pyriproxyfen

Research on chemosterilants began in the 1960s–1970s, but the effort was abandoned due to concerns regarding toxicity. However, with great advancements made in genetics and analysis of vectors, the search for safer chemosterilants has resumed in the 21st century. Initially, there were many concerns with using chemosterilants on an operational scale due to difficulties in finding the ideal small molecule. The molecule used as a chemosterilant must satisfy a certain criteria. Firstly, the molecule must be available at a low cost. The molecule must result in permanent sterility upon exposure through topical application or immersion of larvae into water. Additionally, the survivability of the sterile males must not be affected, and the chemosterilant should not be toxic to humans or the environment. The two promising agents in the beginning were aziridines thiotepa and bisazir, but they were unable to satisfy the criteria of minimal toxicity to humans as well as the vector's predators. Pyriproxyfen was another compound of interest since it is not toxic to humans, but it would not be possible to induce sterility in larvae due to the fact that it exists as a larvicide. Exposure of larvae to pyriproxyfen will essentially kill the larvae.

== Examples of chemosterilants ==
=== Use of chemosterilants for non-surgical castration (dogs and cats) ===
There are many regions in which there is a population of cats and dogs that freely roam on the streets. The most conventional approach to controlling reproductive rates in companion animals is through surgical means. However, surgical intervention poses ethical concerns. Through the formulation of a non-surgical castration technique, animals would not have to undergo anesthesia, and would not have to experience post-surgical bleeding or infection of the area that has been operated on. Some examples of chemosterilants include CaCl_{2} and zinc gluconate. These are specifically known as necrosis-inducing agents, which result in the degeneration of cells in the testes, resulting in infertility. These kinds of chemicals are generally injected into male reproductive organs, such as the testes, vas deferens, or epididymis. When injected, they induce azoospermia, which is the degeneration of the sperm cells normally found in the semen. If no sperm cells are present, reproduction can no longer occur. There is, however, one complication that results from the use of necrosis-inducing agents. Many animals generally exhibit an inflammatory response directly after the injection. To avoid the pain and discomfort associated with necrosis-inducing agents, another form of sterilization, known as apoptosis-inducing agents, has been studied. If cells are signaled to perform apoptosis rather than being eliminated by a foreign substance, this will result in no inflammation in the area. Experiments were tested using mice in vitro and ex vivo that have proved this. Using an apoptosis-inducing agent known as doxorubicin encapsulated in a nanoemulsion, and injecting it into mice, testicular cell death was observed. Inflammation was not observed in this case; however, more research still needs to be conducted with these materials, as the long-term impacts are unknown.

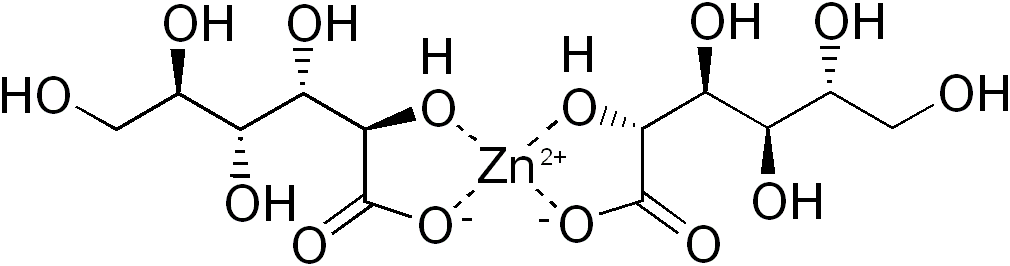
Structure of Zinc Gluconate

==== Effect of chemosterilants on the behavior of wandering male dogs in Puerto Natales, Chile ====
Chemosterilants can be useful to developing countries due to the fact that they have less resources and funds that can be allocated towards castration of their free-roaming animals. Additionally, the culture opposes the removal of testes. This study, performed in 2015, was unable to conclude the effects of chemical sterilization on dog aggression, as not enough is known about the aggression displayed by free-roaming dogs, and thus, researchers were unable to objectively make a decision on this front. Using GPS technology to track the movement of the free-roaming male dogs, it was found that chemical sterilization in comparison to surgical sterilization did not have a significant impact on the range of their roaming around the city. Much more detailed studies need to be performed in this area, since this study was the first of its kind and had relatively short sample sizes along with the examination of behavior not spanning a long enough time period.

=== Use of CaCl_{2} and zinc gluconate in cattle ===
The method of administration of CaCl_{2} and zinc gluconate is through a transvaginal injection of the chemical into the ovaries, and visualization is achieved through the use of an ultrasound. One group of cattle was only treated with CaCl_{2}, one group was only treated with zinc gluconate, and one group was treated with both CaCl_{2} and zinc gluconate. Treatment with CaCl_{2} seems to be most promising, as the ovarian mass of the female cattle upon slaughter was less than cattle treated with zinc gluconate or the combination. The goal of treatment with CaCl_{2} is to cause ovarian atrophy with a minimal amount of pain.

=== Ornitrol in controlling the sparrow population ===
Another chemosterilant found to be effective is known as ornitrol. This chemosterilant was provided to sparrows by impregnating canary seeds, and this was used as a food source for a group of sparrows. There was a control group that was fed canary seeds without the ornitrol, and these birds laid almost twice as many eggs as group that was given ornitrol. It was deemed an effective chemosterilant in the study; however, after the removal of the chemosterilant from the diet, the birds were able to lay viable eggs as soon as 1–2 weeks later.

=== Commonly used chemosterilants ===
Two types of chemosterilants are commonly used:

- Antimetabolites resemble a substance that the cell or tissue needs that the organism's body mistakes for a true metabolite and tries to incorporate them in its normal building processes. The fit of the chemical is not exactly right and the metabolic process comes to a halt.
- Alkylating agents are a group of chemicals that act on chromosomes. These chemicals are extremely reactive, capable of intense cell destruction, damage to chromosomes and production of mutations.

== See also ==
- Sterile insect technique
