= Propiconazole =

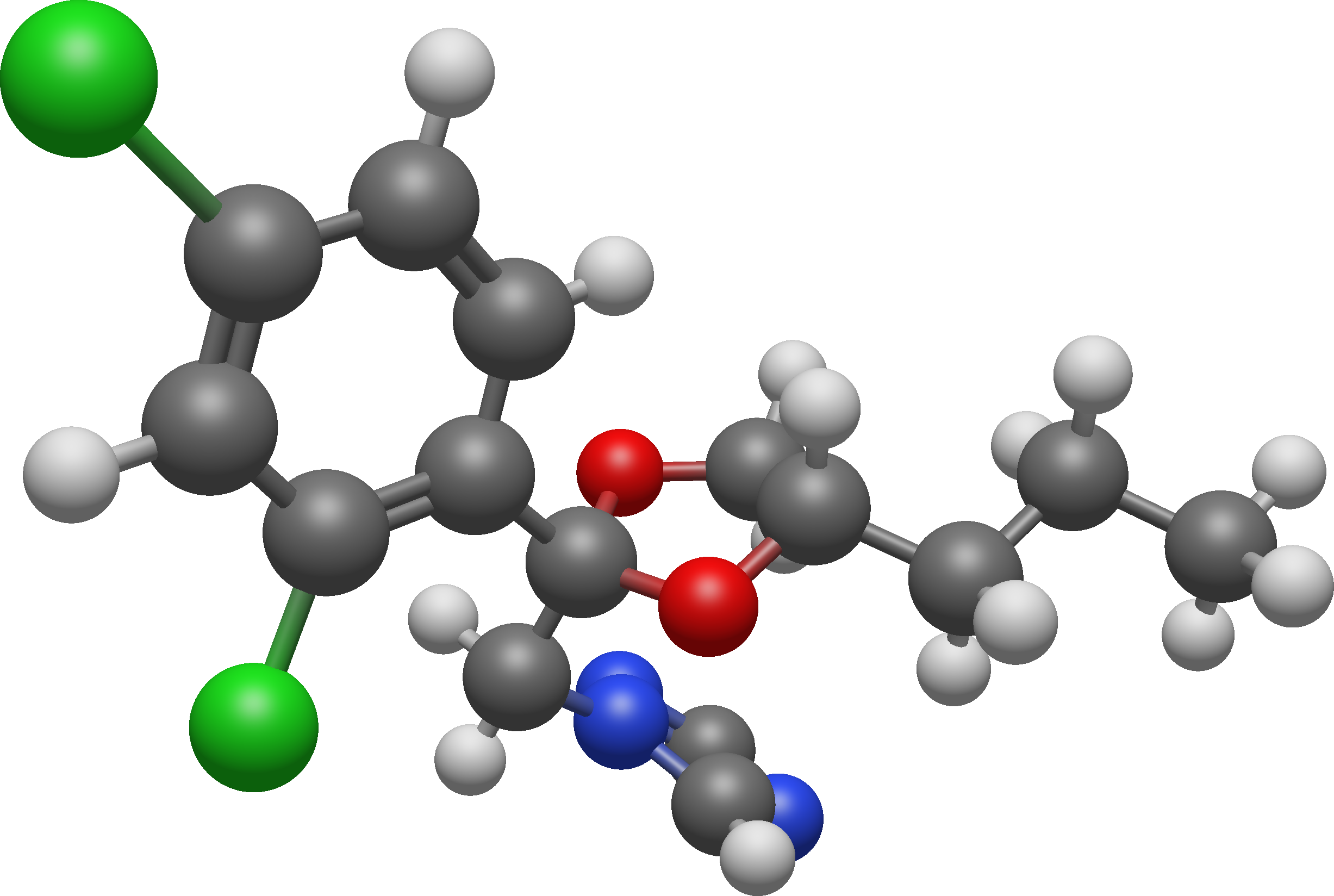

Names
- IUPAC name 1-[ [2-(2,4-dichlorophenyl)-4-propyl-1,3-dioxolan-2-yl]methyl]-1,2,4-triazole

Identifiers
CAS Number	60207-90-1
3D model (JSmol)	Interactive image
ChEBI	CHEBI:8489
ChEMBL	ChEMBL560579
ChemSpider	39402
ECHA InfoCard	100.056.441
KEGG	C11121
PubChem CID	43234
UNII	142KW8TBSR
CompTox Dashboard (EPA)	DTXSID8024280
- InChI: InChI=1S/C15H17Cl2N3O2/c1-2-3-12-7-21-15(22-12,8-20-10-18-9-19-20)13-5-4-11(16)6-14(13)17/h4-6,9-10,12H,2-3,7-8H2,1H3 Key: STJLVHWMYQXCPB-UHFFFAOYSA-N; InChI=1/C15H17Cl2N3O2/c1-2-3-12-7-21-15(22-12,8-20-10-18-9-19-20)13-5-4-11(16)6-14(13)17/h4-6,9-10,12H,2-3,7-8H2,1H3 Key: STJLVHWMYQXCPB-UHFFFAOYAJ
- SMILES: Clc1ccc(c(Cl)c1)C2(OCC(O2)CCC)Cn3ncnc3

Properties
Chemical formula	C_{15}H_{17}Cl_{2}N_{3}O_{2}
Molar mass	342.22038
Boiling point	180 °C (356 °F; 453 K) at 0.1 mmHg
Solubility in water	100 ppm at 20 °C
- Except where otherwise noted, data are given for materials in their standard state (at 25 °C [77 °F], 100 kPa). verify (what is ?) Infobox references

Propiconazole is a triazole fungicide, also known as a DMI, or demethylation inhibiting fungicide due to its binding with and inhibiting the 14-alpha demethylase enzyme from demethylating a precursor to ergosterol. Without this demethylation step, the ergosterols are not incorporated into the growing fungal cell membranes, and cellular growth is stopped.

== Agriculture ==
Propiconazole is used agriculturally as a systemic fungicide on turfgrasses grown for seed and aesthetic or athletic value, wheat, mushrooms, corn, wild rice, peanuts, almonds, sorghum, oats, pecans, apricots, peaches, nectarines, plums, prunes and lemons. It is also used in combination with permethrin in formulations of wood preserver. Propiconazole is a mixture of four stereoisomers and was first developed in 1979 by Janssen Pharmaceutica. Propiconazole exhibits strong anti-feeding properties against the keratin-digesting Australian carpet beetle Anthrenocerus australis.
