= Colestolone =

Chemical compound

Clinical data
- Other names: 5α-Cholest-8(14)-en-3β-ol-15-one; 3β-Hydroxy-5α-cholest-8(14)-en-15-one

Identifiers
- IUPAC name: (3S,5S,10S,13R,17R)-3-Hydroxy-10,13-dimethyl-17-(6-methylheptan-2-yl)-1,2,3,4,5,6,7,9,11,12,16,17-dodecahydrocyclopenta[a]phenanthren-15-one
- CAS Number: 50673-97-7
- PubChem CID: 39756
- ChemSpider: 39756
- UNII: 5P8396T5XF
- CompTox Dashboard (EPA): DTXSID6046212

Chemical and physical data
- Formula: C_{27}H_{44}O_{2}
- Molar mass: 400.647 g·mol^{−1}
- 3D model (JSmol): Interactive image
- SMILES: CC(C)CCCC(C)[C@H]1CC(=O)C2=C3CC[C@H]4C[C@H](CC[C@@]4(C3CC[C@]12C)C)O
- InChI: InChI=1S/C27H44O2/c1-17(2)7-6-8-18(3)23-16-24(29)25-21-10-9-19-15-20(28)11-13-26(19,4)22(21)12-14-27(23,25)5/h17-20,22-23,28H,6-16H2,1-5H3/t18?,19-,20-,22?,23+,26-,27+/m0/s1; Key:LINVVMHRTUSXHL-NDNSGUFDSA-N

Colestolone (INN, USAN), also known as 5α-cholest-8(14)-en-3β-ol-15-one, is a potent inhibitor of sterol biosynthesis which is described as a hypocholesterolemic (lipid-lowering) agent. It was first reported in 1977 and was studied until at least 1988, but was never introduced for medical use.

Colestolone has been found to significantly reduce serum levels of cholesterol both in animals and in humans. It inhibits multiple relatively early-stage steps in cholesterol biosynthesis such as HMG-CoA reductase and does not appear to affect any late-stage steps (after squalene, specifically). Unlike late-stage cholesterol biosynthesis inhibitors like triparanol and azacosterol, no accumulation of sterols has been observed in animals treated with colestolone, suggesting that it does not share the toxicity of late-stage cholesterol biosynthesis inhibitors.

In addition to its potent inhibition of cholesterol biosynthesis, it is notable that colestolone also happens to serve as a precursor of cholesterol, and is efficiently converted into it in rat liver homogenates and upon oral administration to rats.
