= Croconazole =

Chemical compound

Clinical data
- AHFS/Drugs.com: International Drug Names
- Routes of administration: Topical
- ATC code: None

Legal status
- Legal status: In general: ℞ (Prescription only)

Identifiers
- IUPAC name: 1-(1-{2-[(3-chlorophenyl)methoxy]phenyl}ethenyl)-1H-imidazole
- CAS Number: 77175-51-0
- PubChem CID: 2880
- ChemSpider: 2777
- UNII: 446254H55G
- KEGG: D07752
- ChEMBL: ChEMBL27289
- CompTox Dashboard (EPA): DTXSID6058475

Chemical and physical data
- Formula: C_{18}H_{15}ClN_{2}O
- Molar mass: 310.78 g·mol^{−1}
- 3D model (JSmol): Interactive image
- SMILES: Clc1cccc(c1)COc3c(\C(=C)n2ccnc2)cccc3

Croconazole (INN) is an imidazole antifungal.
