= Liarozole =

Names
- Preferred IUPAC name 6-[(3-Chlorophenyl)(1H-imidazol-1-yl)methyl]-1H-1,3-benzimidazole

Identifiers
CAS Number	115575-11-6
3D model (JSmol)	Interactive image
ChemSpider	54664
IUPHAR/BPS	5210
PubChem CID	60652
UNII	K0Q29TGV9Y
CompTox Dashboard (EPA)	DTXSID9048277
- InChI: InChI=1S/C17H13ClN4/c18-14-3-1-2-12(8-14)17(22-7-6-19-11-22)13-4-5-15-16(9-13)21-10-20-15/h1-11,17H,(H,20,21) Key: UGFHIPBXIWJXNA-UHFFFAOYSA-N; InChI=1/C17H13ClN4/c18-14-3-1-2-12(8-14)17(22-7-6-19-11-22)13-4-5-15-16(9-13)21-10-20-15/h1-11,17H,(H,20,21) Key: UGFHIPBXIWJXNA-UHFFFAOYAV
- SMILES: C1=CC(=CC(=C1)Cl)C(C2=CC3=C(C=C2)N=CN3)N4C=CN=C4

Properties
Chemical formula	C_{17}H_{13}ClN_{4}
Molar mass	308.77 g·mol^{−1}
- Except where otherwise noted, data are given for materials in their standard state (at 25 °C [77 °F], 100 kPa). Infobox references

Liarozole is a retinoic acid metabolism-blocking drug and aromatase inhibitor. Liarozole is a structural isomer of alprazolam, but the two compounds are completely unrelated.
