= Epostane =

Chemical compound

Clinical data
- Other names: WIN-32729

Identifiers
- IUPAC name: 4α,5α-Epoxy-3,17β-dihydroxy-4β,17α-dimethylandrost-2-ene-2-carbonitrile
- CAS Number: 80471-63-2
- PubChem CID: 6917713
- ChemSpider: 5292942
- UNII: 6375T36951
- ChEMBL: ChEMBL2106218
- CompTox Dashboard (EPA): DTXSID001001267

Chemical and physical data
- Formula: C_{22}H_{31}NO_{3}
- Molar mass: 357.494 g·mol^{−1}
- 3D model (JSmol): Interactive image
- SMILES: C[C@]12CC[C@H]3[C@H]([C@@H]1CC[C@]2(C)O)CC[C@]45[C@@]3(CC(=C([C@]4(O5)C)O)C#N)C
- InChI: InChI=1S/C22H31NO3/c1-18-8-6-16-14(15(18)7-9-20(18,3)25)5-10-22-19(16,2)11-13(12-23)17(24)21(22,4)26-22/h14-16,24-25H,5-11H2,1-4H3/t14-,15-,16-,18-,19+,20-,21+,22-/m0/s1; Key:CETKWEWBSMKADK-GSXVSZIWSA-N

Epostane (INN, USAN, BAN) (developmental code name WIN-32729) is an inhibitor of 3β-hydroxysteroid dehydrogenase (3β-HSD) that was developed as a contraceptive, abortifacient, and oxytocic drug but was never marketed. By inhibiting 3β-HSD, epostane blocks the biosynthesis of progesterone from pregnenolone (and also the conversion of dehydroepiandrosterone to androstenedione), thereby functioning as an antiprogestogen and terminating pregnancy. The drug was trialed and in a study was found to be slightly more effective at inducing abortion relative to mifepristone.

== See also ==
- Nisterime
- Trilostane
