= Mitotane =

Chemical compound

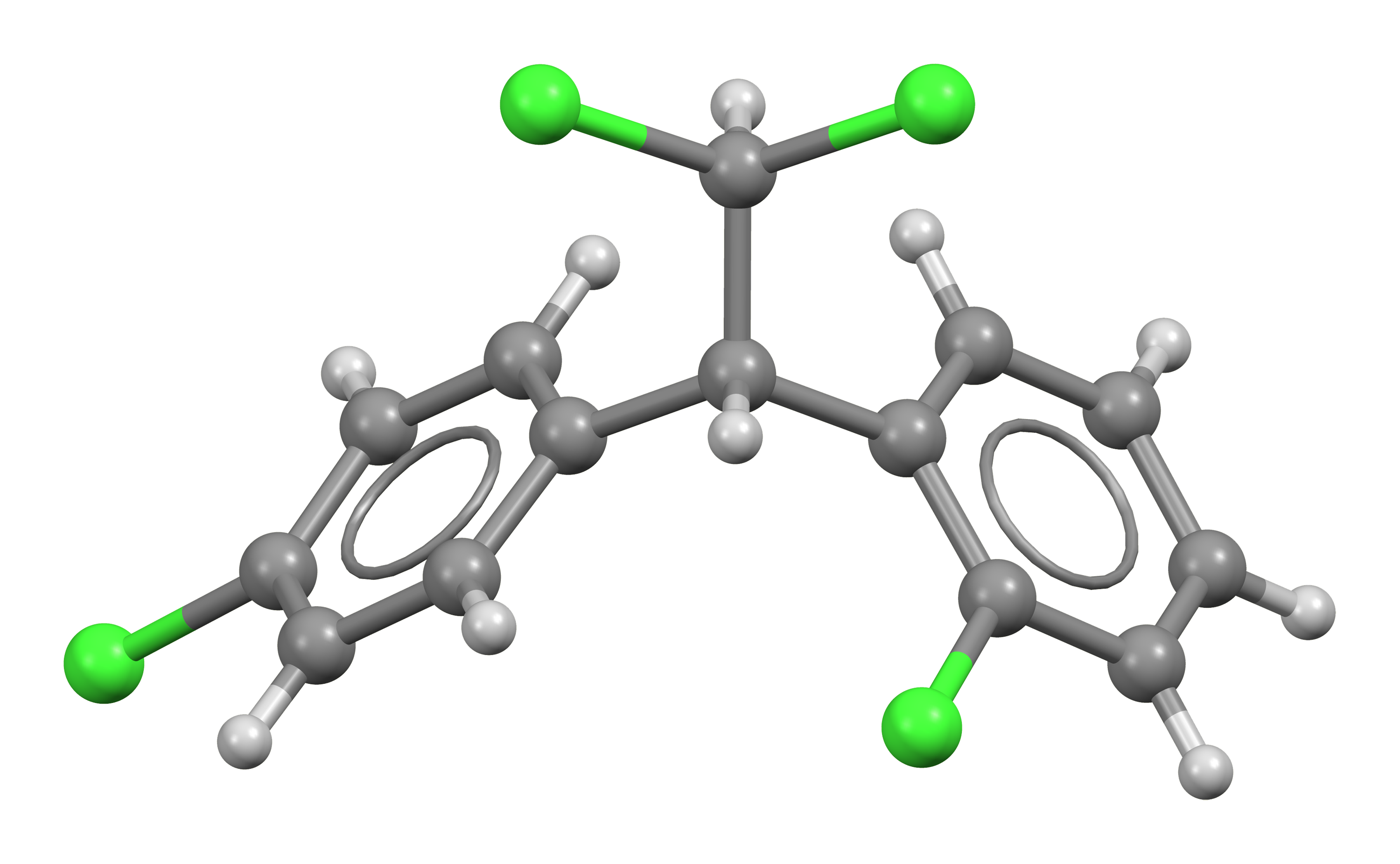

Clinical data
- Trade names: Lysodren
- Other names: 1,1-(Dichlorodiphenyl)-2,2-dichloroethane; o,p'-DDD
- AHFS/Drugs.com: Monograph
- MedlinePlus: a608050
- License data: US DailyMed: Mitotane
- Routes of administration: By mouth
- ATC code: L01XX23 (WHO)

Legal status
- Legal status: CA: ℞-only; EU: Rx-only; In general: ℞ (Prescription only)

Pharmacokinetic data
- Bioavailability: 40%
- Protein binding: 6%
- Elimination half-life: 18–159 days

Identifiers
- IUPAC name: (RS)-1-chloro-2-[2,2-dichloro-1-(4-chlorophenyl)-ethyl]-benzene
- CAS Number: 53-19-0
- PubChem CID: 4211
- IUPHAR/BPS: 6957
- DrugBank: DB00648
- ChemSpider: 4066
- UNII: 78E4J5IB5J
- KEGG: D00420
- ChEMBL: ChEMBL1670
- CompTox Dashboard (EPA): DTXSID9020372
- ECHA InfoCard: 100.000.152

Chemical and physical data
- Formula: C_{14}H_{10}Cl_{4}
- Molar mass: 320.03 g·mol^{−1}
- 3D model (JSmol): Interactive image
- Chirality: Racemic mixture
- Melting point: 76 to 78 °C (169 to 172 °F)
- SMILES: Clc1ccccc1C(c2ccc(Cl)cc2)C(Cl)Cl
- InChI: InChI=1S/C14H10Cl4/c15-10-7-5-9(6-8-10)13(14(17)18)11-3-1-2-4-12(11)16/h1-8,13-14H; Key:JWBOIMRXGHLCPP-UHFFFAOYSA-N

Mitotane, sold under the brand name Lysodren, is a steroidogenesis inhibitor and cytostatic antineoplastic medication which is used in the treatment of adrenocortical carcinoma and Cushing's syndrome. It is a derivative of the early insecticide DDT and an isomer of p,p'-DDD (4,4'-dichlorodiphenyldichloroethane) and is also known as 2,4'-(dichlorodiphenyl)-2,2-dichloroethane (o,p'-DDD).

== Medical uses ==
Mitotane has been produced by Bristol Myers Squibb but it is marketed as an orphan drug for adrenocortical carcinoma due to the small number of patients in need of it. Its main use is in those patients who have persistent disease despite surgical resection, those who are not surgical candidates, or those who have metastatic disease. In a 2007 retrospective study of 177 patients from 1985 to 2005 showed a significant increase in the recurrence-free interval after radical surgery followed by mitotane when compared to surgery alone. The drug is also sometimes used in the treatment of Cushing's syndrome.

Therapy with mitotane is initiated using an escalating regimen. The extent or intensity of the therapy is gradually increased. This depends on how well the individual patient tolerates the drug and the extent to which it affects the patient's performance status (according to the ECOG/Karnofsky Performance Status). Monitoring of the mitotane concentration in the blood is recommended. The general target value is 14-20 mg/L.

Mitotane therapy is initiated using an escalating regimen. In all patients receiving mitotane therapy, glucocorticoid replacement is recommended, except for patients with persistent cortisol excess. In these cases, at least twice the standard replacement dose is generally required. This is due to the increased steroid excretion and the rise in cortisol-binding globulin. Mitotane-induced side effects must be monitored regularly and treated appropriately, avoiding over-, under-, or inappropriate treatment. Furthermore, initiating supportive therapy is advisable to improve mitotane tolerance. Ideally, this should be done before severe toxicity develops. Mitotane causes significant drug interactions due to strong induction of CYP3A4. Therefore, it is crucial to check all concomitant medications for CYP3A4 interactions and replace them with an alternative if necessary and available. Other healthcare providers should be advised not to initiate any other drug therapies without prior consultation.

== Side effects ==
The use of mitotane is unfortunately limited by side effects, which, as reported by Schteingart et al., include anorexia and nausea (88%), diarrhea (38%), vomiting (23%), decreased memory and ability to concentrate (50%), rash (23%), gynecomastia (50%), arthralgia (19%), and leukopenia (7%).

== Pharmacology ==
=== Pharmacodynamics ===
Mitotane is an inhibitor of the adrenal cortex. It acts as an inhibitor of cholesterol side-chain cleavage enzyme (P450scc, CYP11A1), and also of 11β-hydroxylase (CYP11B1), 18-hydroxylase (aldosterone synthase, CYP11B2), and 3β-hydroxysteroid dehydrogenase (3β-HSD) to a lesser extent. In addition, mitotane has direct and selective cytotoxic effects on the adrenal cortex, via an unknown mechanism, and thereby induces permanent adrenal atrophy similarly to DDD. Mitotane has also been reported to interact with tubulin and inhibit its polymerization.

== Chemistry ==
Analogues of mitotane include aminoglutethimide, amphenone B, and metyrapone.

== History ==
Mitotane was introduced in 1960 for the treatment of adrenocortical carcinoma.

== Society and culture ==
=== Generic names ===
Mitotane is the generic name of the medication and its INN, USAN, BAN, and JAN.

=== Brand names ===
Mitotane is sold under the brand name Lysodren.

== Veterinary use ==
Mitotane is also used to treat Cushing's disease (pituitary-dependent Cushing's syndrome) in dogs. The medication is used in the controlled destruction of adrenal tissue, leading to a decrease in cortisol production.
