= Dichlorodiphenyldichloroethane =

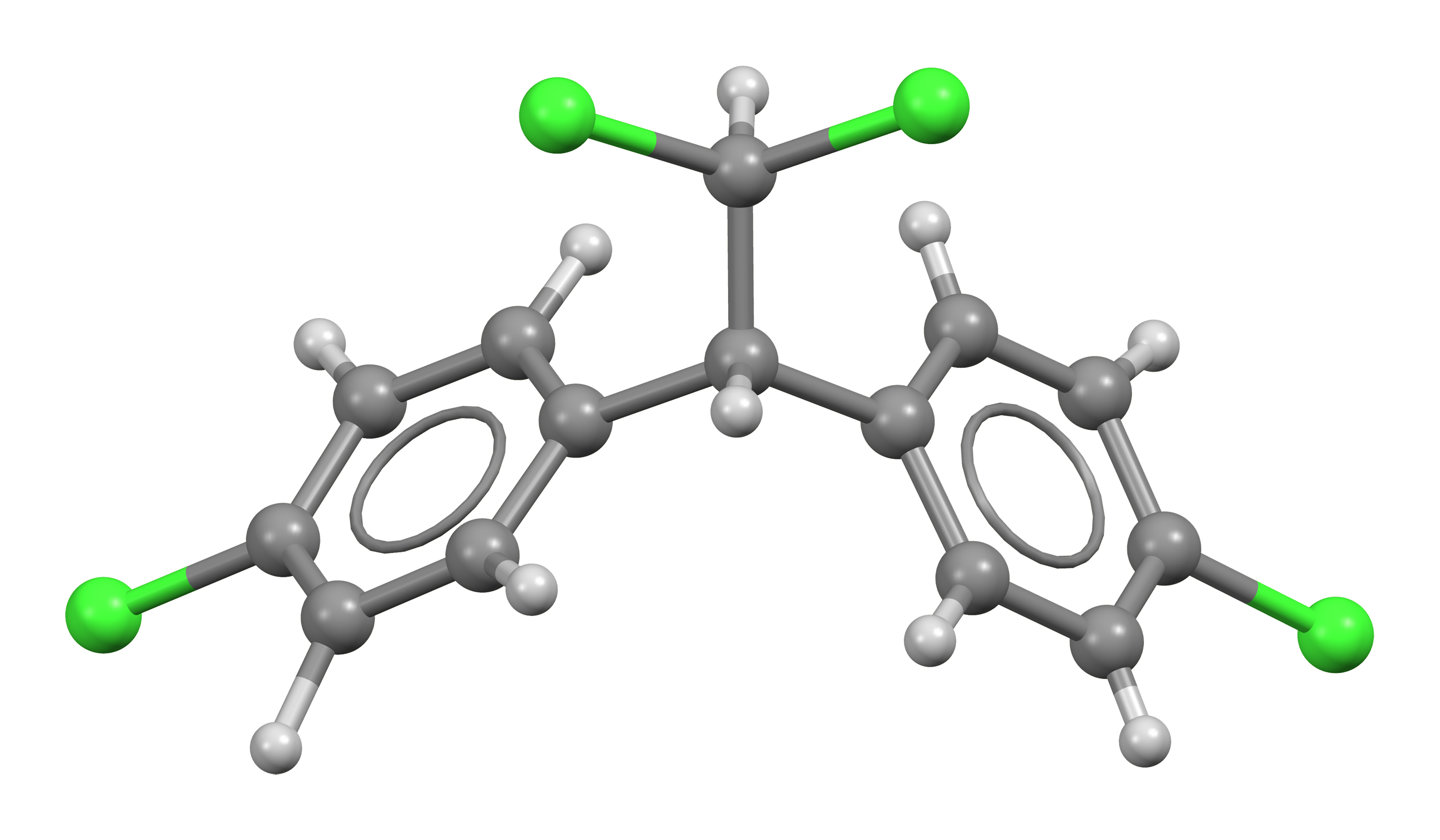

Names
- IUPAC name 1-chloro-4-[2,2-dichloro-1-(4-chlorophenyl)ethyl]benzene
- Preferred IUPAC name 1,1′-(2,2-dichloroethane-1,1-diyl)bis(4-chlorobenzene)

Identifiers
CAS Number	72-54-8
3D model (JSmol)	Interactive image
Abbreviations	DDD
Beilstein Reference	4-05-00-01884
ChEBI	CHEBI:27841
ChEMBL	ChEMBL196590
ChemSpider	6057
ECHA InfoCard	100.000.712
EC Number	200-783-0
KEGG	C06636
MeSH	DDD
PubChem CID	6294
UNII	V14159DF29
CompTox Dashboard (EPA)	DTXSID4020373
- InChI: InChI=1S/C14H10Cl4/c15-11-5-1-9(2-6-11)13(14(17)18)10-3-7-12(16)8-4-10/h1-8,13-14H Key: AHJKRLASYNVKDZ-UHFFFAOYSA-N; InChI=1/C14H10Cl4/c15-11-5-1-9(2-6-11)13(14(17)18)10-3-7-12(16)8-4-10/h1-8,13-14H Key: AHJKRLASYNVKDZ-UHFFFAOYAJ
- SMILES: Clc1ccc(cc1)C(c2ccc(Cl)cc2)C(Cl)Cl

Properties
Chemical formula	C_{14}H_{10}Cl_{4}
Molar mass	320.03 g·mol^{−1}
Appearance	Colorless and crystalline
Density	1.476 g/cm^{3}
Melting point	109.5 °C (229.1 °F; 382.6 K)
Boiling point	350 °C (662 °F; 623 K)
Solubility in water	0.09 mg/L
log P	6.02 (octanol-water)
Vapor pressure	1.35×10^{−6} mm Hg
Henry's law constant (k_{H})	6.6×10^{−6} atm ∙ m^{3}/mol
Atmospheric OH rate constant	4.34×10^{−12} cm^{3}/molecule ∙ s

Related compounds
Related compounds	DDE, DDT, mitotane, perthane
- Except where otherwise noted, data are given for materials in their standard state (at 25 °C [77 °F], 100 kPa). verify (what is ?) Infobox references

Dichlorodiphenyldichloroethane (DDD) is an organochlorine insecticide that is slightly irritating to the skin. DDD is a metabolite of DDT. DDD is colorless and crystalline; it is closely related chemically and is similar in properties to DDT, but it is considered to be less toxic to animals than DDT. The molecular formula for DDD is (ClC_{6}H_{4})_{2}CHCHCl_{2} or C_{14}H_{10}Cl_{4}, whereas the formula for DDT is (ClC_{6}H_{4})_{2}CHCCl_{3} or C_{14}H_{9}Cl_{5}.

DDD is in the “Group B2” classification, meaning that it is a probable human carcinogen. This is based on an increased incidence of lung tumors in male and female mice, liver tumors in male mice, and thyroid tumors in male rats. A further basis is that DDD is similar to and is a metabolite of DDT, another probable human carcinogen.

DDD is no longer registered for agricultural use in the United States, but the general population continues to be exposed to it due to its long persistence time. The primary source of exposure is oral ingestion of food.

1946 is the date of the earliest recorded use in English of the abbreviation “DDD” to stand for dichlorodiphenyldichloroethane, as far as could be determined.

Reductive dechlorination of DDT to form DDD

== Mitotane ==

If one of the p-chlorines in DDD is switched to ortho-position, the result is the chemotherapeutic agent mitotane. This is an example of a positional isomer.

== Table of names ==
The following are synonyms for DDD:

Systematic Names	Superlist Names	Other Names
Benzene, 1,1'-(2,2- dichloroethylidene) bis(4-chloro- (9CI)	4,4'-DDD	1,1'-(2,2-Dichloroethylidene)bis (4-chlorobenzene)
Ethane, 1,1- dichloro-2,2-bis(p- chlorophenyl)-	Benzene, 1,1'-(2,2- dichloroethylidene)bis(4-chloro-	1,1-Bis(4-chlorophenyl)-2,2- dichloroethane
TDE	DDD	1,1-Bis(p-chlorophenyl)-2,2- dichloroethane
p,p'-TDE	DDD, p,p'-	1,1-Dichloor-2,2-bis(4-chloor fenyl)-ethaan (Dutch)
	Dichlorodiphenyldichloroethane	1,1-Dichlor-2,2-bis(4-chlor- phenyl)-aethan (German)
	RCRA waste number U060	1,1-Dichloro-2,2-bis(4- chlorophenyl)-ethane (French)
	TDE	1,1-Dichloro-2,2-bis(4- chlorophenyl)ethane
	Tetrachlorodiphenylethane	1,1-Dichloro-2,2-bis(p- chlorophenyl)ethane
	p,p'-TDE	1,1-Dichloro-2,2-bis (parachlorophenyl)ethane
		1,1-Dichloro-2,2-di(4- chlorophenyl)ethane
		1,1-Dicloro-2,2-bis(4-cloro-fenil)- etano (Italian)
		2,2-Bis(4-chlorophenyl)-1,1- dichloroethane
		2,2-Bis(p-chlorophenyl)-1,1- dichloroethane
		4,4' DDD
		4,4-DDD
		4,4'- Dichlorodiphenyldichloroethane
		4-05-00-01884 (Beilstein Handbook Reference)
		AI3-04225
		Benzene, 1,1'-(2,2- dichloroethylidene)bis[4-chloro-
		BRN 1914072
		CCRIS 573
		Caswell No. 307
		DDD analogue
		DDD in whole water sample
		Dichlorodiphenyl dichloroethane
		Dichlorodiphenyldichlorethane
		Dilene
		EINECS 200-783-0
		ENT 4,225
		EPA Pesticide Chemical Code 029101
		Ethane, 1,1-dichloro-2,2-bis(p- chlorophenyl)-
		HEPT
		HSDB 285
		ME-1700
		Me-700
		NCI-C00475
		NSC 8941
		OMS 1078
		para-para DDD
		para,para'-DDD
		para,para'- Dichlorodiphenyldichloroethane
		p,p-DDD
		p,p'-DDD
		p,p'-Dichlorodiphenyl-2,2-dichloroethylene
		p,p'-Dichlorodiphenyldichloroethane
		Rhothane
		Rhothane D-3
		Rothane
		Rothane WP-50
