= Levoketoconazole =

Chemical compound

- Skeletal structure of (2S,4R)-(−)-ketoconazole (levoketoconazole)

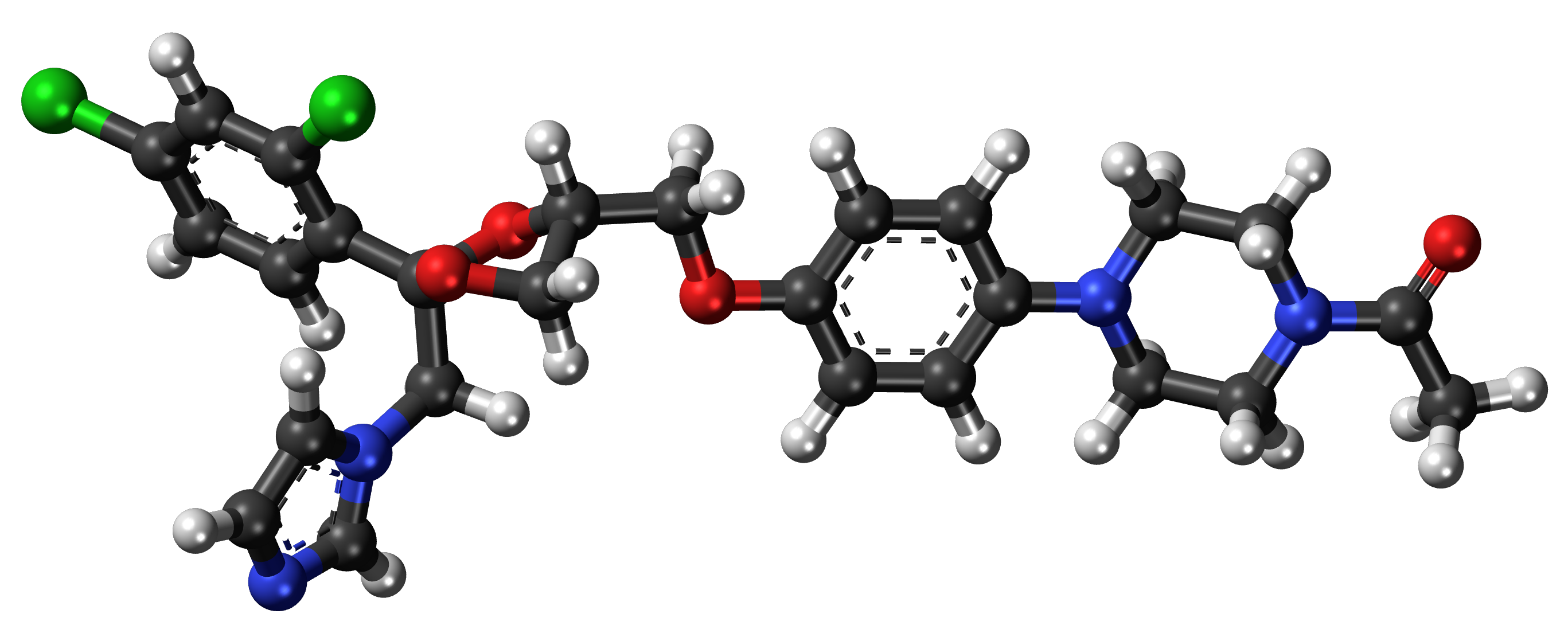
- 3D representation of a levoketoconazole molecule

Clinical data
- Trade names: Recorlev
- Other names: COR-003; (2S,4R)-ketoconazole; NormoCort
- License data: US DailyMed: Levoketoconazole
- Routes of administration: By mouth
- ATC code: H02CA04 (WHO)

Legal status
- Legal status: US: ℞-only

Identifiers
- IUPAC name: 1-[4-(4-{[(2S,4R)-2-(2,4-Dichlorophenyl)-2-(1H-imidazol-1-ylmethyl)-1,3-dioxolan-4-yl]methoxy}phenyl)-1-piperazinyl]ethanone
- CAS Number: 142128-57-2
- PubChem CID: 47576
- DrugBank: DB05667
- ChemSpider: 43284
- UNII: 2DJ8R0NT7K
- KEGG: D10950
- ChEBI: CHEBI:47518
- ChEMBL: ChEMBL295698
- PDB ligand: KLN (PDBe, RCSB PDB)
- CompTox Dashboard (EPA): DTXSID60161949

Chemical and physical data
- Formula: C_{26}H_{28}Cl_{2}N_{4}O_{4}
- Molar mass: 531.43 g·mol^{−1}
- 3D model (JSmol): Interactive image
- SMILES: CC(=O)N1CCN(CC1)c2ccc(cc2)OC[C@@H]3CO[C@@](O3)(Cn4ccnc4)c5ccc(cc5Cl)Cl
- InChI: InChI=1S/C26H28Cl2N4O4/c1-19(33)31-10-12-32(13-11-31)21-3-5-22(6-4-21)34-15-23-16-35-26(36-23,17-30-9-8-29-18-30)24-7-2-20(27)14-25(24)28/h2-9,14,18,23H,10-13,15-17H2,1H3/t23-,26-/m1/s1; Key:XMAYWYJOQHXEEK-ZEQKJWHPSA-N

Levoketoconazole, sold under the brand name Recorlev, is a steroidogenesis inhibitor that is used for the treatment of Cushing's syndrome. Levoketoconazole was approved for medical use in the United States in December 2021.

Levoketoconazole is the levorotatory or (2S,4R) enantiomer of ketoconazole, and it is an inhibitor of the enzymes CYP11B1 (11β-hydroxylase), CYP17A1 (17α-hydroxylase/17,20-lyase), and CYP21A2 (21-hydroxylase). It inhibits glucocorticoid biosynthesis and hence circulating levels of glucocorticoids, thereby treating Cushing's syndrome. In addition to its increased potency, the drug is 12-fold less potent than racemic ketoconazole in inhibiting CYP7A1 (cholesterol 7α-hydroxylase), theoretically resulting in further reduced interference with bile acid production and metabolite elimination and therefore less risk of hepatotoxicity. Levoketoconazole has also been found to inhibit CYP11A1 (cholesterol side-chain cleavage enzyme) and CYP51A1 (lanosterol-14α-demethylase), similarly but more potently relative to ketoconazole.

== Research ==
In a systematic review of levoketoconazole, published in 2024, it was found to be effective in the management of Cushing Syndrome.
