= Orteronel =

Names
- IUPAC name 6-(7-Hydroxy-6,7-dihydro-5H-pyrrolo[1,2-c]imidazol-7-yl)-N-methylnaphthalene-2-carboxamide
- Other names TAK-700

Identifiers
CAS Number	566939-85-3
3D model (JSmol)	Interactive image
ChEBI	CHEBI:231353
ChEMBL	ChEMBL1921976
ChemSpider	8058704
KEGG	D10146
PubChem CID	9883029
UNII	UE5K2FNS92
- InChI: InChI=1S/C18H17N3O2/c1-19-17(22)14-3-2-13-9-15(5-4-12(13)8-14)18(23)6-7-21-11-20-10-16(18)21/h2-5,8-11,23H,6-7H2,1H3,(H,19,22)
- SMILES: O=C(NC)c2ccc1cc(ccc1c2)C4(O)c3cncn3CC4

Properties
Chemical formula	C_{18}H_{17}N_{3}O_{2}
Molar mass	307.353 g·mol^{−1}
- Except where otherwise noted, data are given for materials in their standard state (at 25 °C [77 °F], 100 kPa). Infobox references

Orteronel (TAK-700) is a nonsteroidal CYP17A1 inhibitor that was being developed for the treatment of cancer by Takeda Pharmaceutical Company in conjunction with Millennium Pharmaceuticals. It completed two phase III clinical trials for metastatic, hormone-refractory prostate cancer but failed to extend overall survival rates, and development was voluntarily terminated as a result.

Orteronel is an androgen biosynthesis inhibitor. It selectively inhibits the enzyme CYP17A1 which is expressed in testicular, adrenal, and prostatic tumor tissues. CYP17 catalyzes two sequential reactions: (a) the conversion of pregnenolone and progesterone to their 17α-hydroxy derivatives by its 17α-hydroxylase activity, and (b) the subsequent formation of dehydroepiandrosterone (DHEA) and androstenedione, respectively, by its 17,20-lyase activity. DHEA and androstenedione are androgens and precursors of testosterone. Inhibition of CYP17 activity thus decreases circulating levels of testosterone.
