= Fosfluconazole =

Chemical compound

Clinical data
- AHFS/Drugs.com: International Drug Names
- Routes of administration: IV
- ATC code: none

Legal status
- Legal status: In general: ℞ (Prescription only)

Identifiers
- IUPAC name: {[2-(2,4-Difluorophenyl)-1,3-bis(1H-1,2,4-triazol-1-yl)propan-2-yl]oxy}phosphonic acid
- CAS Number: 194798-83-9
- PubChem CID: 214356
- ChemSpider: 185843
- UNII: 3JIJ299EWH
- ChEMBL: ChEMBL1908301
- CompTox Dashboard (EPA): DTXSID3048601
- ECHA InfoCard: 100.441.524

Chemical and physical data
- Formula: C_{13}H_{13}F_{2}N_{6}O_{4}P
- Molar mass: 386.256 g·mol^{−1}
- 3D model (JSmol): Interactive image
- SMILES: Fc1ccc(c(F)c1)C(OP(=O)(O)O)(Cn2ncnc2)Cn3ncnc3
- InChI: InChI=1S/C13H13F2N6O4P/c14-10-1-2-11(12(15)3-10)13(25-26(22,23)24,4-20-8-16-6-18-20)5-21-9-17-7-19-21/h1-3,6-9H,4-5H2,(H2,22,23,24); Key:GHJWNRRCRIGGIO-UHFFFAOYSA-N

Fosfluconazole (INN) is a water-soluble phosphate prodrug of fluconazole — a triazole antifungal drug used in the treatment and prevention of superficial and systemic fungal infections.

The phosphate ester bond is hydrolyzed by the action of a phosphatase — an enzyme that removes a phosphate group from its substrate by hydrolyzing phosphoric acid monoesters into a phosphate ion and a molecule with a free hydroxyl group (dephosphorylation).
