= Isoconazole =

Chemical compound

Clinical data
- AHFS/Drugs.com: International Drug Names
- ATC code: D01AC05 (WHO) G01AF07 (WHO)

Identifiers
- IUPAC name: (RS)-1-[2-[(2,6-Dichlorobenzyl)oxy]-2-(2,4-dichlorophenyl)ethyl]-1H-imidazole
- CAS Number: 27523-40-6
- PubChem CID: 3760
- DrugBank: DB08943
- ChemSpider: 3629
- UNII: GRI7WFR424
- KEGG: D04624
- ChEBI: CHEBI:82865
- ChEMBL: ChEMBL1571863
- CompTox Dashboard (EPA): DTXSID7045447
- ECHA InfoCard: 100.044.084

Chemical and physical data
- Formula: C_{18}H_{14}Cl_{4}N_{2}O
- Molar mass: 416.12 g·mol^{−1}
- 3D model (JSmol): Interactive image
- SMILES: Clc1ccc(c(Cl)c1)C(OCc2c(Cl)cccc2Cl)Cn3ccnc3

Isoconazole is an azole antifungal drug and could inhibit gram positive bacteria. For foot and vaginal infections, isoconazole has a similar effectiveness to clotrimazole. Isoconazole nitrate may be used in combination with corticosteroid diflucortolone to increase its bioavailability.

It was patented in 1968 and approved for medical use in 1979.

Isoconazole is also known to bind to tubulin and inhibit its polymerization.
