= Azacosterol =

Chemical compound

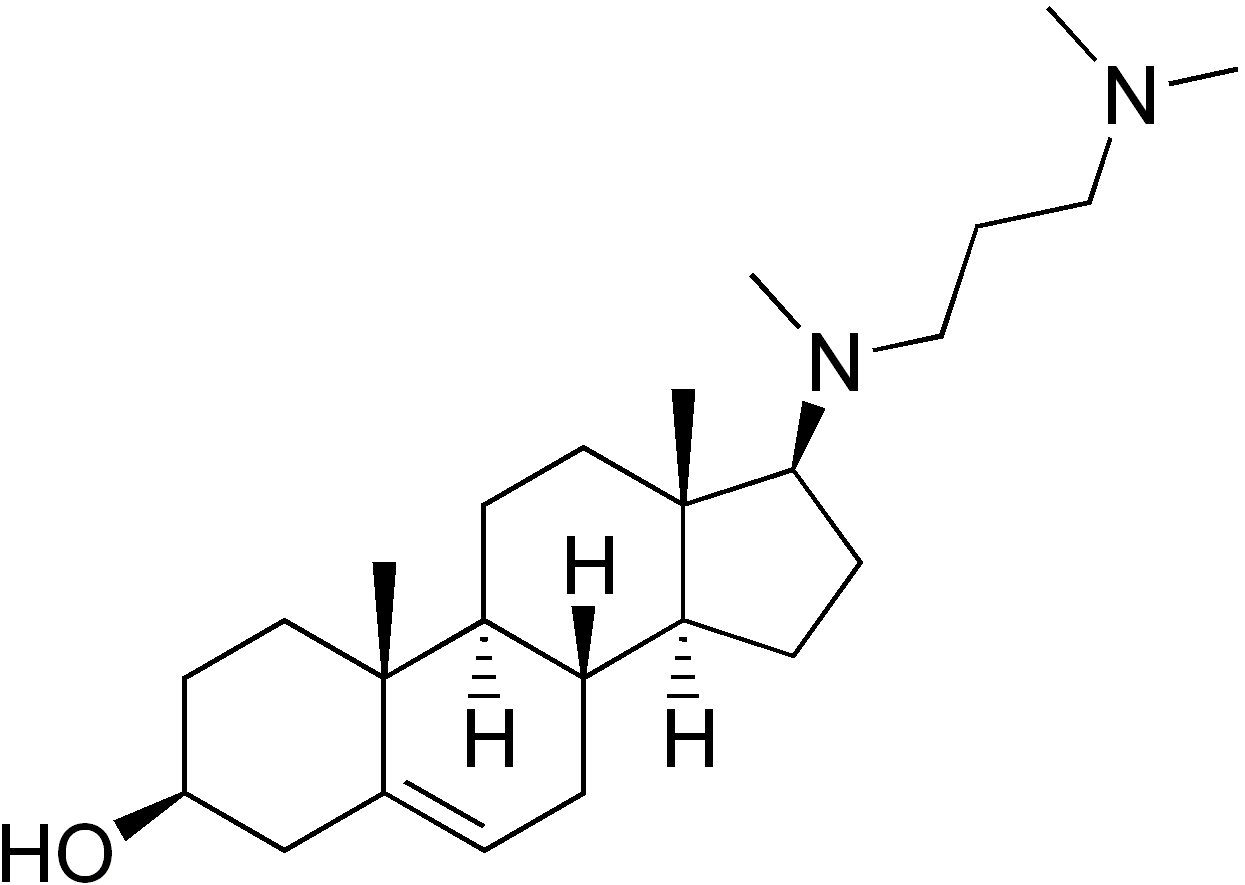

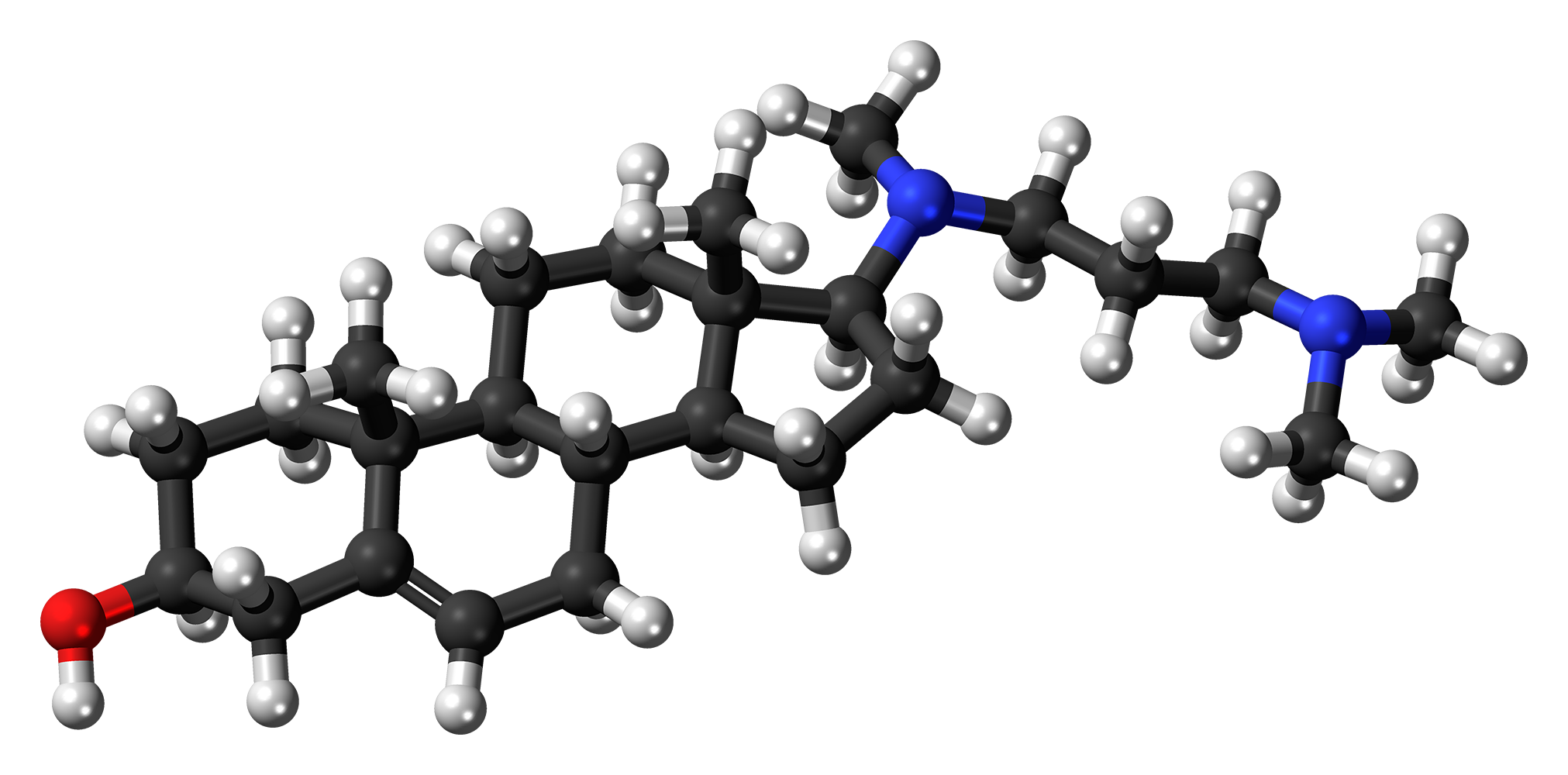

Clinical data
- Other names: 20,25-Diazacholesterol; 20,25-Azacholesterol; Azasterol; Diazasterol; SC-12937; DAC; IMD-760; 17β-(3-(Dimethylamino)propyl)methyl- amino)androst-5-en-3β-ol
- Routes of administration: By mouth

Identifiers
- IUPAC name: (3S,8R,9S,10R,13S,14S,17S)-17-[3-(dimethylamino)propyl-methylamino]-10,13-dimethyl-2,3,4,7,8,9,11,12,14,15,16,17-dodecahydro-1H-cyclopenta[a]phenanthren-3-ol
- CAS Number: 313-05-3 1249-84-9 (hydrochloride)
- PubChem CID: 10023199
- ChemSpider: 8198772
- UNII: EPT876J73A
- ChEMBL: ChEMBL1615357
- CompTox Dashboard (EPA): DTXSID1058509

Chemical and physical data
- Formula: C_{25}H_{44}N_{2}O
- Molar mass: 388.640 g·mol^{−1}
- 3D model (JSmol): Interactive image
- SMILES: C[C@]12CC[C@H]3[C@H]([C@@H]1CC[C@@H]2N(C)CCCN(C)C)CC=C4[C@@]3(CC[C@@H](C4)O)C
- InChI: InChI=1S/C25H44N2O/c1-24-13-11-19(28)17-18(24)7-8-20-21-9-10-23(25(21,2)14-12-22(20)24)27(5)16-6-15-26(3)4/h7,19-23,28H,6,8-17H2,1-5H3/t19-,20-,21-,22-,23-,24-,25-/m0/s1; Key:FMTFZYKYVZBISL-HUVRVWIJSA-N

Azacosterol (INN), or azacosterol hydrochloride (USAN) (brand name Ornitrol), also called 20,25-diazacholesterol, is a cholesterol-lowering drug (hypocholesteremic), which was marketed previously, but has since been discontinued. It is also an avian chemosterilant used to control pest pigeon populations via inducing sterility. The drug is a sterol and derivative of cholesterol in which two carbon atoms have been replaced with nitrogen atoms.

Azacosterol acts as an inhibitor of 24-dehydrocholesterol reductase (24-DHCR), preventing the formation of cholesterol from desmosterol. Although it primarily acts to inhibit 24-DHCR, the drug also inhibits other steps in cholesterol biosynthesis. The antifertility effects of the drug in birds are mediated by inhibition of steroid hormone production, steroid hormones being synthesized from cholesterol. Due to prevention of the metabolism of desmosterol, the drug causes it to accumulate, in turn producing side effects such as hyperkeratosis, particularly of the palms and soles.

== See also ==
- Desmosterolosis
- Triparanol
- X-linked ichthyosis
