= Lanosterol 14 alpha-demethylase =

Protein-coding gene in the species Homo sapiens

CYP51A1

Identifiers
- Aliases: CYP51A1, CP51, CYP51, CYPL1, LDM, P450-14DM, P450L1, cytochrome P450 family 51 subfamily A member 1
- External IDs: OMIM: 601637; MGI: 106040; GeneCards: CYP51A1
Available structures
PDB	Ortholog search: PDBe RCSB
PDB	List of PDB id codes 3JUS, 3JUV, 3LD6, 4UHI, 4UHL
Enzyme activity
EC #	BRENDA	ExPASy	KEGG	MetaCyc
1.14.14.154	↗	↗	↗	↗

Gene location (Human)
Chr.	Chromosome 7 (human)
Band	7q21.2	Start	92,084,987 bp
Band	7q21.2	End	92,134,803 bp

Gene location (Mouse)
Chr.	Chromosome 5 (mouse)
Band	5 A1|5 2.3 cM	Start	4,131,145 bp
Band	5 A1|5 2.3 cM	End	4,154,746 bp
RNA expression pattern
Bgee	Human / Mouse (ortholog); Top expressed in: ventricular zone; islet of Langerhans; ganglionic eminence; corpus callosum; C1 segment; right testis; duodenum; left testis; liver; superior frontal gyrus / Top expressed in: tail of embryo; genital tubercle; proximal tubule; right kidney; skin of external ear; superior cervical ganglion; human kidney; neural tube; ventricular zone; sciatic nerve; More reference expression data
BioGPS	n/a
Gene ontology
Molecular function	iron ion binding; metal ion binding; monooxygenase activity; heme binding; oxidoreductase activity, acting on paired donors, with incorporation or reduction of molecular oxygen; oxidoreductase activity; sterol 14-demethylase activity
Cellular component	integral component of membrane; organelle membrane; endoplasmic reticulum membrane; membrane; intracellular membrane-bounded organelle; plasma membrane; endoplasmic reticulum
Biological process	steroid metabolic process; sterol biosynthetic process; lipid metabolism; cholesterol metabolic process; cholesterol biosynthetic process via 24,25-dihydrolanosterol; sterol metabolic process; cholesterol biosynthetic process; steroid biosynthetic process; demethylation; regulation of cholesterol biosynthetic process; negative regulation of protein catabolic process; negative regulation of protein secretion; negative regulation of amyloid-beta clearance
Sources:Amigo / QuickGO
Orthologs
Databases	NCBI: entry; OMA: entry
Species	Human	Mouse
Entrez	1595	13121
Ensembl	ENSG00000001630	ENSMUSG00000001467
UniProt	Q16850	Q8K0C4
RefSeq (mRNA)	NM_001146152; NM_000786	NM_020010
RefSeq (protein)	NP_000777; NP_001139624	NP_064394
Location (UCSC)	Chr 7: 92.08 – 92.13 Mb	Chr 5: 4.13 – 4.15 Mb
PubMed search
- Wikidata
View/Edit Human	View/Edit Mouse

Cytochrome P450, Family 51, Subfamily A, Polypeptide 1

Identifiers
- Symbol: CYP51A1
- Alt. symbols: CYP51, P45014DM
- NCBI gene: 1595
- HGNC: 2649
- OMIM: 601637
- RefSeq: NM_000786
- UniProt: Q16850

Other data
- EC number: 1.14.14.154
- Locus: Chr. 7 q21.2-21.3
Search for
- Structures: Swiss-model
- Domains: InterPro

Lanosterol

Lanosterol 14α-demethylase (CYP51A1) is the animal version of a cytochrome P450 enzyme that is involved in the conversion of lanosterol to 4,4-dimethylcholesta-8(9),14,24-trien-3β-ol. The cytochrome P450 isoenzymes are a conserved group of proteins that serve as key players in the metabolism of organic substances and the biosynthesis of important steroids, lipids, and vitamins in eukaryotes. As a member of this family, lanosterol 14α-demethylase is responsible for an essential step in the biosynthesis of sterols. In particular, this protein catalyzes the removal of the C-14α-methyl group from lanosterol. This demethylation step is regarded as the initial checkpoint in the transformation of lanosterol to other sterols that are widely used within the cell.

== Evolution ==
The structural and functional properties of the cytochrome P450 superfamily have been subject to extensive diversification over the course of evolution. Recent estimates indicate that there are currently 267 families of CYP proteins participating in 10 classes of P450 electron transport systems. It is believed that 14α-demethylase or CYP51 diverged early in the cytochrome's evolutionary history and has preserved its function ever since; namely, the removal of the 14α-methyl group from sterol substrates.

Although CYP51's mode of action has been well conserved, the protein's sequence varies considerably between biological kingdoms. CYP51 sequence comparisons between kingdoms reveal only a 22-30% similarity in amino acid composition.

== Structure ==
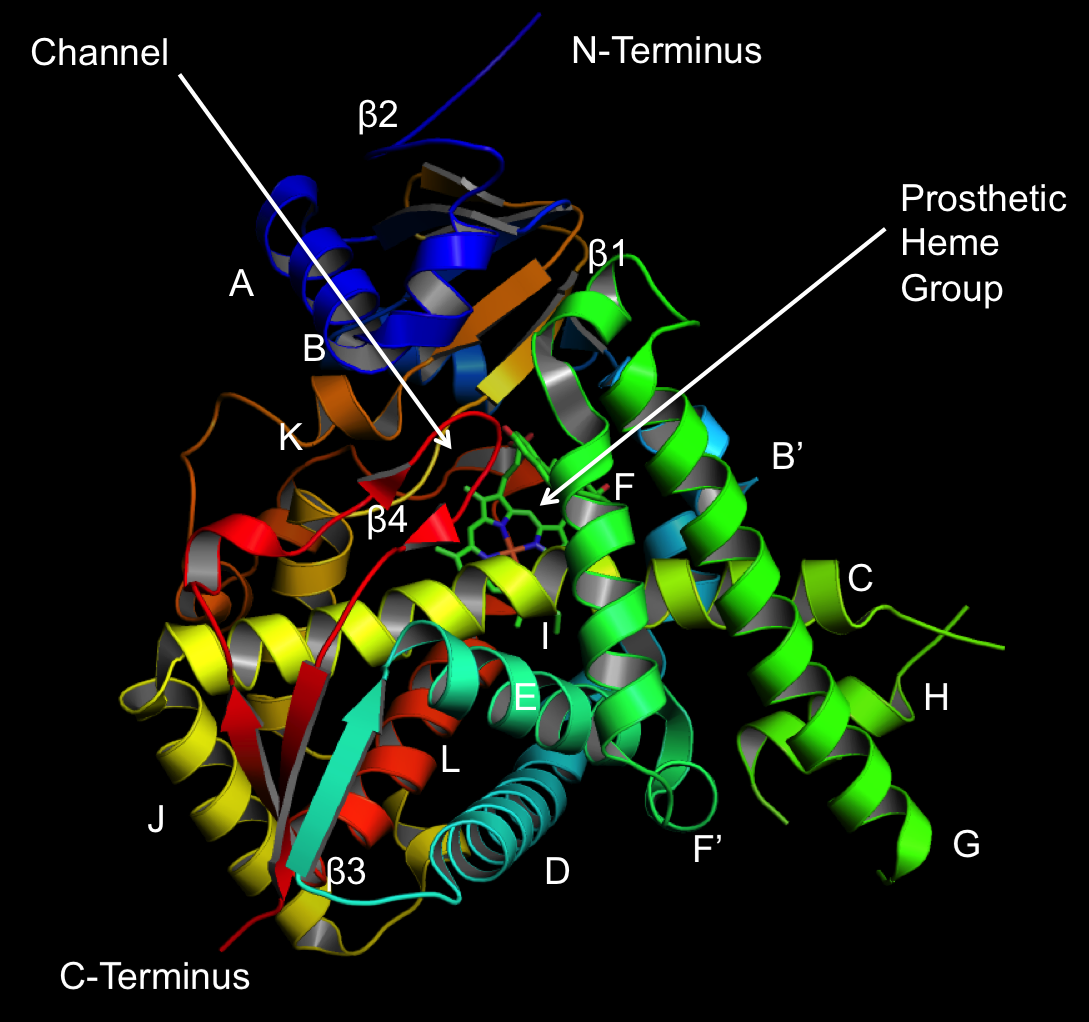
Structure of lanosterol 14α-demethylase (CYP51), as identified by Podust et al.

Although the structure of 14α-demethylase may vary substantially from one organism to the next, sequence alignment analysis reveals that there are six regions in the protein that are highly conserved in eukaryotes. These include residues in the B' helix, B'/C loop, C helix, I helix, K/β1-4 loop, and β-strand 1-4 that are responsible for forming the surface of the substrate binding cavity. Homology modeling reveals that substrates migrate from the surface of the protein to the enzyme's buried active site through a channel that is formed in part by the A' alpha helix and the β4 loop. Finally, the active site contains a heme prosthetic group in which the iron is tethered to the sulfur atom on a conserved cysteine residue. This group also binds diatomic oxygen at the sixth coordination site, which is eventually incorporated onto the substrate.

== Mechanism ==
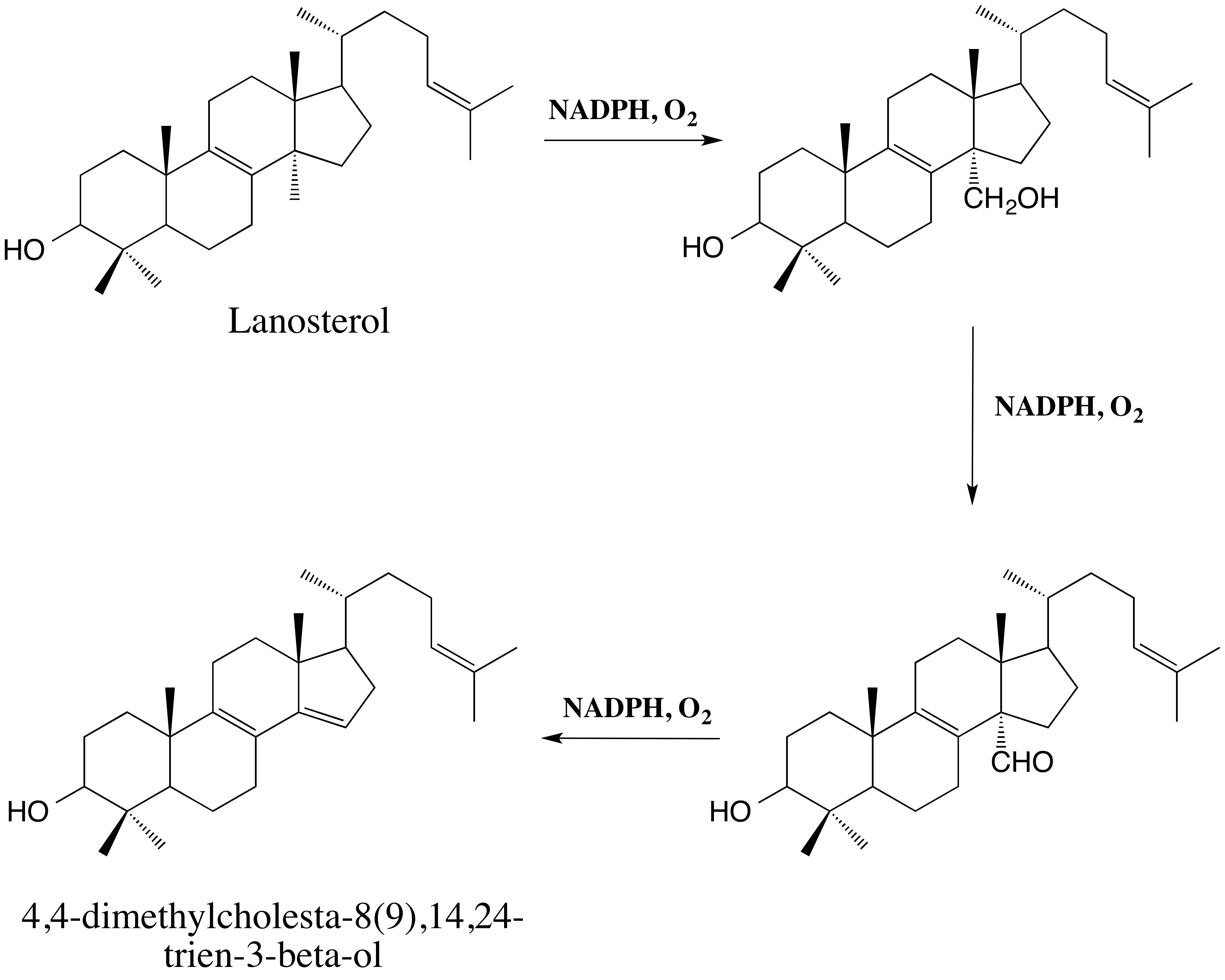
Three-step demethylation of lanosterol, mediated by lanosterol 14α-demethylase.

The enzyme-catalyzed demethylation of lanosterol is believed to occur in three steps, each of which requires one molecule of diatomic oxygen and one molecule of NADPH (or some other reducing equivalent). During the first two steps, the 14α-methyl group undergoes typical cytochrome monooxygenation in which one oxygen atom is incorporated by the substrate and the other is reduced to water, resulting in the sterol's conversion to a carboxyalcohol and then a carboxyaldehyde. The aldehyde then departs as formic acid and a double bond is simultaneously introduced to yield the demethylated product.

== See also ==
- Steroidogenic enzyme
- Azole antifungals
