= Erythropoietin in neuroprotection =

Role of the glycoprotein erythropoetin in protection of neurons

Erythropoietin in neuroprotection is the use of the glycoprotein erythropoietin (Epo) for neuroprotection. Epo controls erythropoiesis, or red blood cell production.

Erythropoietin and its receptor were thought to be present in the central nervous system according to experiments with antibodies that were subsequently shown to be nonspecific. While erythropoietin alpha is capable of crossing the blood brain barrier via active transport, concentrations in the central nervous system are very low. The possibility that Epo might have effects on neural tissues resulted in experiments to explore whether Epo might be tissue protective. The reported presence of Epo within the spinal fluid of infants and the expression of Epo-R in the spinal cord, suggested a potential role by Epo within the CNS therefore Epo represented a potential therapy to protect photoreceptors damaged from hypoxic pretreatment.

In some animal studies, Epo has been shown to protect nerve cells from hypoxia-induced glutamate toxicity. Epo has also been reported to enhance nerve recovery after spinal trauma. Celik and associates investigated motor neuron apoptosis in rabbits with a transient global spinal ischemia model. The functional neurological status of animals given RhEpo was better after recovery from anesthesia, and kept improving over a two-day period. The animals given saline demonstrated a poor functional neurological status and showed no significant improvements. These results suggested that RhEpo has both an acute and delayed beneficial action in ischemic spinal cord injury.

In contrast to these results, numerous studies have suggested that Epo had no neuroprotective benefit in animal models and EpoR was not detected in brain tissues using anti-EpoR antibodies that were shown to be sensitive and specific.

== Development with mutant Epo and EpoR ==
While EpoR was reportedly detected in the embryonic brain, its role in brain development is unclear. In one study Epo stimulated neural progenitor cells and prevented apoptosis in the embryonic brain in mice. Mice without EpoR demonstrated severe anemia, defective heart development, and eventually death around embryonic day 13.5 from apoptosis in the liver, endocardium, myocardium, and fetal brain. As early as embryonic day 10.5 the lack of EpoR can affect brain development by increasing fetal brain apoptosis and decreasing the number of neural progenitor cells. By exposing cultures of EpoR positive embryonic cortical neurons to stimulation by Epo administration, the cells decreased apoptosis, as opposed to the decrease in neuron generation in EpoR negative cells.

However it has been questioned whether EpoR may or may not be a determining factor for the nervous system function. The contribution of Epo and EpoR to neuroprotection and development are not as clearly understood as its role in erythropoiesis in hematopoietic tissue. In a line of mice that expressed EpoR exclusively in hematopoietic cells, the mice developed normally had normal brains and brain function and were fertile, despite the lack of EpoR in nonhematopoietic tissue. Differential expression of EpoR between erythroid cells. Most notably, plasma Epo concentration is regulated by nonhematopoietic EpoR expression when the peak of plasma concentrations for induced anemia in mutant and wild-type mice. The expression of EpoR in nonhematopoietic tissue is dispensable in normal mouse development, but that the sensitivity of erythroid progenitors to Epo is regulated by the expression of EpoR.

Erythropoietin mutants R103-E and S100-E (though S100 in Epo doesn't exist) has been reported to be non-erythropoietin but retain the neuroprotective function. Epo with R103 mutation is a potent inhibitor of wild type Epo from binding to its receptor. Though, the viral vector expressed R103-E Epo mutant was shown to be inhibitory to the progression / development of nervous tissue damage in many models, it is not shown to recover the nervous tissue post damage. Given the associated risks, it would be foolish to administer / express Mutant as a preventive measure from neuronal injury. Hence, from a medical or commercial point of view, safe and feasible neuro-protective Epo mutants are not possible.

Quite a bit of research emphasis is on non erythropoietic but, neuroprotective Peptides of Erythropoietin. Peptide of Epo with amino acids 92-111 is neuroprotective while its erythropoietic potency is 10 fold less than the wild type.

A short peptide sequence from the erythropoietin molecule called JM4, has been found to be non-erythropoietic yet theoretically neuroprotective and is being readied for Stage 1 and 2 clinical studies.

== Peripheral nervous system ==
=== Production and localization in PNS ===
Erythropoietin and its receptor are also reported in the peripheral nervous system, specifically in the bodies and axons of ganglions in the dorsal root, and at increased levels in Schwann cells after peripheral nerve injury. The distribution of EpoR was different from Epo, specifically in some neuronal cell bodies in the dorsal root ganglion, endothelial cells, and Schwann cells of normal nerves. Most importantly, experiments with immunostaining revealed that the distribution and concentration of EpoR on Schwann cells doesn't change after peripheral nerve injury. However those studies are of questionable significance since the antibodies were nonspecific to EpoR. Other research that suggested Epo is up-regulated according to mRNA expression in astrocytes and hypoxia-induced neurons, while EpoR is not. A correlation between the expression of Epo-R in ganglion cells and binding to sensory receptors in the periphery like Pacini bodies and neuromuscular spindles suggests that Epo-R is related to touch regulation.

== Peripheral nerve injury ==
=== Site of injury ===
After nerve injury, the increased production of Epo may induce activation of certain cellular pathways, while the concentration of EpoR doesn't change. In Schwann cells, increased erythropoietin levels may stimulate Schwann cell proliferation via JAK2 and ERK/MAP kinase activation to be explained later. Similar to stimulation of red blood cell precursor cells (erythrogenesis), erythropoietin stimulates non-differentiated Schwann cells to proliferate.

=== Anti-apoptosis mechanisms ===
Although the mechanism is unclear, it is apparent that erythropoietin has anti-apoptotic action after central and peripheral nerve injury. Cross-talk between JAK2 and NF-κB signaling cascades has been demonstrated to be a possible factor in central nerve injury. Erythropoietin has also been shown to prevent axonal degeneration when produced by neighboring Schwann cells with nitrous oxide as the axonal injury signal.

== Mode of action ==
=== Direct and indirect effects ===
Erythropoietin exerts its neuroprotective role directly by activating transmitter molecules that play a role in erythrogenesis and indirectly by restoring blood flow. Subcutaneous administration of RhEpo on cerebral blood flow autoregulation after experimental subarachnoid hemorrhage was studied. In different groups of male Sprague-Dawley Rats, the injection of Epo after induction of hemorrhage normalized the autoregulation of cerebral blood flow, while those treated with a vehicle showed no autoregulation.

=== Pathway ===
The pathway for erythropoietin in both the central and peripheral nervous systems begins with the binding of Epo to EpoR. This leads to the enzymatic phosphorylation of PI3-K and NF-κB and results in the activation of proteins that regulate nerve cell apoptosis. Recent research shows that Epo activates JAK2 cascades which activate NF-κB, leading to the expression of CIAP and c-IAP2, two apoptosis-inhibiting genes. Research conducted in rat hippocampal neurons demonstrates that the protective role of Epo in hypoxia-induced cell death acts through extracellular signal-regulated kinases ERK1, ERK2 and protein kinase Akt-1/PKB. The action of Epo is not limited to just promoting cell survival and that the inhibition of neural apoptosis underlies short latency protective effects of Epo after brain injury. Accordingly, the neurotrophic actions may demonstrate longer-latency effects, but more research needs to be conducted on its clinical safety and effectiveness.

=== Cerebral damage and inflammation ===
Additionally to the anti-apoptotic effect, Epo reduces inflammatory response during different types of cerebral injury via the NF-κB pathway. The NF-κB pathway activated by Epo/EpoR phosphorylation plays a role in regulating inflammatory and immune response, in addition to preventing apoptosis due to cellular stress. NF-κB proteins regulate immune response through B-lymphocyte control and T-lymphocyte proliferation. These proteins are all important for the expression of genes specific to immune and inflammatory response regulation.

== Neuroprotective effects ==
As a neuroprotective agent erythropoietin has many functions: antagonizing glutamate cytotoxic action, enhancing antioxidant enzyme expression, reducing free radical production rate, and affecting neurotransmitter release. It exerts its neuroprotective effect indirectly through restoration of blood flow or directly by activating transmitter molecules in neurons that also play a role in erythrogenesis. Although apoptosis is not reversible, early intervention with neuroprotective therapeutic procedures such as erythropoietin administration may reduce the number of neurons that undergo apoptosis.

=== Recombinant human EPO administration ===
The systemic administration of RhEpo has been shown to reduce dorsal root ganglion cell apoptosis. While animals treated with RhEpo weren't initially protected from mechanical allodynia after spinal nerve crush, a significantly improved recovery rate compared to animals not treated with RhEpo was demonstrated. This RhEpo therapy increased JAK2 phosphorylation, which has been found to be a key signaling step in Epo-induced neuroprotection by an anti-apoptotic mechanism. These findings demonstrate Epo therapy as a feasible treatment of neuropathic pain by reducing the protraction of pain after nerve injury. However, more studies need to be conducted to determine the optimal time and dosage for RhEpo treatment.

=== Neonatal brain injury ===
In infants with poor neurodevelopment, prematurity and asphyxia are typical problems. These conditions can lead to cerebral palsy, mental retardation, and sensory impairment. Hypothermia therapy for neonatal encephalopathy is a proven therapy for neonatal brain injury. However, recent research has demonstrated that high doses of recombinant erythropoietin can reduce or prevent this type of neonatal brain injury if administered early. A high rate of neuronal apoptosis is evident in the developing brain due to initial overproduction. Neurons that are electrically active and make synaptic connections survive, while those that do not undergo apoptosis. While this is a normal phenomenon, it is also known that neurons in the developing brain are at an increased risk to undergo apoptosis in response to injury. A small amount of the RhEpo can cross the blood–brain barrier and protect against hypoxic-ischemia injury. Epo treatment has also shown to preserve hemispheric brain volume 6 weeks after neonatal stroke. It demonstrated both neuroprotective effects and a direction towards neurogenesis in neonatal stroke without associated long-term difficulties.

=== Cognitive and behavioral effects ===
Systemic administration of RhEpo has also been shown to reduce lesion-associated behavioral impairment in hippocampally injured rats. The study confirmed that Epo administration improved posttraumatic behavioral and cognitive abilities versus a saline control that experienced no improvement, although it had no detectable effect on task acquisition in non-lesioned animals. Epo is able to reduce or eliminate the consequences of mechanical injury to the hippocampus but also demonstrates possible therapeutic effects in other cognitive domains.

=== Dopaminergic neurons ===
Epo was shown to specifically protect dopaminergic neurons, which are closely tied into attention deficit hyperactivity disorder. Specifically in mice, Epo demonstrated protective effects on nigral dopaminergic neurons in a mouse model of Parkinson's disease. This recent experiment tested the hypothesis that RhEpo could protect dopaminergic neurons and improve the neurobehavioral outcome in a rat model of Parkinson's Disease. The intrastriatal administration of RhEpo significantly reduced the degree of rotational asymmetry, and the RhEpo-treated rats demonstrated improvement in skilled forearm use. These experiments demonstrated that intrastriatal administration of RhEpo can protect nigral dopaminergic neurons from 6-OHDA induced cell death and improve neurobehavioral outcome in a rat model of Parkinson's Disease.

=== Current treatment ===
Currently methylprednisolone (Medrol) is only pharmaceutical agent used to treat spinal cord trauma. It is a corticosteroid that reduces damage to nerve cells and decreases inflammation near injury sites. It is typically administered within the first 8 hours after injury, but demonstrates poor results both in patients and experimental models. Some controversy has come about concerning the use of methylprednisolone because of its associated risks and poor clinical results, but it is the only medication available.

=== Neurotherapeutic role ===
If administered within a specific timeframe in experiments with erythropoietin in central nervous system, Epo has a favorable response in brain and spinal cord injuries like mechanical trauma or subarachnoid hemorrhages. Research also demonstrates a therapeutic role in modulating neuronal excitability and acting as a trophic factor both in vivo and in vitro. This administration of erythropoietin functions by inhibiting the apoptosis of sensor and motor neurons via stimulation of intracellular anti-apoptotic metabolic paths. The action of erythropoietin on Schwann cells and inflammatory response after neurological trauma also points to initial stimulation of nerve regeneration after peripheral nerve injury.

=== Role in neurogenesis ===
Erythropoietin and its receptor have an essential role in neurogenesis, specifically in post-stroke neurogenesis and in the migration of neuroblasts to areas of neural injury. Severe embryonic neurogenesis defects in animals that were null for Epo or EpoR genes are found. In EpoR knock-down animals, deletion of EpoR genes specific to the brain lead to a reduction in cell growth in the subventricular zone and impaired neurogenesis after stroke. This post-stroke neurogenesis was characterized by an impaired migration of neuroblasts in the peri-infarct cortex. This results is in agreement with the classical approach to Epo/EpoR contributions in development in that it demonstrated an Epo/EpoR requirement for embryonic neural development, adult neurogenesis, and neuron regeneration after injury. High doses of exogenous erythropoietin could demonstrate a neuroprotective role by binding to a receptor that contains the common beta receptor but lacks EpoR. These types of studies into Epo and EpoR null animals have seen and are further elucidating the neuroprotective role of Epo/EpoR in genetics and development.

=== Neuroregeneration ===
While the neuroprotective effects of Epo administration in models of brain injury and disease have been well described, the effects of Epo on Neuroregeneration are currently being investigated. Epo administration during optic nerve transaction was used to assess the neuroprotective properties in vivo as well as demonstrate the neuroregenerative capabilities. The intravitreal injection of Epo increased retinal ganglion cell somata and axon survival after transaction. A small amount of axons penetrated the transaction site and regenerated up to 1 mm into the distal nerve. In a second experiment, Epo doubled the number of retinal ganglion cell axons regenerating along a length of nerve grafted onto the retrobulbar optic nerve. This evidence of Epo as a neuroprotective and neuroregenerative agent is extremely promising for Epo as therapy in central nerve injury and repair.

== Research directions ==
Erythropoietin has shown to have a neuroprotective role in both the central and peripheral nervous system through pathways that inhibit apoptosis. It has been successful in demonstrating neuroprotective effects in many models of brain injury and in some experiments. It is also capable of influencing neuron stimulation and promoting peripheral nerve regeneration. Epo has a lot of potential uses and could provide a therapeutic answer for nervous system injury. However, more studies need to be conducted to determine the optimal time and dosage for Epo treatment.

== Glaucoma ==
Neuroprotection is also a concept used in ophthalmology regarding glaucoma. The only neuroprotection currently proven in glaucoma is intraocular pressure reduction. However, there are theories that there are other possible areas of neuroprotection, such as protecting from the toxicity induced by degenerating nerve fibres from glaucoma. Cell culture models show that retinal ganglion cells can be prevented from dying by certain pharmacological treatments. Intraperitoneal injection of Epo in DBA/2J mice protected / slowed down the degeneration of Retinal ganglion cell (RGC). Overexpression of Epo and Epo mutants in the eye via, viral vectors is toxic to the retina.

== See also ==
- Arctic Sun
- Primary and secondary brain injury
- Gacyclidine
