= C23H22FNO4 =

The molecular formula C_{23}H_{22}FNO_{4} may refer to:

- ALX-1393
- DAA-1106
