= Neurobiological effects of physical exercise =

Neural, cognitive, and behavioral effects of physical exercise

- Exercise therapy – medical intervention
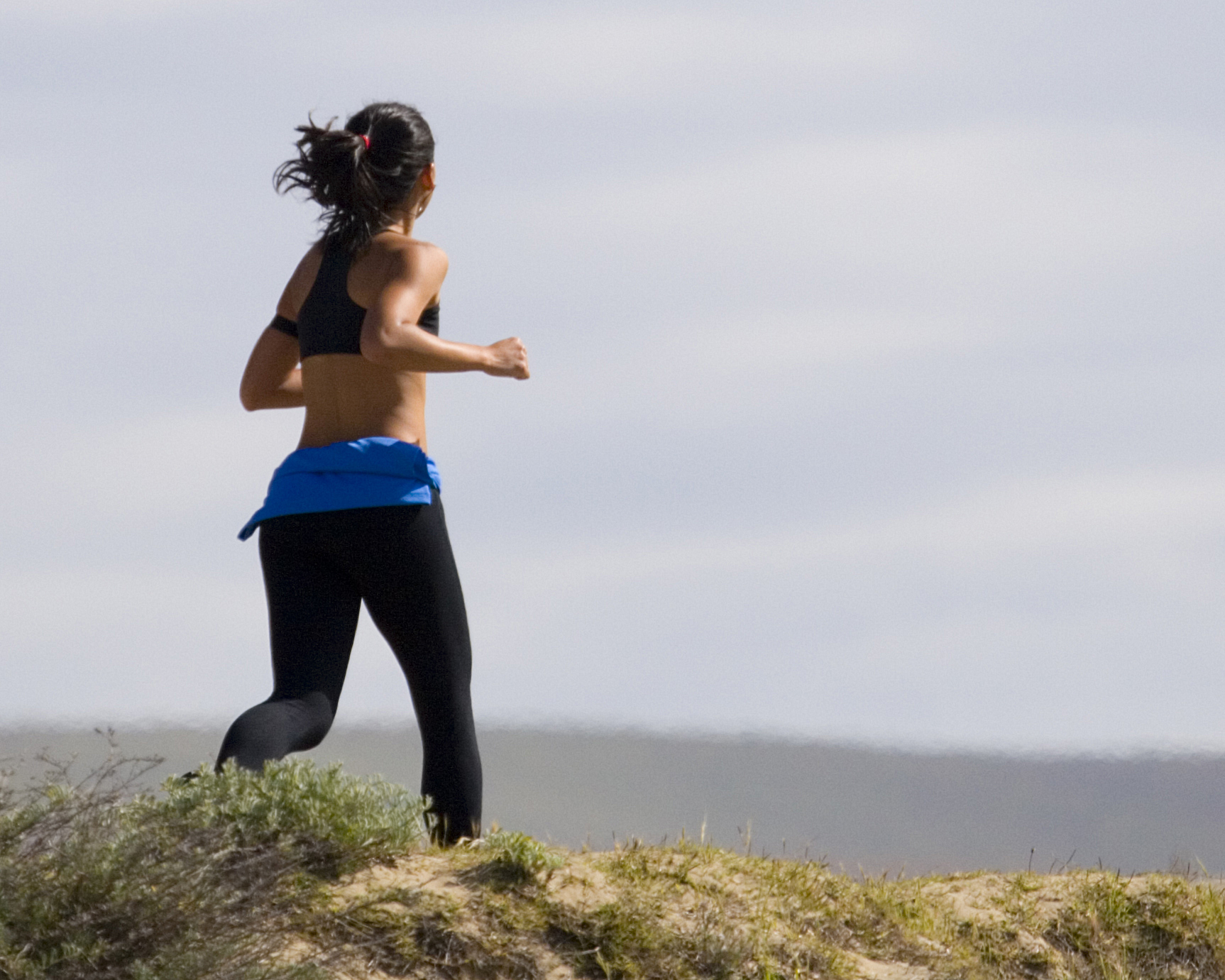
- A woman engaging in aerobic exercise (jogging)
- ICD-9-CM: 93.19
- MeSH: D005081
- LOINC: 73986-2
- eMedicine: 324583

The neurobiological effects of physical exercise involve possible interrelated effects on brain structure, brain function, and cognition. Research in humans has demonstrated that consistent aerobic exercise (e.g., 30 minutes every day) may induce improvements in certain cognitive functions, neuroplasticity and behavioral plasticity; some of these long-term effects may include increased neuron growth, increased neurological activity (e.g., c-Fos and BDNF signaling), improved stress coping, enhanced cognitive control of behavior, improved declarative, spatial, and working memory, and structural and functional improvements in brain structures and pathways associated with cognitive control and memory. The effects of exercise on cognition may affect academic performance in children and college students, improve adult productivity, preserve cognitive function in old age, prevent or treat certain neurological disorders, and improve overall quality of life.

In healthy adults, aerobic exercise has been shown to induce transient effects on cognition after a single exercise session and persistent effects on cognition following consistent exercise over the course of several months. People who regularly perform an aerobic exercise (e.g., running, jogging, brisk walking, swimming, and cycling) have greater scores on neuropsychological function and performance tests that measure certain cognitive functions, such as attentional control, inhibitory control, cognitive flexibility, working memory updating and capacity, declarative memory, spatial memory, and information processing speed.

Aerobic exercise has both short and long term effects on mood and emotional states by promoting positive affect, inhibiting negative affect, and decreasing the biological response to acute psychological stress. Aerobic exercise may affect both self-esteem and overall well-being (including sleep patterns) with consistent, long term participation. Regular aerobic exercise may improve symptoms associated with central nervous system disorders and may be used as adjunct therapy for these disorders. There is some evidence of exercise treatment efficacy for major depressive disorder.

Some preclinical evidence and emerging clinical evidence supports the use of exercise as an adjunct therapy for the treatment and prevention of drug addictions.

Reviews of clinical evidence also support the use of exercise as an adjunct therapy for certain neurodegenerative disorders, particularly Alzheimer's disease and Parkinson's disease. Regular exercise may be associated with a lower risk of developing neurodegenerative disorders.

== Long-term effects ==
=== Neuroplasticity ===
Neuroplasticity is the process by which neurons adapt to a disturbance over time, and most often occurs in response to repeated exposure to stimuli. Aerobic exercise increases the production of neurotrophic factors (Note: Neurotrophic factors are peptides or other small proteins that promote the growth, survival, and differentiation of neurons by binding to and activating their associated tyrosine kinases.) (e.g., BDNF, IGF-1, VEGF) which mediate improvements in cognitive functions and various forms of memory by promoting blood vessel formation in the brain, adult neurogenesis, (Note: Adult neurogenesis is the postnatal (after-birth) growth of new neurons, a beneficial form of neuroplasticity.) and other forms of neuroplasticity. Consistent aerobic exercise over a period of several months induces clinically significant improvements in executive functions and increased gray matter volume in nearly all regions of the brain, with the most marked increases occurring in brain regions that give rise to executive functions. The brain structures that show the greatest improvements in gray matter volume in response to aerobic exercise are the prefrontal cortex, caudate nucleus, and hippocampus; less significant increases in gray matter volume occur in the anterior cingulate cortex, parietal cortex, cerebellum, and nucleus accumbens. The prefrontal cortex, caudate nucleus, and anterior cingulate cortex are among the most significant brain structures in the dopamine and norepinephrine systems that give rise to cognitive control. Exercise-induced neurogenesis (i.e., the increases in gray matter volume) in the hippocampus is associated with measurable improvements in spatial memory. Higher physical fitness scores, as measured by VO_{2} max, are associated with better executive function, faster information processing speed, and greater gray matter volume of the hippocampus, caudate nucleus, and nucleus accumbens.

==== Structural growth ====
Reviews of neuroimaging studies indicate that consistent aerobic exercise increases gray matter volume in nearly all regions of the brain, with more pronounced increases occurring in brain regions associated with memory processing, cognitive control, motor function, and reward; the most prominent gains in gray matter volume are seen in the prefrontal cortex, caudate nucleus, and hippocampus, which support cognitive control and memory processing, among other cognitive functions. Moreover, the left and right halves of the prefrontal cortex, the hippocampus, and the cingulate cortex appear to become more functionally interconnected in response to consistent aerobic exercise. Three reviews indicate that marked improvements in prefrontal and hippocampal gray matter volume occur in healthy adults that regularly engage in medium intensity exercise for several months. Other regions of the brain that demonstrate moderate or less significant gains in gray matter volume during neuroimaging include the anterior cingulate cortex, parietal cortex, cerebellum, and nucleus accumbens.

Regular exercise has been shown to counter the shrinking of the hippocampus and memory impairment that naturally occurs in late adulthood. Sedentary adults over age 55 show a 1–2% decline in hippocampal volume annually. A neuroimaging study with a sample of 120 adults revealed that participating in regular aerobic exercise increased the volume of the left hippocampus by 2.12% and the right hippocampus by 1.97% over a one-year period. Subjects in the low intensity stretching group who had higher fitness levels at baseline showed less hippocampal volume loss, providing evidence for exercise being protective against age-related cognitive decline. In general, individuals that exercise more over a given period have greater hippocampal volumes and better memory function. Aerobic exercise has also been shown to induce growth in the white matter tracts in the anterior corpus callosum, which normally shrink with age.

The various functions of the brain structures that show exercise-induced increases in gray matter volume include:

- Caudate nucleus – responsible for stimulus-response learning and inhibitory control; implicated in Parkinson's disease and ADHD
- Cerebellum – responsible for motor coordination and motor learning
- Hippocampus – responsible for storage and consolidation of declarative memory and spatial memory
- Nucleus accumbens – responsible for incentive salience ("wanting" or desire, the form of motivation associated with reward) and positive reinforcement; implicated in addiction
- Parietal cortex – responsible for sensory perception, working memory, and attention
- Prefrontal and anterior cingulate cortices – required for the cognitive control of behavior, particularly: working memory, attentional control, decision-making, cognitive flexibility, social cognition, and inhibitory control of behavior; implicated in attention deficit hyperactivity disorder (ADHD) and addiction

==== Persistent effects on cognition ====
Concordant with the functional roles of the brain structures that exhibit increased gray matter volumes, regular exercise over a period of several months has been shown to persistently improve numerous executive functions and several forms of memory, though this view is increasingly challenged. In particular, consistent aerobic exercise has been shown to improve attentional control, (Note: Attentional control allows an individual to focus their attention on a specific source and ignore other stimuli that compete for one's attention, such as in the cocktail party effect.) information processing speed, cognitive flexibility (e.g., task switching), inhibitory control, (Note: Inhibitory control is the process of altering one's learned behavioral responses, sometimes called "prepotent responses", in a way that makes it easier to complete a particular goal. Inhibitory control allows individuals to control their impulses and habits when necessary or desired, e.g., to overcome procrastination.) working memory updating and capacity, (Note: Working memory is the form of memory used by an individual at any given moment for active information processing, such as when reading or writing an encyclopedia article. Working memory has a limited capacity and functions as an information buffer, analogous to a computer's data buffer, that permits the manipulation of information for comprehension, decision-making, and guidance of behavior.) declarative memory, (Note: Declarative memory, also known as explicit memory, is the form of memory that pertains to facts and events.) and spatial memory. In healthy young and middle-aged adults, the effect sizes of improvements in cognitive function are largest for indices of executive functions and small to moderate for aspects of memory and information processing speed. It may be that in older adults, individuals benefit cognitively by taking part in both aerobic and resistance type exercise of at least moderate intensity. Individuals who have a sedentary lifestyle tend to have impaired executive functions relative to other more physically active non-exercisers. A reciprocal relationship between exercise and executive functions has also been noted: improvements in executive control processes, such as attentional control and inhibitory control, increase an individual's tendency to exercise. However, a more recent meta-analysis concluded that exercise has an at-most low and likely negligible effect on cognition. After adjusting for publication bias and incorporating studies with active control groups, aerobic exercise only has an effect size of d = 0.05, indicating a very small to small effect. Other meta-analyses including active controls support this conclusion, suggesting that the cognitive effects of aerobic exercise are largely placebo responses.

=== Mechanism of effects ===
==== BDNF signaling ====
One of the most significant effects of exercise on the brain is increased synthesis and expression of BDNF, a neuropeptide and hormone, resulting in increased signaling through its receptor tyrosine kinase, tropomyosin receptor kinase B (TrkB). Since BDNF is capable of crossing the blood–brain barrier, higher peripheral BDNF synthesis also increases BDNF signaling in the brain. Exercise-induced increases in BDNF signaling are associated with improved cognitive function, improved mood, and improved memory. Furthermore, research has provided a great deal of support for the role of BDNF in hippocampal neurogenesis, synaptic plasticity, and neural repair. Engaging in moderate-high intensity aerobic exercise such as running, swimming, and cycling increases BDNF biosynthesis through myokine signaling, resulting in up to a threefold increase in blood plasma and BDNF levels; exercise intensity is positively correlated with the magnitude of increased BDNF biosynthesis and expression. A meta-analysis of studies involving the effect of exercise on BDNF levels found that consistent exercise modestly increases resting BDNF levels as well. This has important implications for exercise as a mechanism to reduce stress since stress is closely linked with decreased levels of BDNF in the hippocampus. In fact, studies suggest that BDNF contributes to the anxiety-reducing effects of antidepressants. The increase in BDNF levels caused by exercise helps reverse the stress-induced decrease in BDNF which mediates stress in the short term and buffers against stress-related diseases in the long term.

==== Cytokines ====
Cytokines are small proteins and peptides released by muscle cells during exercise or contraction that are emitted during power and resistance training, signaling the immune system. They are secreted by various cell types, including immune cells, such as macrophages, T cells, and dendritic cells, endothelial cells, and fibroblasts. Cytokines facilitate the communication between cells, coordinating varieties of immune responses such as inflammation, cell activation, proliferation, differentiation, and apoptosis, (the death of a cell). Cytokines can act in an autocrine, paracrine, or endocrine manner, depending on the target cells they influence. Cytokine signaling is a must to maintaining immune homeostasis, defense against pathogens, and resolution of inflammation.

==== IGF-1 signaling ====
IGF-1 is a peptide and neurotrophic factor that mediates some of the effects of growth hormone; IGF-1 elicits its physiological effects by binding to a specific receptor tyrosine kinase, the IGF-1 receptor, to control tissue growth and remodeling. In the brain, IGF-1 functions as a neurotrophic factor that, like BDNF, plays a significant role in cognition, neurogenesis, and neuronal survival. Physical activity is associated with increased levels of IGF-1 in blood serum, which is known to contribute to neuroplasticity in the brain due to its capacity to cross the blood–brain barrier and blood–cerebrospinal fluid barrier; consequently, one review noted that IGF-1 is a key mediator of exercise-induced adult neurogenesis, while a second review characterized it as a factor which links "body fitness" with "brain fitness". The amount of IGF-1 released into blood plasma during exercise is positively correlated with exercise intensity and duration.

==== VEGF signaling ====
VEGF is a neurotrophic and angiogenic (i.e., blood vessel growth-promoting) signaling protein that binds to two receptor tyrosine kinases, VEGFR1 and VEGFR2, which are expressed in neurons and glial cells in the brain. Hypoxia, or inadequate cellular oxygen supply, strongly upregulates VEGF expression and VEGF exerts a neuroprotective effect in hypoxic neurons. Like BDNF and IGF-1, aerobic exercise has been shown to increase VEGF biosynthesis in peripheral tissue which subsequently crosses the blood–brain barrier and promotes neurogenesis and blood vessel formation in the central nervous system. Exercise-induced increases in VEGF signaling have been shown to improve cerebral blood volume and contribute to exercise-induced neurogenesis in the hippocampus.

== Short-term effects ==
=== Transient effects on cognition ===
In addition to the persistent effects on cognition that result from several months of daily exercise, acute exercise (i.e., a single bout of exercise) has been shown to transiently improve a number of cognitive functions. Reviews and meta-analyses of research on the effects of acute exercise on cognition in healthy young and middle-aged adults have concluded that information processing speed and a number of executive functions – including attention, working memory, problem solving, cognitive flexibility, verbal fluency, decision making, and inhibitory control – all improve for a period of up to 2 hours post-exercise. A systematic review of studies conducted on children also suggested that some of the exercise-induced improvements in executive function are apparent after single bouts of exercise, while other aspects (e.g., attentional control) only improve following consistent exercise on a regular basis. Other research has suggested immediate performative enhancements during exercise, such as exercise-concurrent improvements in processing speed and accuracy during both visual attention and working memory tasks.

=== Exercise-induced euphoria ===
Continuous exercise can produce a transient state of euphoria – an emotional state involving the experience of pleasure and feelings of profound contentment, elation, and well-being – which is colloquially known as a "runner's high" in distance running or a "rower's high" in rowing.

== Effects on neurochemistry ==
=== β-Phenylethylamine ===
Biosynthetic pathways for catecholamines and trace amines in the human brain
In humans, catecholamines and phenethylaminergic trace amines are derived from the amino acid L-phenylalanine.

β-Phenylethylamine, commonly referred to as phenethylamine, is a human trace amine and potent catecholaminergic and glutamatergic neuromodulator that has similar psychostimulant and euphoriant effects and a similar chemical structure to amphetamine. Thirty minutes of moderate to high intensity physical exercise has been shown to induce an enormous increase in urinary β-phenylacetic acid, the primary metabolite of phenethylamine. Two reviews noted a study where the average 24 hour urinary β-phenylacetic acid concentration among participants following just 30 minutes of intense exercise increased by 77% relative to baseline concentrations in resting control subjects; the reviews suggest that phenethylamine synthesis sharply increases while an individual is exercising, during which time it is rapidly metabolized due to its short half-life of roughly 30 seconds. In a resting state, phenethylamine is synthesized in catecholamine neurons from L-phenylalanine by aromatic amino acid decarboxylase (AADC) at approximately the same rate at which dopamine is produced.

In light of this observation, the original paper and both reviews suggest that phenethylamine plays a prominent role in mediating the mood-enhancing euphoric effects of a runner's high, as both phenethylamine and amphetamine are potent euphoriants.

=== β-Endorphin ===
β-Endorphin (contracted from "endogenous morphine") is an endogenous opioid neuropeptide that binds to μ-opioid receptors, in turn producing euphoria and pain relief. A meta-analytic review found that exercise significantly increases the secretion of β-endorphin and that this secretion is correlated with improved mood states. Moderate intensity exercise produces the greatest increase in β-endorphin synthesis, while higher and lower intensity forms of exercise are associated with smaller increases in β-endorphin synthesis. A review on β-endorphin and exercise noted that an individual's mood improves for the remainder of the day following physical exercise and that one's mood is positively correlated with overall daily physical activity level.

However, human studies showed that pharmacological blockade of endogenous endorphins does not inhibit a runner's high, while blockade of endocannabinoids may have such an effect.

=== Anandamide ===
Anandamide is an endogenous cannabinoid and retrograde neurotransmitter that binds to cannabinoid receptors (primarily CB_{1}), in turn producing euphoria. It has been shown that aerobic exercise causes an increase in plasma anandamide levels, where the magnitude of this increase is highest at moderate exercise intensity (i.e., exercising at ~70–80% maximum heart rate). Increases in plasma anandamide levels are associated with psychoactive effects because anandamide is able to cross the blood–brain barrier and act within the central nervous system. Thus, because anandamide is a euphoriant and aerobic exercise is associated with euphoric effects, it has been proposed that anandamide partly mediates the short-term mood-lifting effects of exercise (e.g., the euphoria of a runner's high) via exercise-induced increases in its synthesis.

=== Cortisol and the psychological stress response ===
Diagram of the hypothalamic–pituitary–adrenal axis

The "stress hormone", cortisol, is a glucocorticoid that binds to glucocorticoid receptors. Psychological stress induces the release of cortisol from the adrenal gland by activating the hypothalamic–pituitary–adrenal axis (HPA axis). Short-term increases in cortisol levels are associated with adaptive cognitive improvements, such as enhanced inhibitory control; however, excessively high exposure or prolonged exposure to high levels of cortisol causes impairments in cognitive control and has neurotoxic effects in the human brain. For example, chronic psychological stress decreases BDNF expression, which has detrimental effects on hippocampal volume and can lead to depression.

As a physical stressor, aerobic exercise stimulates cortisol secretion in an intensity-dependent manner; however, it does not result in long-term increases in cortisol production since this exercise-induced effect on cortisol is a response to transient negative energy balance. (Note: In healthy individuals, this energy deficit resolves simply from eating and drinking a sufficient amount of food and beverage after exercising.) Aerobic exercise increases physical fitness and lowers neuroendocrine (i.e., HPA axis) reactivity and therefore reduces the biological response to psychological stress in humans (e.g., reduced cortisol release and attenuated heart rate response). Exercise also reverses stress-induced decreases in BDNF expression and signaling in the brain, thereby acting as a buffer against stress-related diseases like depression.

=== Glutamate and GABA ===
Glutamate, one of the most common neurochemicals in the brain, is an excitatory neurotransmitter involved in many aspects of brain function, including learning and memory. Based upon animal models, exercise appears to normalize the excessive levels of glutamate neurotransmission into the nucleus accumbens that occurs in drug addiction. A review of the effects of exercise on neurocardiac function in preclinical models noted that exercise-induced neuroplasticity of the rostral ventrolateral medulla (RVLM) has an inhibitory effect on glutamatergic neurotransmission in this region, in turn reducing sympathetic activity; the review hypothesized that this neuroplasticity in the RVLM is a mechanism by which regular exercise prevents inactivity-related cardiovascular disease.

=== Exerkines ===
The term "exerkines" refers to signalling molecules - including proteins, peptides, metabolites, and nucleic acids - that are released into circulation during or after physical exercise. Exerkines produced by skeletal muscle, liver, adipose tissue, and platelets act via endocrine, paracrine, and autocrine signalling pathways to mediate exercise-induced changes in cognitive function, synaptic plasticity, and neurogenesis. Several exerkines, notably irisin, BDNF, lactate, clusterin, GPLD1, and CXCL4, are capable of crossing the blood–brain barrier from the periphery, where they can then bind to receptors on neurons that enable direct effects within the brain.

Exercise-induced increases in irisin and BDNF synthesis enhance hippocampal neurogenesis, synaptic plasticity, and neuronal survival, all processes closely linked to improved memory and cognitive performance. Similarly, circulating lactate and BAIBA from skeletal muscle and β-hydroxybutyrate from the liver directly influence mitochondrial metabolism in the central nervous system, a mechanism that helps facilitate neuronal energetics and cognitive resilience. Additional exerkines such as clusterin and CXCL4 appear to reduce hippocampal inflammation and promote neural cell proliferation, which may mitigate age-related impairments in cognitive function. While aerobic and resistance exercise induce partially overlapping profiles of circulating exerkines, one review found that they each elicit distinct exerkine profiles and may differentially influence cognitive adaptions to exercise as a consequence.

== Effects in children ==
Engaging in active physical pursuits has demonstrated positive effects on the mental health of children and adolescents, enhances their academic performance, boosts cognitive function, and diminishes the likelihood of obesity and cardiovascular diseases among this demographic. Establishing consistent exercise routines with regular frequency and duration is pivotal. Cultivating beneficial exercise habits and sustaining adequate physical activity may support the overall physical and mental well-being of young individuals. Therefore, identifying factors that either impede or encourage exercise behaviors could be a significant strategy in promoting the development of healthy exercise habits among children and adolescents.

A 2003 meta-analysis found a positive effect of exercise in children on perceptual skills, intelligence quotient, achievement, verbal tests, mathematic tests, and academic readiness. The correlation was strongest for the age ranges of 4–7 and 11–13 years.

A 2010 meta-analysis of the effect of activity on children's executive function found that aerobic exercise may briefly aid children's executive function and also influence more lasting improvements to executive function. Other studies suggested that exercise is unrelated to academic performance, perhaps due to the parameters used to determine exactly what academic achievement is. This area of study has been a focus for education boards that make decisions on whether physical education should be implemented in the school curriculum, how much time should be dedicated to physical education, and its impact on other academic subjects.

Another study found that sixth-graders who participated in vigorous physical activity at least three times a week had the highest scores compared to those who participated in moderate or no physical activity at all. Children who participated in vigorous physical activity scored three points higher, on average, on their academic test, which consisted of math, science, English, and world studies.

Neuroimaging studies indicate that exercise may influence changes in brain structure and function. Some investigations have linked low levels of aerobic fitness in children with impaired executive function when older as adults, but lack of selective attention, response inhibition, and interference control may also explain this outcome.

== Effects on central nervous system disorders ==
=== Exercise as prevention and treatment of drug addictions ===
Clinical and preclinical evidence indicate that consistent aerobic exercise, especially endurance exercise (e.g., marathon running), actually prevents the development of certain drug addictions and is an effective adjunct treatment for drug addiction, and psychostimulant addiction in particular. Consistent aerobic exercise magnitude-dependently (i.e., by duration and intensity) may reduce drug addiction risk, which appears to occur through the reversal of drug-induced, addiction-related neuroplasticity. Moreover, aerobic exercise decreases psychostimulant self-administration, reduces the reinstatement (i.e., relapse) of drug-seeking, and induces opposite effects on striatal dopamine receptor D_{2} (DRD2) signaling (increased DRD2 density) to those induced by pathological stimulant use (decreased DRD2 density). Consequently, consistent aerobic exercise may lead to better treatment outcomes when used as an adjunct treatment for drug addiction. As of 2016, more clinical research is still needed to understand the mechanisms and confirm the efficacy of exercise in drug addiction treatment and prevention.

Summary of addiction-related plasticity
Form of neuroplasticity or behavioral plasticity	Type of reinforcer						Ref.
Form of neuroplasticity or behavioral plasticity	Opiates	Psychostimulants	High fat or sugar food	Sexual intercourse	Physical exercise (aerobic)	Environmental enrichment	Ref.
ΔFosB expression in nucleus accumbens D1-type MSNs	↑	↑	↑	↑	↑	↑	
Behavioral plasticity
Escalation of intake	Yes	Yes	Yes				
Psychostimulant cross-sensitization	Yes	Not applicable	Yes	Yes	Attenuated	Attenuated	
Psychostimulant self-administration	↑	↑	↓		↓	↓	
Psychostimulant conditioned place preference	↑	↑	↓	↑	↓	↑	
Reinstatement of drug-seeking behavior	↑	↑			↓	↓	
Neurochemical plasticity
CREB phosphorylation in the nucleus accumbens	↓	↓	↓		↓	↓	
Sensitized dopamine response in the nucleus accumbens	No	Yes	No	Yes			
Altered striatal dopamine signaling	↓DRD2, ↑DRD3	↑DRD1, ↓DRD2, ↑DRD3	↑DRD1, ↓DRD2, ↑DRD3		↑DRD2	↑DRD2	
Altered striatal opioid signaling	No change or ↑μ-opioid receptors	↑μ-opioid receptors ↑κ-opioid receptors	↑μ-opioid receptors	↑μ-opioid receptors	No change	No change	
Changes in striatal opioid peptides	↑dynorphin No change: enkephalin	↑dynorphin	↓enkephalin		↑dynorphin	↑dynorphin	
Mesocorticolimbic synaptic plasticity
Number of dendrites in the nucleus accumbens	↓	↑		↑			
Dendritic spine density in the nucleus accumbens	↓	↑		↑			

=== Attention deficit hyperactivity disorder ===
Exercise does not reduce the symptoms of ADHD according to the International Consensus Statement. This conclusion is based on two meta-analyses: one of 10 studies with 300 children and the other of 15 studies and 668 participants, which showed that exercise yields no statistically significant reductions on ADHD symptoms. A 2024 systematic review and meta analysis commissioned by the Patient-Centered Outcomes Research Institute (PCORI) identified seven studies on the effectiveness of physical exercise for treating ADHD symptoms. The type and amount of exercise varied widely across studies from martial arts interventions to treadmill training, to table tennis or aerobic exercise. Effects reported were not replicated, causing the authors to conclude that there is insufficient evidence that exercise is an effective form of treatment for ADHD symptoms.

=== Major depressive disorder ===
Numerous systematic reviews and meta-analyses have indicated that exercise has a marked and persistent antidepressant effect in humans, an effect believed to be mediated through enhanced BDNF signaling in the brain. Several systematic reviews have analyzed the potential for physical exercise in the treatment of depressive disorders. The 2026 Cochrane Collaboration review on physical exercise for depression noted that, based upon limited evidence, it is more effective than a control intervention and comparable to psychological or antidepressant drug therapies. Three subsequent 2014 systematic reviews that included the Cochrane review in their analysis concluded with similar findings: one indicated that physical exercise is effective as an adjunct treatment (i.e., treatments that are used together) with antidepressant medication; the other two indicated that physical exercise has marked antidepressant effects and recommended the inclusion of physical activity as an adjunct treatment for mild–moderate depression and mental illness in general. A 2016 meta-analysis concluded that physical exercise improves overall quality of life in individuals with depression relative to controls. One systematic review noted that Yoga as exercise may be effective in alleviating symptoms of prenatal depression. Another review asserted that evidence from clinical trials supports the efficacy of physical exercise as a treatment for depression over a 2–4 month period. These benefits have also been noted in old age, with a review conducted in 2019 finding that exercise is an effective treatment for clinically diagnosed depression in older adults.

A 2024 systematic review and network meta-analysis of 218 randomized controlled trials involving over 14,000 participants found that various forms of exercise, including walking or jogging, yoga as exercise, resistance training, and mixed aerobic activities, were associated with reductions in depressive symptoms. The review observed that the effects of exercise were comparable to those of psychotherapy and pharmacotherapy, with more intensive exercise yielding greater benefits. Resistance training was identified as particularly effective for younger individuals, while yoga as exercise appeared to be more beneficial for older adults. While confidence in the findings was limited by methodological concerns in the included studies, the review noted that exercise produced significant improvements in symptoms across a wide range of participants and treatment contexts.

=== Cerebrovascular disease ===
Physical exercise plays a significant role in the prevention and management of stroke. It is well established that physical activity decrease the risk of ischemic stroke and intracerebral haemorrhage. Engaging in physical activity before experiencing a stroke has been found to have a positive impact on the severity and outcomes of stroke. Exercise has the potential to increase the expression of VEGF, caveolin, and angiopoietin in the brain. These changes may promote angiogenesis and neovascularization that contribute to improved blood supply to the stroke affected areas of the brain. Exercise may affect the activation of endothelial nitric oxide synthase (eNOS) and subsequent production of nitric oxide (NO). The increase in NO production may lead to improved post-stroke cerebral blood flow, ensuring a sufficient oxygen and nutrient supply to the brain. Physical activity has been associated with increased expression and activation of hypoxia-inducible factor 1 alpha (HIF-1α), heat shock proteins, and brain-derived neurotrophic factor (BDNF). These factors play crucial roles in promoting cellular survival, neuroprotection, and repair processes in the brain following a stroke. Exercise also inhibit glutamate and caspase activities, which are involved in neuronal death pathways. Additionally, it may promote neurogenesis in the brain. These effects collectively contribute to the reduction of brain infarction and edema, leading to potential improvements in neurological and functional outcomes. The neuroprotective properties of physical activity in relation to haemorrhagic strokes are less studied. Pre-stroke physical activity has been associated with improved outcomes after intracerebral haemorrhages. Furthermore, physical activity may reduce the volume of intracerebral haemorrhages. Being physically active after stroke also enhance the functional recovery.

=== Neurodegenerative disorders ===
==== Alzheimer's disease ====
Alzheimer's disease is a cortical neurodegenerative disorder and the most prevalent form of dementia, representing approximately 65% of all cases of dementia; it is characterized by impaired cognitive function, behavioral abnormalities, and a reduced capacity to perform basic activities of daily life. Two reviews found evidence for possible positive effects of physical exercise on cognitive function, the rate of cognitive decline, and the ability to perform activities of daily living in individuals with Alzheimer's disease. A subsequent review found higher levels of physical activity may be associated with reduced risk of dementia and cognitive decline.

==== Parkinson's disease ====
Parkinson's disease symptoms reflect various functional impairments and limitations, such as postural instability, gait disturbance, immobility, and frequent falls. Some evidence suggests that physical exercise may lower the risk of Parkinson's disease. A 2017 study found that strength and endurance training in people with Parkinson's disease had positive effects lasting for several weeks. A 2023 Cochrane review on the effects of physical exercise in people with Parkinson's disease indicated that aquatic exercise might reduce severity of motor symptoms and improve quality of life. Furthermore, endurance training, functional training, and multi-domain training (i.e., engaging in several types of exercise) may provide improvements.

== See also ==
- Brain fitness
- Exercise is Medicine
- Exercise prescription
- Exercise therapy
- Memory improvement
- Neuroinflammation#Exercise
- Nootropic
