= TSPO =

TSPO can refer to:

- Tokyo Ska Paradise Orchestra
- Translocator protein
