= U-89843A =

Chemical compound

Legal status
- Legal status: In general: legal

Identifiers
- IUPAC name: 6,7-dimethyl-2,4-dipyrrolidin-1-yl-7H-pyrrolo[2,3-d]pyrimidine
- CAS Number: 157013-32-6
- PubChem CID: 154689
- ChemSpider: 136273
- UNII: 7Z7PKS2MXZ
- CompTox Dashboard (EPA): DTXSID80166193

Chemical and physical data
- Formula: C_{16}H_{23}N_{5}
- Molar mass: 285.395 g·mol^{−1}
- 3D model (JSmol): Interactive image
- SMILES: CC1=CC2=C(N1C)N=C(N=C2N3CCCC3)N4CCCC4
- InChI: InChI=1S/C16H23N5/c1-12-11-13-14(19(12)2)17-16(21-9-5-6-10-21)18-15(13)20-7-3-4-8-20/h11H,3-10H2,1-2H3; Key:UADIKEUOAMACNA-UHFFFAOYSA-N

U-89843A (PNU-89843) is a sedative drug which acts as an agonist at GABA_{A} receptors, specifically acting as a positive allosteric modulator selective for the α1, α3 and α6 subtypes. It has sedative effects in animals but without causing ataxia, and also acts as an antioxidant and may have neuroprotective effects. It was developed by a team at Upjohn in the 1990s.
