= C21H26N4O2 =

The molecular formula C_{21}H_{26}N_{4}O_{2} may refer to:

- DPA-713
- Ergovalide
- Linaprazan
- Menitazene
