= C17H13ClN4 =

The molecular formula C_{17}H_{13}ClN_{4} (molar mass: 308.76 g/mol, exact mass: 308.0829 u) may refer to:

- Alprazolam
- 4'-Chlorodeschloroalprazolam
- Liarozole
