= C21H19ClN4O2 =

The molecular formula C_{21}H_{19}ClN_{4}O_{2} (molar mass: 394.86 g/mol) may refer to:

- SB-242084
- Setanaxib
- SSR-180,575
