= Chlorodiazepam =

Chlorodiazepam may refer to:

- Diclazepam, or 2'-Chlorodiazepam, a benzodiazepine designer drug with typical sedative and anxiolytic effects
- Ro5-4864, or 4'-Chlorodiazepam, an atypical benzodiazepine derivative with sedative yet also convulsant and anxiogenic effects
