= GML-1 =

Chemical compound

Identifiers
- IUPAC name: N-benzyl-N-methyl-1-phenylpyrrolo[1,2-a]pyrazine-3-carboxamide
- CAS Number: 1772608-75-9
- PubChem CID: 122393153
- ChemSpider: 67166536

Chemical and physical data
- Formula: C_{22}H_{19}N_{3}O
- Molar mass: 341.414 g·mol^{−1}
- 3D model (JSmol): Interactive image
- SMILES: CN(CC1=CC=CC=C1)C(=O)C2=CN3C=CC=C3C(=N2)C4=CC=CC=C4
- InChI: InChI=1S/C22H19N3O/c1-24(15-17-9-4-2-5-10-17)22(26)19-16-25-14-8-13-20(25)21(23-19)18-11-6-3-7-12-18/h2-14,16H,15H2,1H3; Key:QFYYHTVZHIEVCW-UHFFFAOYSA-N

GML-1 is a TSPO (peripheral benzodiazepine receptor) ligand with anxiolytic activity. Its binding affinity (Ki value) to TSPO is comparable with PK11195. GML-1 is selective for TSPO versus the central benzodiazepine receptor (CBR, GABAA receptor). The compound GML-1 was the most active of a series of 1-arylpyrrolo[1,2-a]pyrazine-3-carboxamides, and its anxiolytic effects were examined using the open field test (OFT) and the elevated plus maze (EPM) test. The EPM test is a general anxiety test measuring the time spent by animals in the open or the enclosed arms. When compound was administered to CD-1 mice at the dose of 1.0 mg/kg, it significantly increased the percentage of open arm entries and the time spent in the open arms. GML-1 is a potential antianxiety agent.

The TSPO-mechanism of anxiolytic action of GML-1 was proved by inhibitor analysis with TSPO antagonist PK11195 that blocks effect of GML-1.

The involvement of neurosteroids in the mechanism of action of GML-1 was confirmed by co-administration of GML-1 with neurosteroid synthesis inhibitors. The anxiolytic effect of GML-1 in elevated plus-maze tests was completely blocked by the neurosteroidogenic-enzyme inhibitors trilostane and finasteride.

The tablet dosage form of GML-1 was developed and showed pronounced anxiolytic activity after intragastric administration in rats in a wide range of doses.
