= C22H27FN4O2 =

The molecular formula C_{22}H_{27}FN_{4}O_{2} (molar mass: 398.47 g/mol) may refer to:

- DPA-714, or N,N-diethyl-2-[4-(2-fluoroethoxy)phenyl]-5,7-dimethylpyrazolo[1,5-a]pyrimidine-3-acetamide
- Sunitinib
