= Neonatal stroke =

Neonatal stroke, similar to a stroke that occurs in adults, is defined as a disturbance to the blood supply of the developing brain in the first 28 days of life. This description includes both ischemic events, which result from a blockage of vessels, and hypoxic events, which result from a lack of oxygen to the brain tissue, as well as some combination of the two. One treatment with some proven benefits is hypothermia, but it may be most beneficial in conjunction with pharmacological agents. Well-designed clinical trials for stroke treatment in neonates are lacking, but some current studies involve the transplantation of neural stem cells and umbilical cord stem cells; it is not yet known if this therapy is likely to be successful.

Neonatal strokes may lead to cerebral palsy, learning difficulties, or other disabilities. A neonatal stroke occurs in approximately 1 in 4000 births, but is likely much higher due to the lack of noticeable symptoms.

== Presentation ==
A neonatal stroke is one that occurs in the first 28 days of life, though a late presentation is not uncommon (as contrasted with perinatal stroke, which occurs from 28 weeks of gestation through the first 7 days of life). 80% of neonatal strokes are ischemic, and their presentation is varied, making diagnosis very difficult. The most common manifestation of neonatal strokes is seizures, but other manifestations include lethargy, hypotonia, apnoea, and hemiparesis. Seizures can be focal or generalized in nature. Stroke accounts for about 10% of seizures in term neonates.

Disorders that Increase Risk of Neonatal Stroke
Type of Disorder	Disorder
Maternal:	Autoimmune disorders; Coagulation disorders; Prenatal cocaine exposure; Congenital heart disease; Diabetes; Trauma
Placental:	Placental thrombosis; Placental abruption; Placental infection; Chorioamnionitis
Blood, Homocysteine, and Lipid:	Polycythemia; Disseminated intravascular coagulopathy; Prothrombin mutation; Lipoprotein (a) deficiency; Factor VIII deficiency; Factor V Leiden mutation
Other Infectious:	Central nervous system (CNS) infection; Systemic infection

== Risk factors ==
Many different risk factors play a role in causing a neonatal stroke. Some maternal disorders that may contribute to neonatal strokes include: autoimmune disorders, coagulation disorders, prenatal cocaine exposure, infection, congenital heart disease, diabetes, and trauma. Placental disorders that increase the risk of stroke include placental thrombosis, placental abruption, placental infection, and chorioamnionitis. Other disorders that may increase the risk of a neonatal stroke are blood, homocysteine, and lipid disorders, such as polycythemia, disseminated intravascular coagulopathy, prothrombin mutation, lipoprotein (a) deficiency, factor VIII deficiency (hemophilia A), and factor V Leiden mutation. Infectious disorders such as central nervous system (CNS) infection or systemic infection may also contribute.

Many infants who have a neonatal stroke also follow an uncomplicated pregnancy and delivery without identifiable risk factors, which exemplifies the necessity for further research on this subject.

== Mechanism ==
A neonatal stroke in the developing brain involves excitotoxicity, oxidative stress, and inflammation, which accelerate cell death through necrosis or apoptosis, depending on the region of the brain and severity of stroke. The pathophysiology of neonatal stroke may include thrombosis and thrombolysis, and vascular reactivity. Apoptosis mechanisms may have a more prominent role in developing an ischemic brain injury in neonatal humans than in adult brain ischemia, as a majority of cells die in the environment where edema develops after a neonatal stroke. There is an increased inflammatory response after hypoxia-ischemia, which corresponds to extensive neuronal apoptosis. Apoptosis involves the mitochondrial release of cytochrome c and apoptosis-inducing factor (AIF), which activate caspase-dependent and independent execution pathways, respectively. Injury may also occur due to O_{2} accumulation via the production of O_{2} by microglia, a type of glial cell that is responsible for immune response in the CNS, but their role in injury after neonatal stroke is still relatively unknown. As observed by Alberi, et al., progressive atrophy in the ipsilateral hemisphere over three weeks after the stroke occurred, suggesting that a neonatal stroke has long-lasting effects on neuronal viability and the potential for a prolonged therapeutic window for alleviating the progression of cell death.

== Diagnosis ==
Neonatal strokes occur in approximately 1 in 4000 births, but this number is likely much higher due to the lack of noticeable symptoms at the time of birth. They generally present with seizures, but only half to three-quarters of cases have identifiable causes. Diagnosis often occurs around 36 hours after the onset of neonatal stroke due to the interval between stroke and clinical presentation, if any occurs at all. Neonatal strokes can be confirmed with neuroimaging or neuropathological studies, and other various imaging techniques can be used to diagnose neonatal strokes, such as ultrasound, Doppler sonography, computerized tomography (CT) scan, CT angiography, and multimodal MR.

== Prevention ==
Some evidence suggests that magnesium sulfate administered to mothers prior to early preterm birth reduces the risk of cerebral palsy in surviving neonates. Due to the risk of adverse effects treatments may have, it is unlikely that treatments to prevent neonatal strokes or other hypoxic events would be given routinely to pregnant women without evidence that their fetus was at extreme risk or has already sustained an injury or stroke. This approach might be more acceptable if the pharmacologic agents were endogenously occurring substances (those that occur naturally in an organism), such as creatine or melatonin, with no adverse side-effects. Because of the period of high neuronal plasticity in the months after birth, it may be possible to improve the neuronal environment immediately after birth in neonates considered to be at risk of neonatal stroke. This may be done by enhancing the growth of axons and dendrites, synaptogenesis, and myelination of axons with systemic injections of neurotrophins or growth factors which can cross the blood–brain barrier.

== Treatment ==
Treatment remains controversial with regard to the risk/benefit ratio, which differs significantly from the treatment of stroke in adults. Presence or possibility of organ or limb impairment and bleeding risks are possible with treatments using antithrombotic agents.

=== Therapeutic hypothermia ===
Hypothermia treatment induced by head cooling or systemic cooling administered within six hours of birth for 72 hours has proven beneficial in reducing death and neurological impairments at 18 months of age. This treatment does not completely protect the injured brain and may not reduce the risk of death in the most severely hypoxic-ischemic neonates, and has also not been proven beneficial in preterm infants. Combined therapies of hypothermia and pharmacological agents or growth factors to improve neurological outcomes are most likely the next direction for damaged neonatal brains, such as after a stroke.

=== Other treatments ===
A successful use of urokinase in a newborn with an aortic clot has been reported, but the bleeding risks associated with thrombolytic agents are still unclear.

Heparin, an anticoagulant, treatments have been used in cases of cerebro-venous sinus thrombosis (CVST) in order to stop thrombosis extension and recurrence, to induce thrombosis resolution, and to prevent further brain damage. In the case of extremely high intracranial pressure, surgical removal of the hematoma may be beneficial.

== Prognosis ==
Of the infants that survive, there may be as many as 1 million a year that develop cerebral palsy, learning difficulties, or other disabilities. Cerebral palsy is the most common physical disability in childhood, and it is characterized by a lack of control of movement. Other neurological defects that can occur after a neonatal stroke include hemiparesis and hemi-sensory impairments. Some studies suggest that when tested as toddlers and preschoolers, children who previously had neonatal strokes fall within normal ranges of cognitive development. Less is known about longer-term cognitive outcome, but there has been evidence that cognitive deficits may emerge later in childhood when more complex cognitive processes are expected to develop.

== Research direction ==
Well-designed clinical trials for stroke treatment in neonates are lacking. Recent clinical trials show that therapeutic intervention by brain cooling beginning up to six hours after perinatal asphyxia reduces cerebral injury and may improve outcome in term infants, indicating cell death is both delayed and preventable.

Pancaspase inhibition and Casp3-selective inhibition have been found to be neuroprotective in neonatal rodents with models of neonatal brain injury, which may lead to pharmacological intervention. In a study done by Chauvier, et al., it is suggested that a Caspase inhibitor, TRP601, is a candidate for neuroprotective strategy in prenatal brain injury conditions. They found a lack of detectable side effects in newborn rodents and dogs. This may be a useful treatment in combination with hypothermia.

MRI has proven valuable for defining brain injury in the neonate, but animal models are still needed to identify causative mechanisms and to develop neuroprotective therapies. In order to model human fetal or neonatal brain injury, one needs a species in which a similar proportion of brain development occurs in utero, the volume of white to grey matter is similar to the human brain, an insult can be delivered at an equivalent stage of development, the physiological outcome of the insult can be monitored, and neurobehavioral parameters can be tested. Some animals that meet these criteria are sheep, non-human primates, rabbits, spiny mice, and guinea pigs.

Transplantation of neural stem cells and umbilical cord stem cells is currently being trialed in neonatal brain injury, but it is not yet known if this therapy is likely to be successful.
