= DAA-1097 =

Chemical compound

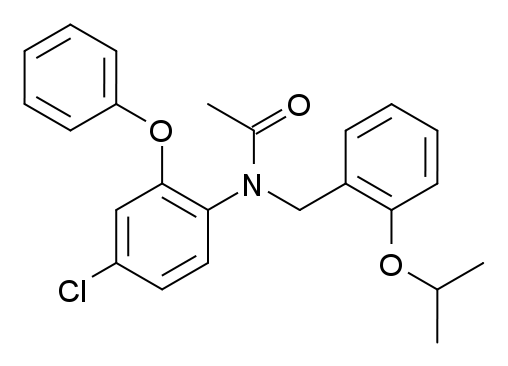

Identifiers
- IUPAC name: N-(4-chloro-2-phenoxyphenyl)-N-(2-isopropoxybenzyl)acetamide
- CAS Number: 220551-79-1
- PubChem CID: 9844410
- ChemSpider: 8020125
- UNII: TE4VJ6U6XS
- CompTox Dashboard (EPA): DTXSID10431725

Chemical and physical data
- Formula: C_{24}H_{24}ClNO_{3}
- Molar mass: 409.91 g·mol^{−1}
- 3D model (JSmol): Interactive image
- SMILES: CC(C)Oc2ccccc2CN(C(=O)C)c1ccc(Cl)cc1Oc3ccccc3
- InChI: InChI=1S/C24H24ClNO3/c1-17(2)28-23-12-8-7-9-19(23)16-26(18(3)27)22-14-13-20(25)15-24(22)29-21-10-5-4-6-11-21/h4-15,17H,16H2,1-3H3; Key:CGUBOFYHGYNUDL-UHFFFAOYSA-N

DAA-1097 is a drug which acts as a potent and selective agonist at the peripheral benzodiazepine receptor.

It is also known as the mitochondrial 18 kDa translocator protein or TSPO, but with no affinity at central benzodiazepine receptors.

It has anxiolytic effects in animal studies.
