= Etifoxine =

Anxiolytic medication

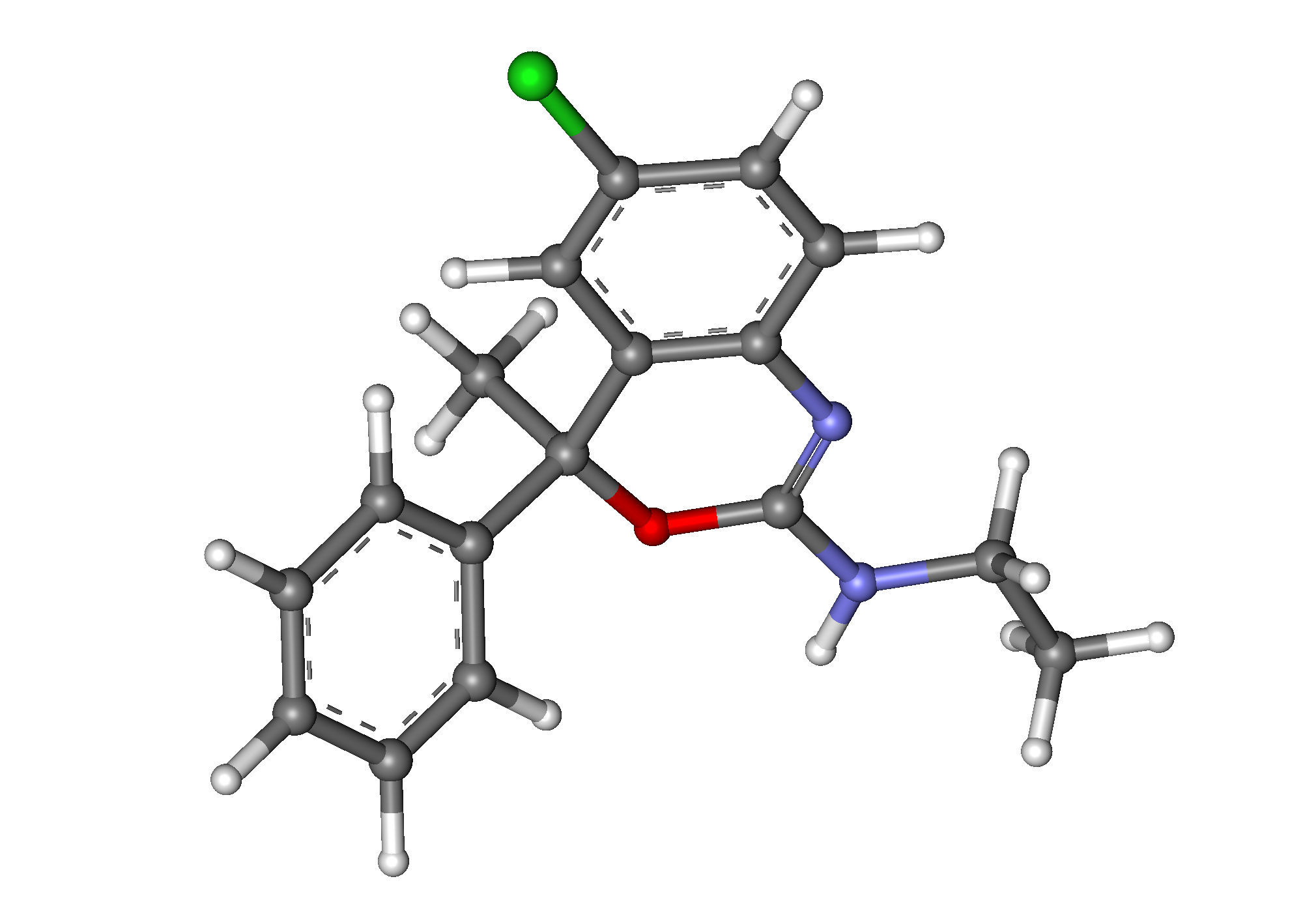

Clinical data
- Trade names: Stresam
- Other names: Étifoxine; Etifoxin; Etafenoxine; Etafenoxin; EFX; Hoe 36801; Hoe-36,801
- AHFS/Drugs.com: International Drug Names
- Pregnancy category: Not recommended
- Routes of administration: Oral administration
- ATC code: N05BX03 (WHO)

Legal status
- Legal status: In general: ℞ (Prescription only)

Pharmacokinetic data
- Bioavailability: 90%
- Protein binding: 88–95%
- Metabolism: Liver
- Metabolites: Several (including diethyletifoxine)
- Elimination half-life: Etifoxine: 6 hours Diethyletifoxine: 20 hours
- Excretion: Mainly urine, also bile

Identifiers
- IUPAC name: 6-Chloro-N-ethyl-4-methyl-4-phenyl-4H-benzo[d][1,3]oxazin-2-amine
- CAS Number: 21715-46-8 56776-32-0 (hydrochloride)
- PubChem CID: 30768
- IUPHAR/BPS: 5468
- DrugBank: DB08986
- ChemSpider: 28547
- UNII: X24X82MX4X
- KEGG: D07320
- ChEMBL: ChEMBL2106227
- CompTox Dashboard (EPA): DTXSID00865010
- ECHA InfoCard: 100.158.584

Chemical and physical data
- Formula: C_{17}H_{17}ClN_{2}O
- Molar mass: 300.79 g·mol^{−1}
- 3D model (JSmol): Interactive image
- SMILES: ClC1=CC=C2N=C(NCC)OC(C3=CC=CC=C3)(C)C2=C1
- InChI: InChI=1S/C17H17ClN2O/c1-3-19-16-20-15-10-9-13(18)11-14(15)17(2,21-16)12-7-5-4-6-8-12/h4-11H,3H2,1-2H3,(H,19,20); Key:IBYCYJFUEJQSMK-UHFFFAOYSA-N

Etifoxine, sold under the trade name Stresam among others, is a nonbenzodiazepine anxiolytic agent, primarily indicated for short-term management of adjustment disorder, specifically instances of situational depression accompanied by anxiety, such as stress-induced anxiety. Administration is by mouth. Side effects associated with etifoxine use include slight drowsiness, headache, skin eruptions, and allergic reactions. In rare cases, etifoxine has been linked to severe skin and liver toxicity, as well as menstrual bleeding between periods. Unlike benzodiazepines, etifoxine does not cause sedation or lack of coordination. Etifoxine acts as a ligand for translocator proteins.

Etifoxine was developed in the 1960s and was introduced for medical use in France in 1979. Its marketed in 53 countries worldwide, although it remains unavailable in the United States. Throughout the 2010s and early 2020s, the safety profile of etifoxine was scrutinized within France and the European Union, prompted by reports of toxicity. The investigation revealed that instances of toxicity were infrequent, and etifoxine was allowed to remain on the market.

== Medical uses ==
As of 2022, across the European countries where etifoxine has been approved (including France, Luxembourg, Malta, Romania and Bulgaria), the main approved indication is for the treatment of the psychosomatic manifestations of anxiety.

When etifoxine was first approved in France in 1979, the original indication was for the treatment of "psychosomatic manifestations of anxiety, for instance autonomic dystonia, particularly with cardiovascular expression".

Over time, the indication for etifoxine has been more formalized as the treatment of adjustment disorder (situational depression) with anxiety (ADWA) (for example, stress-related anxiety). Etifoxine has been found to reduce scores on the Hamilton Anxiety Rating Scale (HAM‑A) in people with adjustment disorder with anxiety by approximately 50 to 75% after 4 weeks of treatment in clinical trials (as per the AMETIS, ETILOR, ETIZAL, STRETI studies). The medication is similarly effective or more effective than benzodiazepines like lorazepam, alprazolam, and clonazepam and more effective than buspirone for adjustment disorder with anxiety on the basis of directly comparative randomized controlled trials. However, in the AMETIS study, both etifoxine and lorazepam failed to show greater effectiveness over placebo.

In the trials comparing etifoxine to clonazepam, lorazepam, and alprazolam, total daily doses of the benzodiazepines were limited to their maintenance daily dose, set at 1 mg clonazepam, 2 mg lorazepam, and 1.5 mg alprazolam, divided across 3 doses per day. Such an inflexible dosing regime limits the utility benzodiazepines offer in practice; e.g. lorazepam and alprazolam can be used as needed for situational anxiety in which continuous use is unnecessary or excessive, while clonazepam can be titrated to response when continuous relief is indicated, up to a maximum of 4 mg a day, four times greater than the dose used in comparison with etifoxine over the 24 week duration of the trial. In general, they offer a degree of personalization that is not possible with etifoxine. Indeed, better evidence is required before etifoxine can be said to replace benzodiazepines in practice, especially considering the trials above were relatively small in size, along with the high attrition rates and lack of personalization of the benzodiazepines used.

The usual dosage of etifoxine (as the hydrochloride salt) is 150 to 200 mg per day in divided doses of 50 to 100 mg two to three times per day (e.g., 50 mg–50 mg–100 mg). It is taken for a few days to a few weeks, but no longer than 12 weeks.

=== Available forms ===
Etifoxine is provided in the form of oral capsules containing 50 mg etifoxine hydrochloride.

== Contraindications ==
Etifoxine is contraindicated in people with circulatory shock, severe liver impairment, severe kidney impairment, myasthenia gravis, galactosemia (due to lactose in the drug formulation), severe respiratory failure, and hypersensitivity (allergy) to etifoxine. The medication is not recommended in children or adolescents under the age of 18 and is not recommended during pregnancy and breastfeeding due to insufficient data. Caution is warranted with regard to combining etifoxine and other central depressants such as benzodiazepines, central analgesics, antipsychotics, sedative antihistamines, and alcohol.

== Side effects ==
Side effects of etifoxine include slight drowsiness and headache. Rarely, etifoxine can cause benign skin eruptions or rashes and allergic reactions such as hives and angioedema. Etifoxine shows less adverse effects of anterograde amnesia, sedation, impaired psychomotor performance, and withdrawal syndromes than those of benzodiazepines. No cases of misuse or dependence with etifoxine were identified in a French pharmacovigilance survey, which is also in contrast to benzodiazepines.

Etifoxine has been associated rarely with cases of severe dermal toxicity and liver toxicity. Skin and subcutaneous disorders are the most frequently reported, but these generally resolve after drug cessation. A 2012 review of etifoxine by the French National Pharmacovigilance Committee determined that etifoxine was safe and continued to provide a favorable alternative to benzodiazepine anxiolytics. The committee found (for a ten-year pharmacovigilance period) that safety concerns were rare or very rare and that the incidence of idiosyncratic hepatic (liver) problems were very rare.

== Pharmacology ==
=== Pharmacodynamics ===
Unlike benzodiazepines, etifoxine may produce its anxiolytic effects through a dual mechanism, by directly binding to GABA_{A} receptors and (purportedly, exact binding site undetermined) to the mitochondrial translocator protein (TSPO). This results in stimulation of the biosynthesis of endogenous neurosteroids, for instance allopregnanolone, a highly potent GABA_{A} receptor positive allosteric modulator.

At GABA_{A} receptors etifoxine binds at the α+β− interface and preferentially potentiates α_{2}β_{3}γ_{2} and α_{3}β_{3}γ_{2} receptor types. This direct allosteric potentiation can only be observed at relatively high concentrations (starting at >1 mM) and is perhaps not physiologically relevant at normal human doses. This is different from benzodiazepines and etifoxine can be used alongside benzodiazepines to potentiate their effects without competing for binding sites; however, it also means that the direct effects of etifoxine are not reversed by the benzodiazepine antagonist flumazenil.

=== Pharmacokinetics ===
Etifoxine is taken via oral administration. It is rapidly absorbed from the gastrointestinal tract. It is well-absorbed, with a bioavailability of 90%. The time to peak levels of etifoxine is 2 to 3 hours. The plasma protein binding of etifoxine is 88 to 95%. It does not bind to blood cells. The drug is known to cross the placental barrier. Etifoxine is metabolized in the liver into several metabolites. One of these metabolites, diethyletifoxine, is pharmacologically active. The elimination half-life of etifoxine is 6 hours and of diethyletifoxine is almost 20 hours. Etifoxine is eliminated in three phases. The drug is excreted mainly in urine in the form of metabolites. It is also excreted in bile. Only small amounts are excreted unchanged.

== Chemistry ==
Etifoxine is a nonbenzodiazepine—that is, it is similarly a GABA_{A} receptor positive allosteric modulator but its chemical structure is distinct from that of benzodiazepines. Instead, it is a benzoxazine derivative.

Etifoxine and chlordiazepoxide skeletal formulae with differences highlighted in orange.

Etifoxine is used pharmaceutically as the hydrochloride salt.

(S)-Etifoxine, the (S) enantiomer of etifoxine, was under development by Anvyl Pharmaceuticals for the treatment of neuropathic pain, but development was discontinued. A deuterated form of etifoxine with improved pharmacokinetics known as deuterated etifoxine (GRX-917) is under development by GABA Therapeutics for the treatment anxiety and mood disorders.

== History ==
Etifoxine was developed by Hoechst in the 1960s. It was introduced for medical use in France in 1979. Since at least 2000, etifoxine has been marketed by the French pharmaceutical company Biocodex. Following reports of post-marketing toxicity, the safety of etifoxine was reassessed by the French government and the European Medicines Agency (EMA). In January 2022, the EMA "finalized its review of Stresam and concluded that the medicine can continue to be used for the treatment of anxiety disorders, but it must not be used in patients who previously had severe skin reactions or severe liver problems after taking etifoxine."

== Society and culture ==
=== Names ===
Etifoxine is the generic name of the drug and its INN, BAN, and DCF. It is also known by the older and much-lesser-used synonym etafenoxine and by its developmental code name Hoe 36801. Etifoxine is marketed under the brand name Stresam. It has also been marketed under the brand name Strezam.

=== Availability ===
Etifoxine has been marketed in 53 countries as of 2022. Some of the countries in which etifoxine has been marketed include Russia, Argentina, Bulgaria, Chile, France, Luxembourg, Malta, Romania, South Africa, Thailand and Ukraine. Etifoxine is not approved for use by the United States Food and Drug Administration (FDA) or the European Medicines Agency (EMA) of the European Union, and hence is not marketed in these regions. However, etifoxine is marketed in five European Union member states (France, Bulgaria, Luxembourg, Malta, Romania) Russia and Ukraine

== See also ==
- Alpidem
