= Emapunil =

Chemical compound

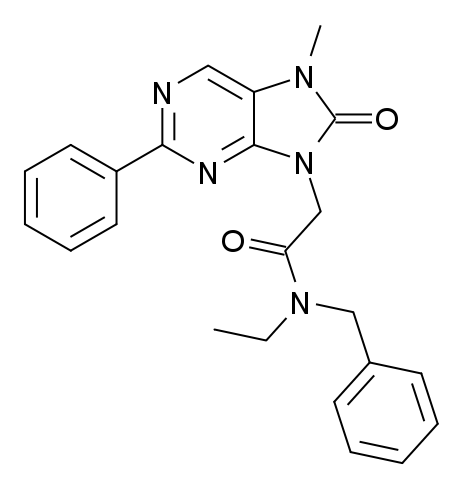

Clinical data
- ATC code: none

Identifiers
- IUPAC name: N-benzyl-N-ethyl-2-(7-methyl-8-oxo-2-phenylpurin-9-yl)acetamide
- CAS Number: 226954-04-7
- PubChem CID: 6433109
- ChemSpider: 4938297
- UNII: OG837L732J
- ChEMBL: ChEMBL513922
- CompTox Dashboard (EPA): DTXSID40177220

Chemical and physical data
- Formula: C_{23}H_{23}N_{5}O_{2}
- Molar mass: 401.470 g·mol^{−1}
- 3D model (JSmol): Interactive image
- SMILES: CCN(Cc1ccccc1)C(=O)Cn2c3c(cnc(n3)c4ccccc4)n(c2=O)C
- InChI: InChI=1S/C23H23N5O2/c1-3-27(15-17-10-6-4-7-11-17)20(29)16-28-22-19(26(2)23(28)30)14-24-21(25-22)18-12-8-5-9-13-18/h4-14H,3,15-16H2,1-2H3; Key:NBMBIEOUVBHEBM-UHFFFAOYSA-N

Emapunil (AC-5216, XBD-173) is an anxiolytic drug which acts as a selective agonist at the peripheral benzodiazepine receptor, also known as the mitochondrial 18 kDa translocator protein or TSPO. This protein has multiple functions, among which is regulation of steroidogenesis, particularly the production of neuroactive steroids such as allopregnanolone in the brain. In both animal and human trials, emapunil produced fast acting anxiolytic and anti-panic effects, without producing sedation or withdrawal symptoms following cessation of use. Emapunil is also used in its ^{11}C radiolabelled form to map the distribution of TSPO receptors in the brain.

== See also ==
- SSR-180,575
