= SSR-180,575 =

Chemical compound

Clinical data
- ATC code: None

Identifiers
- IUPAC name: 7-Chloro-N,N,5-trimethyl-4-oxo-3-phenyl-3,5-dihydro-4H-pyridazino[4,5-b]indole-1-acetamide
- CAS Number: 220448-02-2
- PubChem CID: 9930560
- ChemSpider: 8106191
- UNII: 4K8W47WK2L
- CompTox Dashboard (EPA): DTXSID10433007

Chemical and physical data
- Formula: C_{21}H_{19}ClN_{4}O_{2}
- Molar mass: 394.86 g·mol^{−1}
- 3D model (JSmol): Interactive image
- SMILES: Cn2c3cc(Cl)ccc3c1c2c(=O)n(nc1CC(=O)N(C)C)-c4ccccc4
- InChI: InChI=1S/C21H19ClN4O2/c1-24(2)18(27)12-16-19-15-10-9-13(22)11-17(15)25(3)20(19)21(28)26(23-16)14-7-5-4-6-8-14/h4-11H,12H2,1-3H3; Key:HJSQVJOROCIILI-UHFFFAOYSA-N

SSR-180,575 is a drug which acts as a selective agonist at the peripheral benzodiazepine receptor, also known as the mitochondrial 18 kDa translocator protein or TSPO. It has been shown to have neuroprotective and cardioprotective effects and to stimulate steroidogenesis of pregnenolone in the brain, which may be linked to its neuroprotective action.

== See also ==
- Emapunil
