= Deuterated etifoxine =

Chemical compound

Clinical data
- Other names: Etifoxine deuterated; GRX-917
- Routes of administration: Oral administration
- Drug class: GABA_{A} receptor positive allosteric modulator; TSPO ligand

Deuterated etifoxine (developmental code name GRX-917) is a deuterated drug which is under development for the treatment of anxiety disorders and mood disorders.

== Drug development ==
It was originated by GABA Therapeutics and is under development by GABA Therapeutics and ATAI Life Sciences.

== Chemistry ==
Deuterated etifoxine is a deuterated form of etifoxine (Stresam) with improved pharmacokinetic properties, for instance a longer elimination half-life and duration of action. Etifoxine has been widely used as an anxiolytic for many decades.

== Biology ==
Etifoxine and deuterated etifoxine are GABA_{A} receptor positive allosteric modulators (GABAkines) and ligands of the translocator protein (TSPO), both of which may contribute to anxiolytic effects. The TSPO promotes steroidogenesis of inhibitory neurosteroids such as allopregnanolone, which act as potent GABA_{A} receptor positive allosteric modulators, and hence interactions with the TSPO can also indirectly potentiate the GABA_{A} receptor. The precise isotopic substitution of deuterated etifoxine has not yet been disclosed. As of January 2023, deuterated etifoxine is in phase 1 clinical trials for anxiety disorders and preclinical development for mood disorders.

== See also ==
- List of investigational anxiolytics
