= Tryptophan-rich sensory protein =

TspO_MBR

Identifiers
- Symbol: TspO_MBR
- Pfam: PF03073
- InterPro: IPR004307
- TCDB: Manning Peyton Manning
- CDD: cd15904
Available protein structures:
- PDB: IPR004307 PF03073 (ECOD; PDBsum)
- AlphaFold: IPR004307; PF03073

Tryptophan-rich sensory proteins (TspO) are a family of proteins that are involved in transmembrane signalling. In either prokaryotes or mitochondria they are localized to the outer membrane, and have been shown to bind and transport dicarboxylic tetrapyrrole intermediates of the haem biosynthetic pathway. They are associated with the major outer membrane porins (in prokaryotes) and with the voltage-dependent anion channel (in mitochondria).

TspO of Rhodobacter sphaeroides is involved in signal transduction, functioning as a negative regulator of the expression of some photosynthesis genes (PpsR/AppA repressor/antirepressor regulon). This down-regulation is believed to be in response to oxygen levels. TspO works through (or modulates) the PpsR/AppA system and acts upstream of the site of action of these regulatory proteins. It has been suggested that the TspO regulatory pathway works by regulating the efflux of certain tetrapyrrole intermediates of the haem/bacteriochlorophyll biosynthetic pathways in response to the availability of molecular oxygen, thereby causing the accumulation of a biosynthetic intermediate that serves as a corepressor for the regulated genes. A homologue of the TspO protein in Sinorhizobium meliloti is involved in regulating expression of the ndi locus in response to stress conditions.

In animals, the peripheral benzodiazepine receptor is a mitochondrial protein (located in the outer mitochondrial membrane) characterised by its ability to bind with nanomolar affinity to a variety of benzodiazepine-like drugs, as well as to dicarboxylic tetrapyrrole intermediates of the haem biosynthetic pathway. Depending upon the tissue, it was shown to be involved in steroidogenesis, haem biosynthesis, apoptosis, cell growth and differentiation, mitochondrial respiratory control, and immune and stress response, but the precise function of the PBR remains unclear. The role of PBR in the regulation of cholesterol transport from the outer to the inner mitochondrial membrane, the rate-determining step in steroid biosynthesis, has been studied in detail. PBR is required for the binding, uptake and release, upon ligand activation, of the substrate cholesterol. PBR forms a multimeric complex with the voltage-dependent anion channel (VDAC) and adenine nucleotide carrier. Molecular modeling of PBR suggested that it might function as a channel for cholesterol. Indeed, cholesterol uptake and transport by bacterial cells was induced upon PBR expression. Mutagenesis studies identified a cholesterol recognition/interaction motif (CRAC) in the cytoplasmic C terminus of PBR.

In complementation experiments, rat PBR (pk18) protein functionally substitutes for its homologue TspO in R. sphaeroides, negatively affecting transcription of specific photosynthesis genes. This suggests that PBR may function as an oxygen sensor, transducing an oxygen-triggered signal leading to an adaptive cellular response.

These observations suggest that fundamental aspects of this receptor and the downstream signal transduction pathway are conserved in bacteria and higher eukaryotic mitochondria. The alpha-3 subdivision of the purple bacteria is considered to be a likely source of the endosymbiont that ultimately gave rise to the mitochondrion. Therefore, it is possible that the mammalian PBR remains both evolutionarily and functionally related to the TspO of R. sphaeroides.
