= 4'-Chlorodeschloroalprazolam =

Chemical compound

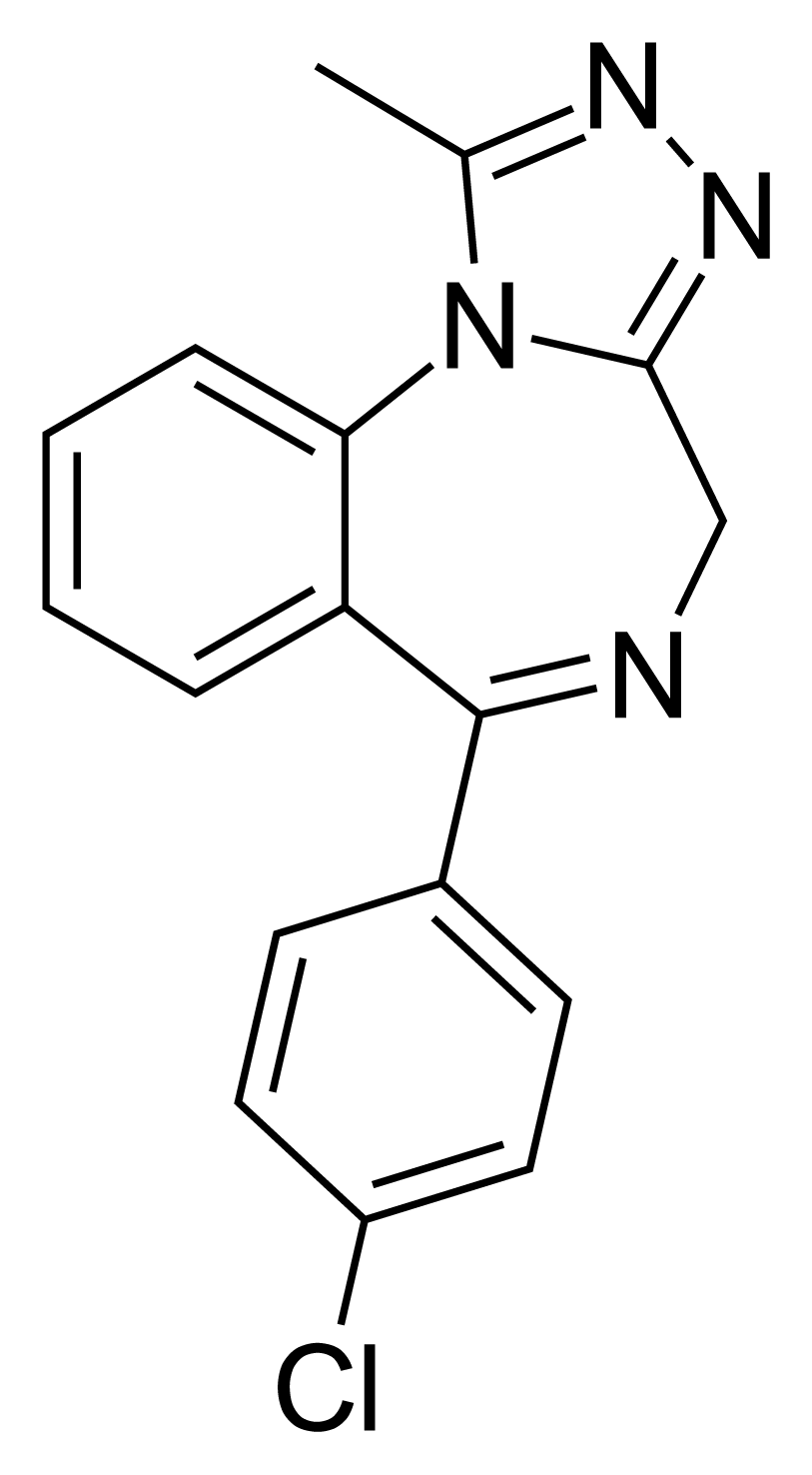

Identifiers
- IUPAC name: 6-(4-chlorophenyl)-1-methyl-4H-[1,2,4]triazolo[4,3-a][1,4]benzodiazepine
- CAS Number: 92262-72-1
- PubChem CID: 142641556
- ChemSpider: 114951958
- ChEMBL: ChEMBL5278599
- CompTox Dashboard (EPA): DTXSID301351782

Chemical and physical data
- Formula: C_{17}H_{13}ClN_{4}
- Molar mass: 308.77 g·mol^{−1}
- 3D model (JSmol): Interactive image
- SMILES: CC1=NN=C2N1C3=CC=CC=C3C(=NC2)C4=CC=C(C=C4)Cl
- InChI: InChI=1S/C17H13ClN4/c1-11-20-21-16-10-19-17(12-6-8-13(18)9-7-12)14-4-2-3-5-15(14)22(11)16/h2-9H,10H2,1H3; Key:QZQFCOLCRXZSIK-UHFFFAOYSA-N

4'-Chlorodeschloroalprazolam is a triazolobenzodiazepine derivative which has been sold as a designer drug, presumably with sedative effects, first identified in Australia and the US in 2021, and subsequently in Ireland.

== See also ==
- Alprazolam
- Flualprazolam
- Ro5-4864
- List of benzodiazepines
