= Exerkine =

Signaling molecules induced by exercise that mediate its systemic effects

An exerkine is a signaling molecule released in response to exercise that helps mediate systemic adaptations to exercise.

== Types ==
Exerkines come in many forms, including hormones, metabolites, proteins and nucleic acids; are synthesized and secreted from multiple tissues and cell types; and exert their effects through endocrine, paracrine and/or autocrine pathways. These effects are thought to underlie many health benefits of exercise in terms of enhanced resilience, healthspan, and longevity.

== Exercise endocrinology ==
The study of exerkines is the focus of the field of exercise endocrinology. Though the existence of exerkines were hypothesized as early as the 1960s, the identification of the first exerkine, IL-6, which is secreted from contracting muscles, occurred in 2000. In 2012 another exerkine, irisin, was discovered and reported to be involved in the regulation of energy expenditure, attracting significant scientific and public attention. Thousands of potential exerkines have been proposed, although few have been studied in depth.

== Etymology ==
'Exerkine' was coined in 2016 by Mark Tarnopolsky and colleagues, based on a portmanteau of 'exercise' and κίνησις (kínēsis, Ancient Greek for 'movement').

== See also ==
- Neurobiological effects of physical exercise
