= Behavioral plasticity =

Psychological concept

Behavioral plasticity is the change in an organism's behavior that results from exposure to stimuli, such as changing environmental conditions. Behavior can change more rapidly in response to changes in internal or external stimuli than is the case for most morphological traits and many physiological traits. As a result, when organisms are confronted by new conditions, behavioral changes often occur in advance of physiological or morphological changes. For instance, larval amphibians changed their antipredator behavior within an hour after a change in cues from predators, but morphological changes in body and tail shape in response to the same cues required a week to complete.

== Background ==
For many years, ethologists have studied the ways that behavior can change in response to changes in external stimuli or changes in the internal state of an organism. In a parallel literature, psychologists studying learning and cognition have spent years documenting the many ways that experiences in the past can affect the behavior an individual expresses at the current time. Interest in behavioral plasticity gained prominence more recently as an example of a type of phenotypic plasticity with major consequences for evolutionary biology.

== Types ==
Behavioral plasticity can be broadly organized into two types: exogenous and endogenous. Exogenous plasticity refers to the changes in behavioral phenotype (i.e., observable behaviors) caused by an external stimulus, experience, or environment. Endogenous plasticity encompasses plastic responses that result from changes in internal cues, such as genotype, circadian rhythms, and menstruation.

These two broad categories can be further broken down into two other important classifications. When an external stimulus elicits or "activates" an immediate response (an immediate effect on behavior), then the organism is demonstrating contextual plasticity. This form of plasticity highlights the concept that external stimuli in a given context activate neural and hormonal mechanisms or pathways which already exist inside the organism. In contrast, if an organism's current behavior is altered by past experiences, then the animal is said to be exhibiting developmental or "innate" behavioral plasticity. This form of plasticity is generally thought to require new neuronal pathways to form.

Developmental behavioral plasticity corresponds to the commonly used definition of plasticity: a single genotype can express more than one behavioral phenotype as a result of different developmental routes triggered by differences in past experiences. Developmental plasticity thus includes what is referred to as "learning". However, developmental plasticity also includes developmental changes in morphology and physiology relevant to a particular behavior, such as changes in muscles, limbs, or bones that influence foraging or locomotion throughout and organism's life.

A major difference between developmental and contextual plasticity is the inherent trade-off between the time of interpreting a stimulus and exhibiting a behavior. Contextual plasticity is a near immediate response to the environment. The underlying hormonal networks/neuronal pathways are already present, so it is only a matter of activating them. In contrast, developmental plasticity requires internal changes in hormonal networks and neuronal pathways. As a result, developmental plasticity is often, although not always, a slower process than contextual plasticity. For instance, habituation is a type of learning (developmental plasticity) that can occur within a short period of time. One of the advantages of developmental behavioral plasticity that occurs over extended periods of time is that such changes can occur in concert with changes in morphological and physiological traits. In such cases, the same set of external or internal stimuli can lead to coordinated changes in suites of behavioral, morphological and physiological traits.

== Examples ==
Contextual plasticity is typically studied by presenting the same individual with different external stimuli, and then recording their responses to each stimulus. For instance, ants can rapidly alter their running speed in response to changes in the external temperature. Another example of contextual plasticity occurs when birds change their vocalizations in response to changes in the pitch or intensity of background noise. Contextual plasticity plays a major role in studies of mate preference, in which each subject is exposed to cues from different mates, and its response to each cue is quantified. In this case, a stronger attractive response to a particular cue is assumed to reflect a preference for mates with that cue.

Developmental plasticity encompasses the many ways that experiences in an organism's past can affect its current behavior. Developmental plasticity thus includes learning, acclimation, and any situation in which environmental conditions early in life affects the behavior expressed later in life (also called ontogenetic plasticity. Since a given individual can only be raised under one set of conditions, ontogenetic plasticity is studied by dividing matched individuals into two or more groups, and then rearing each group under a different set of conditions. For instance, this experimental design was used to demonstrate that the density at which moth larvae were raised affected the courtship signals that they produced as adults. Endogenous plasticity includes circadian rhythms, circannual rhythms, and age-dependent changes in behavior. A good example of endogenous plasticity occurs with zebrafish (Danio rerio). Larval zebrafish exhibit circadian rhythms in their responsiveness to light. Even when they are maintained under continuous darkness, the fish are much more responsive to changes in light (i.e. higher contextual plasticity) during subjective day than during subjective night. Another example involves the changes in an individual's behavior and hormonal profile around the time of sexual maturity; such changes are affected changes in physiology that occurred months to years earlier in life.

== Potential vs. realized plasticity ==
A useful distinction to make when looking at behavioral plasticity is between potential and realized plasticity. Potential plasticity refers to the ability of a given phenotypic trait to vary in its response to variation in stimuli, experiences, or environmental conditions. Thus, potential plasticity is the theoretical range in behavioral plasticity that could be expressed. This value is never truly known, but serves more as a baseline in plasticity models. Realized plasticity, on the other hand, refers to the extent to which a given phenotype actually varies in response to changes in a specific stimulus, experience, or environmental condition.

== Individual differences in behavioral plasticity ==
Recent studies of animals have documented individual differences in virtually all of the different types of behavioral plasticities described above. In addition, behavioral plasticities may themselves be developmentally plastic: individual differences in a type of plasticity that is expressed at a given age may be affected by the conditions to which the subjects were exposed earlier in life. In a variety of species, for instance, social cues during the juvenile period affect the contextual plasticity of responses to cues from potential mates at adulthood. As is the case for many other types of plasticity, researchers studying the development of individual differences in behavioral plasticity have found that genes, prior experiences and interactions between these factors contribute to the individual differences in behavioral plasticity that are expressed at a given age or lifestage. Another question that is currently attracting interest from students of both animal and human behavior is whether different types of behavioral plasticities are correlated with one another across individuals: i.e., whether some individuals are generally more plastic than others. Although there is some evidence that certain types of cognitive traits tend to be positively correlated with one another across individuals (see the g factor in humans), at present there is scant evidence that other types of plasticity (e.g. contextual plasticity and ontogenetic plasticity) are correlated with one another across individuals or genotypes in humans or animals.

== Evolutionary causes and consequences ==
Behavioral plasticity can have major impacts on the evolutionary fitness of an individual. Both developmental and contextual plasticity influence the fitness of an animal in a novel environment by increasing the probability that the animal will survive in that environment. Developmental plasticity is particularly important in terms of survival in novel environments, because trial-and-error processes such as learning (which encompass both phenotype sampling and environmental feedback) have the ability to immediately shift an entire population close to a new adaptive norm. As such, the ability to express some level of behavioral plasticity can be very advantageous. In fluctuating environments, animals that can change how they respond to differences in stimuli would have a leg up over animals that were set in a rigid phenotype. However, this would only be the case if the costs of maintaining the ability to change phenotype was lower than the benefit conferred to the individual.

== Neurobiological Basis ==
In order to effectively discuss behavioral plasticity, the biological and neurological mechanisms driving behavioral development and its changes must be established. There are three primary steps to do so as are broken down in the following categories. The first, involves a basic explanation of the principles of neural plasticity as a driver of behavioral plasticity. This involves a discussion of the general neuroplastic qualities our brain possesses that allow us to rapidly alter behavior to adapt to stimuli.

- Long-term potentiation (LTP)
- Dendritic spine remodeling
- Neurogenesis in the hippocampus

Secondarily, is a discussion of the general mechanisms the nervous system uses to integrate and process stimuli, and then behaviorally respond to them.

- Dopamine and reward-based learning
- Serotonin and social or stress-related plasticity
- Cortisol and stress-induced behavioral flexibility
- Gene expression and epigenetic regulation in learning (e.g., CREB, BDNF)

Lastly, we can incorporate these foundations into a discussion of the systemic and regional mechanisms in the brain that modulate overall behavior to create a clearer neurobiological model of the ability of the nervous system to produce behavior of increasing and variable complexity.

- Prefrontal cortex (executive control, behavioral flexibility)
- Amygdala (emotionally driven learning)
- Hippocampus (contextual learning and memory)
- Basal ganglia (habit formation and motor learning)
