= DPA-714 =

Chemical compound

Identifiers
- IUPAC name: N,N-diethyl-2-[4-(2-fluoroethoxy)phenyl]-5,7-dimethylpyrazolo[1,5-a]pyrimidine-3-acetamide
- CAS Number: 958233-07-3
- ChemSpider: 23328478
- UNII: Y1H4D2VKZD
- ChEMBL: ChEMBL512306

Chemical and physical data
- Formula: C_{22}H_{27}FN_{4}O_{2}
- Molar mass: 398.482 g·mol^{−1}
- 3D model (JSmol): Interactive image
- SMILES: CCN(CC)C(=O)Cc1c(nn2c1nc(cc2C)C)c3ccc(cc3)OCCF
- InChI: InChI=1S/C22H27FN4O2/c1-5-26(6-2)20(28)14-19-21(17-7-9-18(10-8-17)29-12-11-23)25-27-16(4)13-15(3)24-22(19)27/h7-10,13H,5-6,11-12,14H2,1-4H3; Key:FLZZFWBNYJNHMY-UHFFFAOYSA-N

DPA-714 or N,N-diethyl-2-[4-(2-fluoroethoxy)phenyl]-5,7-dimethylpyrazolo[1,5-a]pyrimidine-3-acetamide is a selective ligand for the translocator protein (TSPO) currently under evaluation for several clinical applications. For this reason, a practical, multigram synthetic route for its preparation has been described.

The binding affinity of DPA-714 for TSPO is reported as K_{i} = 7.0 ± 0.4 nM.

[^{18}F]DPA-714 is currently under investigation as a potential radiopharmaceutical for imaging TSPO in living systems using positron emission tomography (PET). DPA-714, along with other members of the DPA class of TSPO ligands, has been shown to decrease microglial activation and increase neuronal survival in a quinolinic acid rat model of excitotoxic neurodegeneration, suggesting potential neuroprotective effects.

== See also ==
- DPA-713
