= Arctic Sun medical device =

Targeted temperature management system

The Arctic Sun Temperature Management System is a non-invasive targeted temperature management system. It modulates patient temperature by circulating chilled water in pads directly adhered to the patient's skin. Using varying water temperatures and a computer algorithm, a patient's body temperature can be better controlled. It is produced by Medivance, Inc. of Louisville, Colorado.

== Background ==
Body temperature, which is systematically measured and reported as a vital sign, contributes to maintenance of normal physiology and affects the processes that lead to recovery after illness. Complete and proper functioning of the body is dependent on maintaining a core temperature between 36.5–38.5 °C (97.7–101.3 °F). A core temperature above 41.5 °C, or below 33.5 °C, causes a fast decline in proper functioning of the body and may result in injury or death. Intentional manipulation of body temperature has been studied as a treatment strategy for head injuries since the 1900s. In the 1980s, the use of hypothermia on dogs after cardiac arrest demonstrated positive outcomes, including neurological status and survival. In 2005, the American Heart Association implemented recommendations and guidelines for mild hypothermia in post-resuscitation support after cardiac arrest with return of spontaneous circulation.

One of the most common practices of targeted temperature management is to reduce body temperature to a “mild hypothermic state” (per the AHA guidelines is 33 °C (91.4 °F) for 12–24 hours and then slowly re-warm the body back to normal 37 °C (98.6 °F). The purpose of this is to slow the metabolic processes and the chemical cascade that occurs when the brain goes without oxygen for a period of time. A study conducted in 2002-2004 showed that treatment with therapeutic hypothermia for patients resuscitated after cardiac arrest due to ventricular fibrillation led to a positive outcome (Glasgow-Pittsburgh Cerebral Performance category 1 or 2) in 24 of 43 patients compared to only 11 of 43 patients in the standard resuscitation group where no hypothermia was used in treatment.

Therapeutic hypothermia, which lowers the patient's body temperature to levels between 32–34 °C (90–93 °F), is used to help reduce the risk of the ischemic injury to the brain following a period of insufficient blood flow. Periods of insufficient blood flow may be caused by cardiac arrest, stroke, or brain trauma. Non-invasively induced therapeutic hypothermia has been shown to reduce mortality of successfully resuscitated cardiac arrest victims by 35 percent and increase the chance of a good neurologic outcome by 39 percent.

== Device description ==
The Arctic Sun can be explained as dry water immersion. It is a non-invasive temperature management system that is used to induce hypothermia in comatose patients that have suffered from Sudden Cardiac Arrest (SCA) and patients at risk for ischemic brain damage. Because of the Arctic Sun's noninvasive nature, treatment can be delivered without the host of adverse events associated with invasive procedures such as cooling catheters. The Arctic Sun has adhesive gel pads which stick to a patient's body, and cover only a portion of a patient's body to leave most of the body free for augmenting medical procedures. The device operates under negative pressure and circulates water through the adhesive pads at a temperature between 4–42 °C (39–108 °F). By controlling the temperature of the water running through the gel pads, the Arctic Sun can help regulate a patient's body temperature. Controlled rewarming has been cited in the literature as beneficial in preventing reperfusion injury.

A complaint levied against the Arctic Sun is the risk of skin injury. A study published in 2007 found that the Arctic Sun caused "skin erythema during the cooling period... in almost all patients," but that no pressure ulcers or frostbite was noted.

Invasive cooling catheter companies have claimed that catheters can lower body temperature at a faster rate, which is relevant because most of the clinical data suggests that the sooner cooling initiates the better a patient's outcome. However, there exists a 75-minute delay on average between admittance and catheter insertion. Even with a physician readily available to place the cooling catheter, the device setup takes a minimum of 11 minutes. When objectively evaluating the published data the average cooling rate for cooling catheters is 2.06 °C. Treatment with the Arctic Sun can be administered within 10 minutes by unsupervised nursing professionals.

Historically, clinicians reported that catheters cool at a quicker rate, however, a 2011 study published in the Society of Critical Care Medicine where 167 patients treated either with the Arctic Sun or the Alsius Coolgard Catheter demonstrated time from cardiac arrest to achieving mild therapeutic hypothermia was equal with both devices. In this study, there was no significant difference in survival with good neurologic function.

== See also ==
- Medical equipment
- Resuscitation
- Therapeutic hypothermia
