= FGIN-127 =

Chemical compound

Identifiers
- IUPAC name: 2-[2-(4-fluorophenyl)-1H-indol-3-yl]-N,N-dihexylacetamide
- CAS Number: 142720-24-9
- PubChem CID: 132496
- ChemSpider: 116994
- ChEBI: CHEBI:92171
- CompTox Dashboard (EPA): DTXSID90162141

Chemical and physical data
- Formula: C_{28}H_{37}FN_{2}O
- Molar mass: 436.615 g·mol^{−1}
- 3D model (JSmol): Interactive image
- SMILES: CCCCCCN(CCCCCC)C(=O)Cc1c2ccccc2[nH]c1c3ccc(cc3)F
- InChI: InChI=1S/C28H37FN2O/c1-3-5-7-11-19-31(20-12-8-6-4-2)27(32)21-25-24-13-9-10-14-26(24)30-28(25)22-15-17-23(29)18-16-22/h9-10,13-18,30H,3-8,11-12,19-21H2,1-2H3; Key:VUWXAQFLTSBUDB-UHFFFAOYSA-N

FGIN-1-27 is an anxiolytic drug which acts as a selective agonist at the peripheral benzodiazepine receptor, also known as the mitochondrial 18 kDa translocator protein or TSPO. It is thought to produce anxiolytic effects by stimulating steroidogenesis of neuroactive steroids such as allopregnanolone.
