= DPA-713 =

Chemical compound

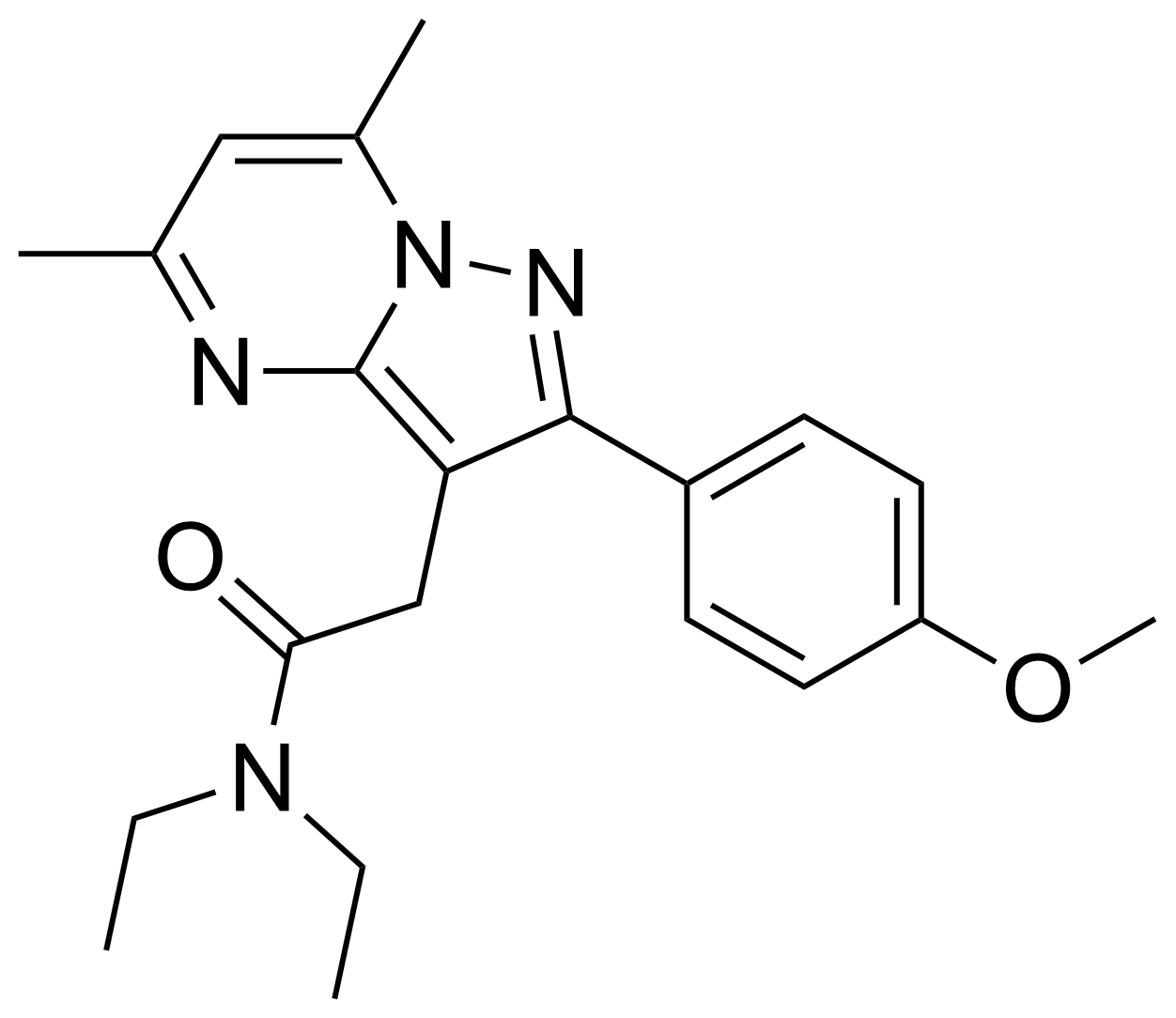

Identifiers
- IUPAC name: N,N-diethyl-2-(4-methoxyphenyl)-5,7-dimethylpyrazolo[1,5-a]pyrimidine-3-acetamide
- CAS Number: 386297-97-8
- PubChem CID: 11595759
- ChemSpider: 9770519
- UNII: PQF723MLIV
- CompTox Dashboard (EPA): DTXSID001126663

Chemical and physical data
- Formula: C_{21}H_{26}N_{4}O_{2}
- Molar mass: 366.465 g·mol^{−1}
- 3D model (JSmol): Interactive image
- SMILES: CCN(CC)C(=O)CC1=C2N=C(C=C(N2N=C1C3=CC=C(C=C3)OC)C)C
- InChI: InChI=1S/C21H26N4O2/c1-6-24(7-2)19(26)13-18-20(16-8-10-17(27-5)11-9-16)23-25-15(4)12-14(3)22-21(18)25/h8-12H,6-7,13H2,1-5H3; Key:ILZWUAWCTNWSFZ-UHFFFAOYSA-N

DPA-713 or N,N-diethyl-2-(4-methoxyphenyl)-5,7-dimethylpyrazolo[1,5-a]pyrimidine-3-acetamide is a selective ligand for the translocator protein (TSPO).

The binding affinity of DPA-713 for TSPO is reported as K_{i} = 4.7 ± 0.2 nM.

DPA-713 has been radiolabelled with carbon-11 as a potential radiotracer for imaging the TSPO using positron emission tomography (PET). Radiation dosimetry and biodistribution of [^{11}C]DPA-713 have been assessed in healthy volunteers, indicating that [^{11}C]DPA-713 is a suitable radiotracer for imaging the TSPO in humans.

== See also ==
- DPA-714
