= ALX-1393 =

Glycine reuptake inhibitor

Names
- IUPAC name (2S)-2-Amino-3-[(3-fluorophenyl)-(2-phenylmethoxyphenyl)methoxy]propanoic acid

Identifiers
CAS Number	949164-09-4
3D model (JSmol)	Interactive image
ChEMBL	ChEMBL475562
ChemSpider	115042561
IUPHAR/BPS	4622
PubChem CID	16078939
- InChI: InChI=1S/C23H22FNO4/c24-18-10-6-9-17(13-18)22(29-15-20(25)23(26)27)19-11-4-5-12-21(19)28-14-16-7-2-1-3-8-16/h1-13,20,22H,14-15,25H2,(H,26,27)/t20-,22?/m0/s1 Key: ADUSZEGHFWRTQS-AIBWNMTMSA-N
- SMILES: C1=CC=C(C=C1)COC2=CC=CC=C2C(C3=CC(=CC=C3)F)OCC(C(=O)O)N

Properties
Chemical formula	C_{23}H_{22}FNO_{4}
Molar mass	395.430 g·mol^{−1}
- Except where otherwise noted, data are given for materials in their standard state (at 25 °C [77 °F], 100 kPa). Infobox references

ALX-1393 is a glycine reuptake inhibitor.

== Pharmacodynamics ==
ALX-1393 works by inhibiting the action of GLYT2. This causes elevated levels of glycine, an inhibitory neurotransmitter.

== Potential uses ==
ALX-1393 has been shown to have potential as an analgesic. This is thought to be due to the elevated glycine levels reducing the transmission of the pain signals.

Tests have shown that it was able to help reduce cancer pain in a potent way.
