= DAA-1106 =

Chemical compound

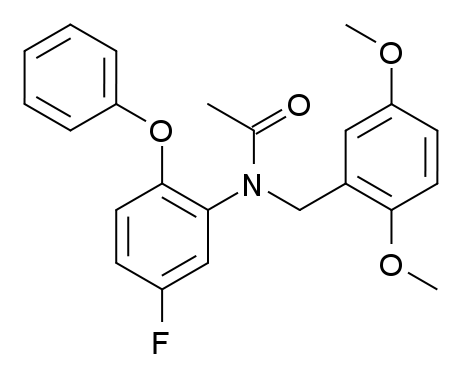

Identifiers
- IUPAC name: N-(2-Phenoxy-5-fluorophenyl)-N-(2,5-dimethoxybenzyl)acetamide
- CAS Number: 220551-92-8
- PubChem CID: 10430788
- ChemSpider: 8606215
- UNII: 3A8IVT5Q3P
- CompTox Dashboard (EPA): DTXSID30439829

Chemical and physical data
- Formula: C_{23}H_{22}FNO_{4}
- Molar mass: 395.430 g·mol^{−1}
- 3D model (JSmol): Interactive image
- SMILES: COC1=CC(CN(C(C)=O)C2=CC(F)=CC=C2OC3=CC=CC=C3)=C(O[11CH3])C=C1
- InChI: InChI=1S/C23H22FNO4/c1-16(26)25(15-17-13-20(27-2)10-12-22(17)28-3)21-14-18(24)9-11-23(21)29-19-7-5-4-6-8-19/h4-14H,15H2,1-3H3https://drugs.ncats.io/drug/696AIN172A#; Key:DCRZYADKQRHHSF-UHFFFAOYSA-N

DAA-1106 is a drug which acts as a potent and selective agonist at the peripheral benzodiazepine receptor, also known as the mitochondrial 18 kDa translocator protein or TSPO, but with no affinity at the GABAA receptor. It has anxiolytic effects in animal studies. DAA-1106 has a sub-nanomolar binding affinity (K_{i}) of 0.28 nM, and has been used extensively in its ^{3}H or ^{11}C radiolabelled form to map TSPO in the body and brain, which has proved especially helpful in monitoring the progress of neurodegenerative diseases such as Alzheimer's disease.

DAA-1106 is used in combination with positron emission tomography (PET) scanning to examine neuroinflammation in vivo.
