= Translocator protein =

Human protein

TSPO

Identifiers
- Aliases: TSPO, BPBS, BZRP, DBI, IBP, MBR, PBR, PBS, PKBS, PTBR, mDRC, pk18, translocator protein
- External IDs: OMIM: 109610; MGI: 88222; GeneCards: TSPO

Gene location (Human)
Chr.	Chromosome 22 (human)
Band	22q13.2	Start	43,151,547 bp
Band	22q13.2	End	43,163,242 bp

Gene location (Mouse)
Chr.	Chromosome 15 (mouse)
Band	15 E1|15 39.4 cM	Start	83,447,793 bp
Band	15 E1|15 39.4 cM	End	83,458,404 bp
RNA expression pattern
Bgee	Human / Mouse (ortholog); Top expressed in: mucosa of transverse colon; gingival epithelium; monocyte; granulocyte; skin of abdomen; mucosa of pharynx; skin of leg; minor salivary glands; nipple; left coronary artery / Top expressed in: lactiferous gland; white adipose tissue; brown adipose tissue; adrenal gland; tunica adventitia of aorta; right kidney; granulocyte; choroid plexus of fourth ventricle; pyloric antrum; subcutaneous adipose tissue; More reference expression data
BioGPS	n/a
Gene ontology
Molecular function	transmembrane transporter binding; androgen binding; benzodiazepine receptor activity; cholesterol binding; protein binding; cholesterol transfer activity
Cellular component	mitochondrial outer membrane; mitochondrion; integral component of membrane; membrane; mitochondrial membranes; extracellular exosome; endoplasmic reticulum
Biological process	positive regulation of necrotic cell death; response to vitamin B1; response to testosterone; negative regulation of glial cell proliferation; response to progesterone; negative regulation of ATP metabolic process; ageing; regulation of steroid biosynthetic process; contact inhibition; cellular hypotonic response; negative regulation of mitochondrion organization; negative regulation of autophagy of mitochondrion; ion transport; adrenal gland development; cellular response to zinc ion; negative regulation of protein ubiquitination; maintenance of protein location in mitochondrion; positive regulation of reactive oxygen species metabolic process; negative regulation of nitric oxide biosynthetic process; behavioral response to pain; response to manganese ion; establishment of protein localization to mitochondrion; positive regulation of mitochondrial depolarization; peripheral nervous system axon regeneration; response to pain; response to axon injury; positive regulation of apoptotic process; negative regulation of tumor necrosis factor production; chloride transport; cellular response to lipopolysaccharide; positive regulation of glial cell proliferation; glial cell migration; steroid biosynthetic process; positive regulation of calcium ion transport; signal transduction; steroid metabolic process; lipid transport; protein targeting to mitochondrion; anion transport; regulation of cholesterol transport; heme biosynthetic process; cell population proliferation; apoptotic process; C21-steroid hormone biosynthetic process; cholesterol transport; transport; regulation of cell population proliferation
Sources:Amigo / QuickGO
Orthologs
Databases	NCBI: entry; OMA: entry
Species	Human	Mouse
Entrez	706	12257
Ensembl	ENSG00000100300	ENSMUSG00000041736
UniProt	P30536	P50637
RefSeq (mRNA)	NM_000714; NM_001256530; NM_001256531; NM_007311	NM_009775
RefSeq (protein)	NP_000705; NP_001243459; NP_001243460; NP_000705.2; NP_001243459.1 NP_001243460.1	NP_033905
Location (UCSC)	Chr 22: 43.15 – 43.16 Mb	Chr 15: 83.45 – 83.46 Mb
PubMed search
- Wikidata
View/Edit Human	View/Edit Mouse

Translocator protein (TSPO) is an 18 kDa protein mainly found on the outer mitochondrial membrane. It was first described as peripheral benzodiazepine receptor (PBR), a secondary binding site for diazepam, but subsequent research has found the receptor to be expressed throughout the body and brain. In humans, the translocator protein is encoded by the TSPO gene. It belongs to a family of tryptophan-rich sensory proteins. Regarding intramitochondrial cholesterol transport, TSPO has been proposed to interact with StAR (steroidogenic acute regulatory protein) to transport cholesterol into mitochondria, though evidence is mixed.

== Function ==
In animals, TSPO (PBR) is a mitochondrial protein usually located in the outer mitochondrial membrane and characterised by its ability to bind a variety of benzodiazepine-like drugs, as well as to dicarboxylic tetrapyrrole intermediates of the haem biosynthetic pathway.

TSPO has many proposed functions depending on the tissue. The most studied of these include roles in the immune response, steroid synthesis and apoptosis.

=== Cholesterol transport and bile acid biosynthesis ===
Mitochondrial cholesterol transport is a molecular function closely tied to TSPO in the scientific literature. TSPO binds with high affinity to the lipid cholesterol, and pharmacological ligands of TSPO facilitate cholesterol transport across the mitochondrial intermembrane space to stimulate steroid synthesis and bile acid synthesis in relevant tissues. However, TSPO deletion in genetically engineered mouse models has yielded mixed results regarding the physiological necessity of TSPO's role in steroidogenesis. Deletion of TSPO in steroidogenic Leydig cells did not impair synthesis of the steroid testosterone. Thus, though biochemical and pharmacological experimentation suggest an important role for TSPO in cellular cholesterol transport and steroid biosynthesis, TSPO's necessity in this process remains controversial.

=== Regulation in the heart ===
TSPO (Translocator protein) acts to regulate heart rate and contractile force by its interaction with voltage-dependent calcium channels in cardiac myocytes. The interaction between TSPO and calcium channels can alter cardiac action potential durations, thus contractility of the heart. In healthy individuals, TSPO has a cardio-protective role. When TSPO is up-regulated in the presence of infections, it can limit the inflammatory response, which can be cardio-damaging.

=== Immunomodulation ===
PBRs (TSPOs) have many actions on immune cells including modulation of oxidative bursts by neutrophils and macrophages, inhibition of the proliferation of lymphoid cells and secretion of cytokines by macrophages. Expression of TSPO is also linked to inflammatory responses that occur after ischemia-reperfusion injury, following hemorrhagic brain injury, and in some neurodegenerative diseases.

Increased expression of TSPO is linked to the inflammatory responses in the heart that may cause myocarditis, which can lead to myocardial necrosis. TSPO is present in mast cells and macrophages, indicating its role in the immune system. Oxidative stress is a strong contributing factor to cardiovascular disease, and often occurs because of inflammation caused by ischemia reperfusion injury. Coxsackievirus B3 (CVB3) causes immune cells CD11b+ (present on macrophages) to stimulate inflammatory infiltration. Functionally, CD11b+ regulates leukocyte adhesion and migration to regulate the inflammatory response. Following infection, CD11b+ is up-regulated, activating these immune responses, which then activate an increased expression of TSPO. These immune cells can cause myocarditis which can progress to dilated cardiomyopathy and heart failure.

=== Apoptosis ===
Ligands of TSPO have been shown to induce apoptosis in human colorectal cancer cells. In lymphatic tissues, TSPO modulates apoptosis of thymocytes via reduction of mitochondrial transmembrane potential.

=== Stress adaptation ===
TSPO in the basal land plant Physcomitrella patens, a moss, is essential for adaptation to salt stress.

== Tissue distribution ==
TSPO is found in many regions of the body including the human iris/ciliary-body. Other tissues include the heart, liver, adrenal and testis, as well as hemopoietic and lymphatic cells. "Peripheral" benzodiazepine receptors are also found in the brain, although only at around a quarter the expression levels of the "central" benzodiazepine receptors located at the plasma membrane.

== Therapeutic applications ==
TSPO has been shown to be involved in a number of processes such as inflammation, and TSPO ligands may be useful anti-cancer drugs.

Pharmacological activation of TSPO has been observed to be a potent stimulator of steroid biosynthesis including neuroactive steroids such as allopregnanolone in the brain, which exert anxiolytic properties. Thus, TSPO ligands such as emapunil, alpidem, and etifoxine have been proposed to be useful as potential anxiolytics which may have less addiction-based side effects than traditional benzodiazepine-type drugs., though toxicity side-effects remain a significant barrier in drug development.

A 2013 study led by researchers from USC Davis School of Gerontology showed that TSPO ligands can prevent and at least partially correct abnormalities present in a mouse model of Alzheimer's disease.

TSPO as a biomarker is a newly discovered non-invasive procedure, and has also been linked as a biomarker for other cardiovascular related diseases including: myocardial infarction (due to ischemic reperfusion), cardiac hypertrophy, atherosclerosis, arrhythmias, and large vessel vasculitis. TSPO can be used as a biomarker to detect the presence and severity of inflammation in the heart and atherosclerotic plaques. Inhibiting the over-production of TSPO can lead to a reduced incidence of arrhythmias which are most often caused by ischemia reperfusion injury. TSPO ligands are used as a therapy after ischemia reperfusion injury to preserve the action potentials in cardiac tissue and restore normal electrical activity of the heart. Higher levels of TSPO are present in those with heart disease, a change that is more common in men than women because testosterone worsens the inflammation causing permanent damage to the heart.

The first high-resolution 3D solution structure of mammalian (mouse) translocator protein (TSPO) in a complex with its diagnostic PK11195 ligand was determined by means of NMR spectroscopy techniques by scientists from the Max-Planck Institute for Biophysical Chemistry in Goettingen in Germany in March 2014 (Jaremko et al., 2014) and has a PDB id: 2MGY. Obtained high-resolution clearly confirms a helical character of a protein and its complex with a diagnostic ligand in solution. The 3D structure of the mTSPO-PK11195 complex comprises five transmembrane α-helices (TM1 to TM5) that tightly pack together in the clockwise order TM1-TM2-TM5-TM4-TM3 (cytosol view). The mammalian TSPO in a complex with diagnostic ligand is nomomeric. The loop located in between TM1 and TM2 helices closes the entrance to the space between helices in which are bound with PK11195 molecule. Site-directed mutagenesis studies of mTSPO revealed that region important for PK11195 binding comprise amino acids from 41 to 51, because the deletion of this region resulted in the decrease in PK11195 binding (Fan et al., 2012).

The mammalian TSPO in a complex with the diagnostic ligand PK11195 is monomeric.

== Imaging ==
Ligands of the TSPO are very useful for imaging of inflammation. For example, the radioligand [3H]PK-11195 has been used in receptor autoradiography to study neuroinflammation following brain injury. The affinity of [11C]PBR28 depends on a single polymorphism (rs6971) in the TSPO gene.

Measuring microglial activation in vivo is possible using PET imaging and radioligands binding to 18 kDa translocator protein (TSPO). Activation can be measured using the PET tracer (R)-[11C]PK11195 and others like PBR28 are under research.

== Ligands ==
TSPO ligands (endogenous or synthetic) modulate the action of this receptor, activating the transport of cholesterol from the outer to the inner mitochondrial membrane.

=== Agonists ===
- YL-IPA08
- Ro5-4864 - original ligand with which TSPO receptor was characterised, now less used due to inter-species differences in binding affinity. Sedative yet also convulsant and anxiogenic in mice.

Peptides

- Anthralin - 16kDa polypeptide, binds to both TSPO receptor and dihydropyridine-sensitive calcium channels with high affinity.
- Diazepam binding inhibitor (DBI) - 11kDa neuropeptide, potent agonist for TSPO receptor and stimulates steroidogenesis in vivo, also negative allosteric modulator of benzodiazepine-sensitive GABA_{A} receptors.
- DBI 17-50 fragment - active processing product of DBI

Non-peptides

- Alpidem
- DAA-1097
- DAA-1106
- Deuterated etifoxine
- DPA-713
- DPA-714
- Emapunil
- Etifoxine
- Gidazepam
- FGIN-127
- FGIN-143
- GML-1
- Olesoxime (TRO19622)
- SSR-180,575

=== Antagonists ===
- PK-11195 - potent and selective antagonist for both rat and human forms of TSPO.

== See also ==
- Steroidogenic enzyme
- Neurosteroidogenesis inhibitor
