= PK 11195 =

Names
- IUPAC name N-Butan-2-yl-1-(2-chlorophenyl)-N-methylisoquinoline-3-carboxamide
- Other names PK 11195

Identifiers
CAS Number	85532-75-8
3D model (JSmol)	Interactive image
ChEBI	CHEBI:73290
ChEMBL	ChEMBL15313
ChemSpider	1305
PubChem CID	1345
UNII	YNF83VN1RL
CompTox Dashboard (EPA)	DTXSID7041097
- InChI: InChI=1S/C21H21ClN2O/c1-4-14(2)24(3)21(25)19-13-15-9-5-6-10-16(15)20(23-19)17-11-7-8-12-18(17)22/h5-14H,4H2,1-3H3 Key: RAVIZVQZGXBOQO-UHFFFAOYSA-N
- SMILES: CCC(C)N(C)C(=O)c3cc1ccccc1c(n3)-c2ccccc2Cl

Properties
Chemical formula	C_{21}H_{21}ClN_{2}O
Molar mass	352.856 g/mol
- Except where otherwise noted, data are given for materials in their standard state (at 25 °C [77 °F], 100 kPa). verify (what is ?) Infobox references

PK 11195 is an isoquinoline carboxamide which binds selectively to the peripheral benzodiazepine receptor (PBR; also known as the mitochondrial 18 kDa translocator protein or TSPO). It is one of the most commonly used PBR ligands due to its high affinity for the PBR in all species, although it is starting to be replaced by newer and more selective ligands.

Early autoradiographic studies using tritiated PK 11195 ([^{3}H]PK 11195) demonstrated that in the central nervous system (CNS) of rodents, it binds primarily to the ependymal walls, choroid plexus, and olfactory bulb. However, there is a robust and widespread increase in [^{3}H]PK 11195 binding in the injured nervous system. The binding sites have since been determined to be on glial cells, including microglia, astrocytes, and infiltrating macrophages. The binding of [^{3}H]PK 11195 is considered to be a useful tool in the assessment of neuronal damage.

In addition to being a marker of neuronal damage in animal models of CNS damage, PK 11195 has been used successfully with human brain imaging techniques. (R)-[^{11}C]PK 11195 has been used in positron emission tomography (PET) scanning to visualize brain inflammation in patients with neuronal damage. Increases in (R)-[^{11}C]PK 11195 binding have been reported in patients with stroke, traumatic brain injury and in patients with chronic neurodegenerative conditions including Huntington's disease and Parkinson's disease.

The first high-resolution 3D solution structure of mammalian (mouse) translocator protein (TSPO) in a complex with its diagnostic PK 11195 ligand was determined by using NMR spectroscopy techniques by scientists from the Max-Planck Institute for Biophysical Chemistry in Goettingen in Germany in March 2014 and has a PDB id: 2MGY. The complex stoichiometry was found to be 1 : 1 as the one consistent set of 1H ligand resonances was found with the NOE contacts to five transmembrane helices (TM) in the upper cytosolic part of the protein channel. Residues involved in the ligand binding having direct NOE contacts with the ligand were identified and are as follows A23, V26, L49, V26, A50, I52, W107, L114, A147, L150. These residues are wrapped around the PK 11195 ligand forming a stable hydrophobic binding pocket that can also be regarded as the complex's hydrophobic core. The mammalian TSPO in a complex with diagnostic ligand is monomeric.

The loop located in between TM1 and TM2 helices closes the entrance to the space between helices in which are bound with PK 11195 molecule. Site-directed mutagenesis studies of mTSPO revealed that region important for PK 11195 binding comprise amino acids from 41 to 51, because the deletion of this region resulted in the decrease in PK 11195 binding.
