= List of 5α-reductase inhibitors =

This is a list of 5α-reductase inhibitors (5α-RIs), drugs which inhibit one or more isoforms of the enzyme 5α-reductase. This enzyme is responsible for the conversion of the androgen hormone testosterone into the more potent dihydrotestosterone (DHT) and is essential for the production of neurosteroids like allopregnanolone, tetrahydrodeoxycorticosterone (THDOC), and 3α-androstanediol from progesterone, deoxycorticosterone, and DHT, respectively. 5α-Reductase inhibitors have medical applications in the treatment of benign prostatic hyperplasia, androgenic alopecia (pattern hair loss), and hirsutism (excessive hair growth).

== Pharmaceutical drugs ==
5α-RIs that are used in medicine include the following:

- Alfatradiol (Ell-Cranell Alpha, Pantostin)
- Dutasteride (Avodart) – inhibits types 1, 2, and 3
- Epristeride (Aipuliete, Chuanliu) – inhibits type 2
- Finasteride (Proscar, Propecia) – inhibits types 2 and 3

== Experimental drugs ==
5α-RIs that were under development for potential clinical use but were never marketed or are used in research include the following:

- 4-MA – inhibits types 1 and 2 (IC_{50} = 8.5 nM), but also 3β-HSD inhibitor, investigated extensively but found to be hepatotoxic
- 17β-Carboxy-4-androsten-3-one
- AS-97004
- Azelaic Acid
- Bexlosteride (LY-300502) – inhibits type 1
- CGP-53153
- DHEA-caproate ester (#121) has a IC50 of 0.049nM for the 5-AR.
- Efomycin G (SNA 4606-2)
- EM-402
- FCE-28260 – inhibits types 1 and 2
- FK-143
- FR-146687
- G-20000
- Izonsteride (LY-320236) – inhibits types 1 and 2
- L-10
- L-39
- L-697818
- L-751788 (16-((4-chlorophenyl)oxy)-4,7-dimethyl-4-azaandronstan-3-one)
- Lapisteride (CS-891) – inhibits types 1 and 2
- Lavanducyanin (WS-9659A) & WS-9659B [123313-61-1]
- LY-191704
- LY-266111
- MK-386 (L-733692) – inhibits type 1
- MK-434 – inhibits type 2
- MK-963 (L-654066) – inhibits type 2
- ONO-3805 (ONO-RI-3805)
- PHL-00801 (Prostatonin; PY 102/UR 102; Pygeum africanum/Urtica dioica extract)
- PNU-157706 – inhibits types 1 and 2
- Steroidal oximes
- Turosteride (FCE-26073) – inhibits type 2 and to a 15-fold lesser extent type 1
- Z-350 – also an α_{1}-adrenergic receptor antagonist

== Herbs and other inhibitors ==
Many plants, as well as their associated phytochemical constituents, have inhibitory effects on 5α-reductase. In addition, many of these compounds are also phytoestrogens. Examples include the following:

- Lion's Mane mushrooms
- Alizarin
- Angelica koreana
- Astaxanthin
- Azelaic acid, (sometimes combined with minoxidil hair solution).
- Black Pepper leaf extract (Piper nigrum)
- Berberine
- β-Sitosterol, one of many phytosterols.
- Chinese knotweed (Reynoutria multiflora, syn. Polygonum multiflorum), contains resveratrol-like Stilbenoids.
- Curcumin, the principal curcuminoid of turmeric.
- Dodder (Cuscuta reflexa)
- Eastern arborvitae, northern whitecedar (Thuja occidentalis)
- Euphorbia jolkinii
- Fatty acids: The relative inhibitory potencies of unsaturated fatty acids are, in decreasing order: Gamma-Linolenic acid, alpha-linolenic acid, linoleic acid, palmitoleic acid, oleic acid, and myristoleic acid.
  - Medium chain fatty acids such as those found in coconut and the kernel of many palm fruits have also been found to inhibit 5α-reductase.
- Epitestosterone Endogenous steroid and an epimer of testosterone
- Garden balsam or rose balsam (Impatiens balsamina)
- Green tea catechins, including (-)-epicatechin-3-gallate, and (-)-epigallo-catechin-3-gallate (EGCG). However, another research found that green tea may actually increase DHT levels.
- Black tea theaflavins
- Japanese hedge parsley (Torilis japonica)
- Ku Shen or Bitter root (Sophora flavescens)
- Lingzhi mushroom or Reishi mushroom (Ganoderma lucidum)
  - Ganoderic acid, or Ganoderol B are thought to be the compounds in the mushroom that are specifically active.
- Pesticides: Certain pesticides are able to disturb the sex steroid hormone system and to act as antiandrogens.
- Phyllanthus emblica
- Pine (Pinus sp. resin, active substance abietic acid)
- Pollen of Turnip, turnip rape, fast plants, field mustard, or turnip mustard (Brassica rapa)
- Polyphenols
- Red stinkwood (Pygeum africanum)
- Riboflavin (vitamin B2).
- Saw palmetto (Serenoa repens, active substance possibly lauric acid)
  - The berries of saw palmetto, a small palm native to the south east United States, possess a dual but weak 5a-reductase inhibition activity, due to their high content of phytosterols: β-sitosterol, stigmasterol, lupeol, lupenone, and cycloartenol. The lipido-sterol extract markedly inhibits both the human isoenzymes. Type 1 isoenzyme is noncompetitively (Ki = 7.2 μg/mL) and type 2 isoenzyme uncompetitively (Ki = 4.9 μg/mL) inhibited. In vitro studies revealed a 5a-reductase inhibition activity of 1:5600 compared to finasteride but is at minimum 1:18000 in vivo. Meaning the 5a-reductase inhibition activity of 1 mg finasteride is equal to 18000 mg saw palmetto.
- Spore of Japanese climbing fern (Lygodium japonicum)
- Valoneic acid dilactone and gallagyldilactone are two hydrolysable tannin polyphenols isolated from the heartwood of Shorea laevifolia and the North American white oak (Quercus alba) and European red oak (Quercus robur) and are inhibitory.
- Zinc

These supplements have limited testing in human clinical trials, and their potential for the treatment of BPH, androgenic alopecia, and related conditions is unknown.
