= MK-386 =

Chemical compound

Clinical data
- Other names: L-733692; 4,7β-Dimethyl-4-aza-5α-cholestan-3-one
- Routes of administration: By mouth
- Drug class: 5α-Reductase inhibitor

Identifiers
- IUPAC name: (1R,3aS,3bS,4S,5aR,9aR,9bS,11aR)-4,6,9a,11a-Tetramethyl-1-[(2R)-6-methylheptan-2-yl]-2,3,3a,3b,4,5,5a,8,9,9b,10,11-dodecahydro-1H-indeno[5,4-f]quinolin-7-one
- CAS Number: 158493-17-5
- PubChem CID: 9888107
- ChemSpider: 154966
- UNII: JWDKP12EUC
- CompTox Dashboard (EPA): DTXSID20935926

Chemical and physical data
- Formula: C_{28}H_{49}NO
- Molar mass: 415.706 g·mol^{−1}
- 3D model (JSmol): Interactive image
- SMILES: C[C@H]1C[C@@H]2[C@](CCC(=O)N2C)([C@@H]3[C@@H]1[C@@H]4CC[C@@H]([C@]4(CC3)C)[C@H](C)CCCC(C)C)C
- InChI: InChI=1S/C28H49NO/c1-18(2)9-8-10-19(3)21-11-12-22-26-20(4)17-24-28(6,16-14-25(30)29(24)7)23(26)13-15-27(21,22)5/h18-24,26H,8-17H2,1-7H3/t19-,20+,21-,22+,23+,24-,26+,27-,28-/m1/s1; Key:XUTZDXHKQDPUMA-MVJJLJOTSA-N

MK-386, also known as 4,7β-dimethyl-4-aza-5α-cholestan-3-one, is a synthetic, steroidal 5α-reductase inhibitor which was first reported in 1994 and was never marketed. It is a 4-azasteroid and a potent and selective inhibitor of 5α-reductase type I and shows high selectivity for inhibition of human 5α-reductase type I over 5α-reductase type II, with IC_{50} values of 0.9 nM and 154 nM, respectively. The drug was under investigation for potential treatment of androgen-dependent conditions such as acne and pattern hair loss (androgenic alopecia or baldness), but was discontinued in early clinical trials due to observations of hepatotoxicity such as elevated liver enzymes.

MK-386 has been found to decrease circulating concentrations of dihydrotestosterone (DHT) in men by 20 to 30%, which is in accordance with the fact that 5α-reductase type II is responsible for 70 to 80% of DHT production while 5α-reductase type I is responsible for 20 to 30%. In contrast to MK-386, the selective 5α-reductase type II inhibitor finasteride has been found to decrease DHT levels by about 70%, while the non-selective 5α-reductase inhibitor dutasteride decreases DHT levels by up to 98%. Co-administration of MK-386 and finasteride was found to produce near-complete (~95%) suppression of circulating DHT levels.

MK-386 has been found to significantly decrease concentrations of DHT in sebum, similarly to the selective 5α-reductase type II inhibitor finasteride. However, whereas finasteride results in only a modest reduction in sebum DHT levels of 15%, MK-386 has been found to produce a significantly greater reduction of 55%. While finasteride decreases semen DHT levels by approximately 88%, MK-386 has been found to have no effect on levels of DHT in semen. These findings are in accordance with the known tissue distribution of 5α-reductase isoforms.

MK-386 was assessed in the treatment of acne but failed to separate from placebo in effectiveness and was significantly inferior to antibiotic therapy with minocycline. In addition, the addition of MK-386 to minocycline failed to increase effectiveness relative to minocycline alone. A study of MK-386 treatment for one year in stumptail macaques found that the drug failed to increase scalp hair weight in a model of androgenic alopecia, in contrast to finasteride.
