= MK-434 =

Chemical compound

Clinical data
- Other names: MK-0434; 17β-Benzoyl-4-aza-5α-androst-1-en-3-one
- Routes of administration: By mouth
- Drug class: 5α-Reductase inhibitor

Identifiers
- IUPAC name: (1S,3aS,3bS,5aR,9aR,9bS,11aS)-1-Benzoyl-9a,11a-dimethyl-1,2,3,3a,3b,4,5,5a,6,9b,10,11-dodecahydroindeno[5,4-f]quinolin-7-one
- CAS Number: 134067-56-4
- PubChem CID: 131705
- ChemSpider: 116366
- UNII: J5DR1P0IKK

Chemical and physical data
- Formula: C_{25}H_{31}NO_{2}
- Molar mass: 377.528 g·mol^{−1}
- 3D model (JSmol): Interactive image
- SMILES: C[C@]12CC[C@H]3[C@H]([C@@H]1CC[C@@H]2C(=O)C4=CC=CC=C4)CC[C@@H]5[C@@]3(C=CC(=O)N5)C
- InChI: InChI=1S/C25H31NO2/c1-24-14-12-19-17(8-11-21-25(19,2)15-13-22(27)26-21)18(24)9-10-20(24)23(28)16-6-4-3-5-7-16/h3-7,13,15,17-21H,8-12,14H2,1-2H3,(H,26,27)/t17-,18-,19-,20+,21+,24-,25+/m0/s1; Key:ZYTQEOWFSVTRLX-QKONGSNMSA-N

MK-434 is a 5α-reductase inhibitor which was under development in the 1990s by Merck & Co for the treatment of a variety of androgen-dependent conditions including benign prostatic hyperplasia, prostate cancer, pattern hair loss, excessive hair growth, acne, and seborrhea but was never marketed. It acts as a selective inhibitor of 5α-reductase type 2. The drug has been found to decrease circulating dihydrotestosterone levels by a maximum of approximately 50% in men. MK-434 is a synthetic 4-azasteroid and is structurally related to other 5α-reductase inhibitors like finasteride.

== See also ==
- List of 5α-reductase inhibitors
- AS-601811
- Epristeride
