= Turosteride =

Chemical compound

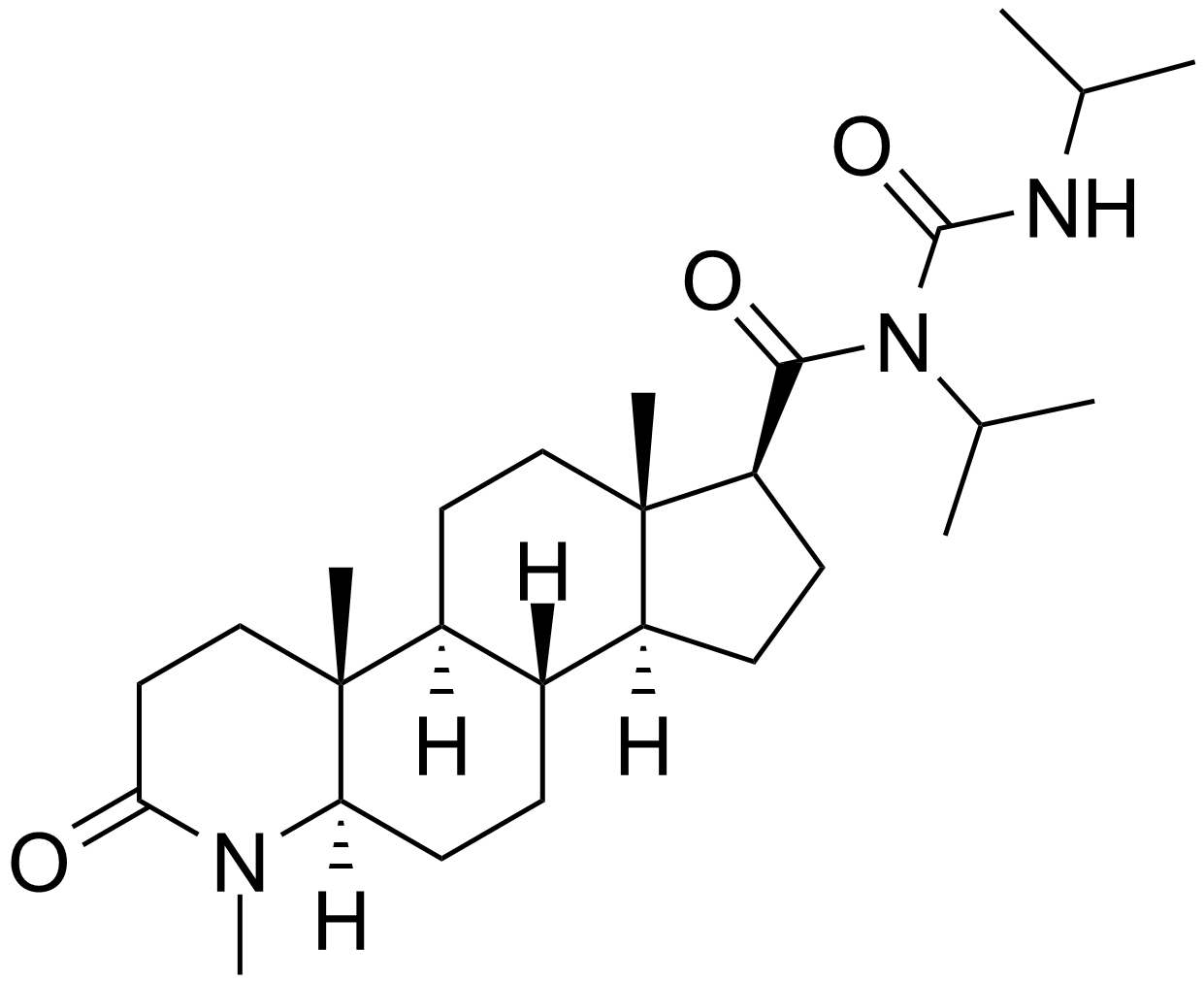

Clinical data
- Other names: 1-(4-methyl-3-oxo-4-aza-5-alpha-androstane-17-beta-carbonyl)-1,3- diisopropylurea
- Routes of administration: Oral
- ATC code: none

Legal status
- Legal status: Never marketed

Identifiers
- IUPAC name: (4aR,4bS,6aS,7S,9aS,9bS,11aR)-1,4a,6a-trimethyl-2-oxo-N-(propan-2-yl)-N-(propan-2-ylcarbamoyl)hexadecahydro-1H-indeno[5,4-f]quinoline-7-carboxamide
- CAS Number: 137099-09-3
- PubChem CID: 65986
- ChemSpider: 59380
- UNII: LU1LTK666W
- CompTox Dashboard (EPA): DTXSID001029394

Chemical and physical data
- Formula: C_{27}H_{45}N_{3}O_{3}
- Molar mass: 459.675 g·mol^{−1}
- 3D model (JSmol): Interactive image
- SMILES: O=C(NC(C)C)N(C(=O)[C@@H]2[C@]1(CC[C@H]3[C@H]([C@@H]1CC2)CC[C@H]4N(C(=O)CC[C@]34C)C)C)C(C)C
- InChI: InChI=1S/C27H45N3O3/c1-16(2)28-25(33)30(17(3)4)24(32)21-10-9-19-18-8-11-22-27(6,15-13-23(31)29(22)7)20(18)12-14-26(19,21)5/h16-22H,8-15H2,1-7H3,(H,28,33)/t18-,19-,20-,21+,22+,26-,27+/m0/s1; Key:WMPQMBUXZHMEFZ-YJPJVVPASA-N

Turosteride (FCE-26,073) is a selective inhibitor of the enzyme 5α-reductase which was under investigation by GlaxoSmithKline for the treatment of benign prostatic hyperplasia (BPH), but was never marketed. Similarly to finasteride, turosteride is selective for the type II isoform of 5α-redcutase, with about 15-fold selectivity for it over type I isoform of the enzyme. In animal studies it has been shown to inhibit prostate size and retard tumor growth. It may also be useful for the treatment of acne and hair loss.

== See also ==
- 5α-Reductase inhibitor
- FCE 28,260
