= Bexlosteride =

Chemical compound

Clinical data
- Other names: LY 300502
- Routes of administration: Oral
- ATC code: none

Legal status
- Legal status: In general: uncontrolled

Identifiers
- IUPAC name: (4aR,10bR)-8-Chloro-4-methyl-1,4,4a,5,6,10b-hexahydrobenzo[f]quinolin-3(2H)-one
- CAS Number: 148905-78-6
- PubChem CID: 166562
- ChemSpider: 145762
- UNII: 36X732P4P0
- ChEMBL: ChEMBL24955

Chemical and physical data
- Formula: C_{14}H_{16}ClNO
- Molar mass: 249.74 g·mol^{−1}
- 3D model (JSmol): Interactive image
- SMILES: CN1[C@@H]2CCc3cc(ccc3[C@H]2CCC1=O)Cl
- InChI: InChI=1S/C14H16ClNO/c1-16-13-6-2-9-8-10(15)3-4-11(9)12(13)5-7-14(16)17/h3-4,8,12-13H,2,5-7H2,1H3/t12-,13-/m1/s1; Key:WQBIOEFDDDEARX-CHWSQXEVSA-N

Bexlosteride is a potent and noncompetitive inhibitor of the enzyme 5α-reductase related to finasteride and dutasteride. It is selective for the type I isoform of the enzyme. It advanced to Phase III clinical trials, but development was halted at that stage, and it was never marketed.

== Synthesis ==
The synthesis of Bexlosteride has been reported in the literature.

FGI of 6-Chloro-2-tetralone [17556-18-2] (1) to its enamine by reaction with pyrrolidine (or with the chiral amine 1-phenethylamine to ensure enantioselectivity) gives 1-(6-chloro-3,4-dihydronaphthalen-2-yl)pyrrolidine [54670-11-0] (2). Reaction with acrylamide [79-06-1] would be expected to be a 2-phase process. First a conjugate Michael addition occurs followed by displacement of pyrrolidine by the amide nitrogen to form an unsaturated lactam. The product of this step is called 8-chloro-1,4,5,6-tetrahydrobenzo[f]quinolin-3(2H)-one, PC10466539 (3). The lactam-olefin at the ring junction is reduced with triethylsilane in the presence of trifluoroacetic acid. The saturated lactam consists largely of racemic isomer with the trans ring junction. Alkylation of the lactam nitrogen with methyl halide in the presence of base gives 8-Chloro-4-methyl-1,4,4a,5,6,10b-hexahydrobenzo[f]quinolin-3(2H)-one [152323-03-0] (4). Treatment with methanol opens the lactam ring to yield the corresponding methyl ester, PC10826711 (5). The amino-ester is next resolved via its ditoluyl tartrate salt giving PC10516975 (6). Finally, heating with sodium carbonate regenerates the lactam ring to afford Bexlosteride (7).

N.B. The starting tetralone finds dual use in the synthesis of 6-CAT.

== See also ==
- 5α-Reductase inhibitor
- Izonsteride
