= Androgen suppression =

Medical treatment to suppress or block male sex hormones

Androgen suppression, also known as testosterone suppression, is a medical treatment to suppress or block the production or action of male sex hormones, typically used against certain cancers that rely on male growth hormones. This is done by castration (sometimes chemical castration) or by prescribing female sex hormones and drugs called antiandrogens. It is employed in androgen deprivation therapy for prostate cancer, feminizing hormone therapy for transgender women, polyendocrine metabolic ovarian syndrome (PMOS), acne and hirsutism in women, and against other androgen-dependent conditions.

== Role in gender affirming care ==
An important goal for many transgender women is to live in society as women, as secondary sex characteristics are vastly impacted by sex hormones, the modulation and suppression of certain sex hormones like testosterone and DHT are important to accomplish this goal. Further anti-androgenic effects can be caused by the suppression of hormones that trigger the release of androgens such as DHEA and gonadotropin-releasing hormone (GnRH). This can be achieved in a number of ways including hormone therapy and surgery.

=== Anti-androgen medication ===
Supplementation of estrogens, which is already a primary aspect of feminizing hormone therapy, has some anti-androgenic effects due to negative feedback on the hypothalamic–pituitary–gonadal axis. This is usually used in conjunction with specific anti-androgen medication for the sole purpose of androgen suppression as most patients require additional anti-androgen medication to decrease testosterone production. While all antiandrogens exist to suppress androgens, different antiandrogens have different mechanisms of action which may act on specific or multiple portions of the androgen metabolic pathway in order to either halt the production of androgens or block androgen receptors. Several subclasses of anti-androgen medication which are differentiated by mechanism of action include the following.

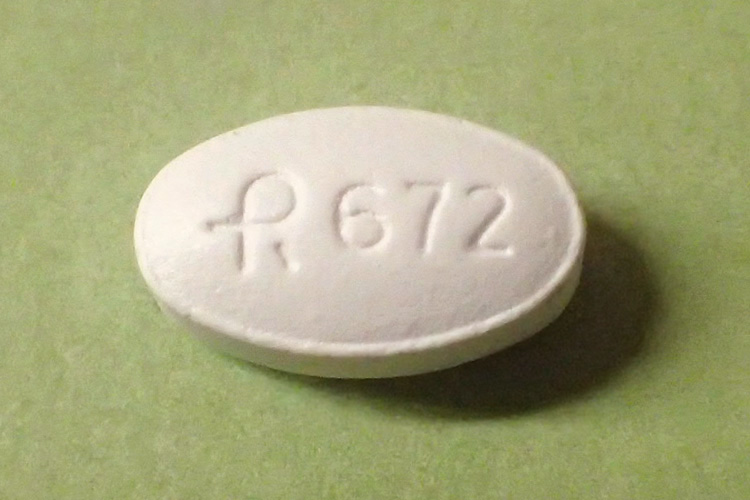
Spironolactone 50mg pill.

==== Androgen receptor antagonists ====
AR antagonists are drugs that directly block androgen receptors by binding to them. Among this class of medication, the most commonly prescribed include cyproterone acetate, bicalutamide and spironolactone.

==== Androgen synthesis inhibitors ====
Androgen synthesis inhibitors are drugs which directly inhibit the production of androgens instead of blocking the receptors. This class of drug also contains cyproterone acetate, bicalutamide and spironolactone which have direct suppressive effect on testosterone synthesis at higher doses as well as 5-alpha reductase inhibitors which most commonly include finasteride and dutasteride which only blocks conversion of testosterone into the potent androgen dihydrotestosterone. 5-alpha reductase inhibitors for that reason are useful for patients seeking only partial feminization or as a secondary agent to further suppress androgen activity.

==== Antigonadotropins ====
Antigonadotropins are drugs which suppress the effects of either follicle-stimulating hormone, luteinizing hormone or both. This results in anti-androgenic effects due to negative feedback on the hypothalamic–pituitary–gonadal axis which consequently suppress gonadal androgen production. Common medications prescribed for this purpose include progestogens and estrogens which have the dual purpose of also being responsible for the development of secondary sex characteristics.

==== Surgery ====
The usage of bilateral orchiectomy to remove the androgen producing organs as a means of androgen suppression is a procedure that some individuals may use as a standalone protocol or a step before a full vaginoplasty. This procedure is considered as a more cost effective as it is regarded as a simple procedure with a low chance of post-surgery complications and negates the necessity of additional anti-androgen medication. A bilateral orchiectomy requires thoughtful consideration, informed consent and the patient to be ready for irreversible change.

== Androgen suppression in biological females ==
=== Causes and symptoms of female hyperandrogenism ===
Androgen excess, also referred to as hyperandrogenism, is the presence of heightened androgenic steroids in patients with female biology. Polyendocrine metabolic ovarian syndrome (PMOS), affecting roughly 10% of biological females, is the most common cause of long-term and mild to moderate hyperandrogenism. Common symptoms include hirsutism, acne, and androgenic alopecia. Other causes of androgen excess include congenital adrenal hyperplasia, severe insulin resistance (SIR), and impaired glucose tolerance. These conditions, along with menstrual history, should be taken into consideration when evaluating a patient. PMOS causes the deregulation of the 5a-reductase (5aR), which can lead to weak androgens such as dehydroepiandrosterone (DHEA), dehydroepiandrosterone sulfate (DHEAS), and androstenedione (A4) secreted by the ovaries and adrenal cortex to be synthesized into the more potent androgens testosterone and active dihydrotestosterone (DHT).

=== Treatments ===
The type of treatment recommended for androgen excess is dependent on the condition's specific pathology, as well as the patient's age and lifestyle. In many cases, a combination of multiple treatments show higher effectiveness than a single treatment alone. Many treatments for androgen excess interfere with fertility and gestation, and should not be used if a patient wishes to conceive.

==== Surgical treatments ====
Cases of severe hyperandrogenism due to ovarian and adrenal tumors are eligible for treatment through surgical removal. If ovarian tumors are present, a bilateral oophorectomy may also be performed. For premenopausal patients who wish to get pregnant, cytoreductive surgery is an option. Adrenal tumors can be treated both surgically or non-surgically by radiofrequency ablation and cryoablation.

==== Hormonal treatments ====
Hormonal combination contraceptives (HCCs) are commonly prescribed for patients with hyperandrogenism. HCCs target the biochemical causes while also showing effectiveness in treating hirsutism and hyperandrogenic acne. Progestins in HCCs suppress luteinizing hormone (LH) levels and androgen synthesis, and inhibit 5α-R. All progestins have seemingly similar effectiveness in androgen suppression, and there is no professional consensus on what specific type of HCC is the most effective. Ethinylestradiol in hormonal contraceptives also suppresses LH and helps to increase sex hormone-binding globulin (SHBG) which decreases ovarian androgen production and the concentration of free testosterone. Over 60% of women on hormonal contraceptives show improvements specifically in hirsutism related to androgen excess. Usual side effects of hormonal combination contraceptives include nausea, bloating, and mood swings.

==== Antiandrogens ====
Two forms of antiandrogens used in androgen suppression are androgen receptor antagonists and androgen synthesis inhibitors. Androgen receptor antagonists work by blocking androgens from binding to receptors, while androgen synthesis inhibitors work by blocking the production and biosynthesis of androgens. Common antiandrogens are spironolactone, finasteride, cyproterone acetate, and dutasteride. These treatments may take up to 9 to 12 months for full effectiveness and side effects include decreased libido, irregular menstrual cycle, muscle weakness, dizziness, hypotension, and hyperkalemia. Antiandrogens can have side effects on a developing fetus, so it is generally recommended to use a hormonal contraceptive to prevent pregnancy as well as help mitigate menstrual fluctuations.

==== Lifestyle modification ====
For women with PMOS experiencing obesity, weight loss has shown small decreases in testosterone, but should not be relied on alone as a comprehensive treatment for androgen excess. Obesity reduces the synthesis of SHBG, leading to higher androgen concentrations. A higher weight may also have negative effects on other treatments for symptoms of hyperandrogenism. Lifestyle modification is beneficial in reducing androgens and increasing SHBG, but full data on its effectiveness is limited.
