= Izonsteride =

Chemical compound

Clinical data
- Other names: LY-320,236
- Routes of administration: By mouth
- ATC code: None

Identifiers
- IUPAC name: (4aR,10bR)-8-[(4-ethyl-1,3-benzothiazol-2-yl)sulfanyl]-4,10b-dimethyl-1,4,4a,5,6,10b-hexahydrobenzo[f]quinolin-3(2H)-one
- CAS Number: 176975-26-1
- PubChem CID: 172988
- ChemSpider: 151061
- UNII: A5E8C36F34
- CompTox Dashboard (EPA): DTXSID80170230

Chemical and physical data
- Formula: C_{24}H_{26}N_{2}OS_{2}
- Molar mass: 422.61 g·mol^{−1}
- 3D model (JSmol): Interactive image
- SMILES: O=C4N(C)[C@@H]5CCc3cc(Sc1nc2c(cccc2s1)CC)ccc3[C@@]5(C)CC4

Izonsteride (developmental code name LY-320,236) is a selective inhibitor of the 5α-reductase, with dual effects on both the type I and type II isoforms of the enzyme. It was under development by Eli Lilly and Company and Fujisawa for the treatment of benign prostatic hyperplasia but was never marketed. Izonsteride may also be useful in the treatment of androgenic alopecia.

== Chemistry ==
=== Synthesis ===
The scheme used to produce a somewhat more complex 5α-reductase inhibitor relies on a chiral auxiliary to yield the final product as a single enantiomer. The first step starts with the reaction of bromotetralone with R-α-phenethylamine to afford the enamine. Reaction with methyl iodide adds the methyl group at what will be a steroid-like AB ring junction.

Preparation of Izonsteride

This product is then treated with acryloyl chloride. The initial step in this case probably involves the acylation of nitrogen on the enamine; conjugate addition then completes the formation of the lactam ring. Treatment of that product with triethyl silane then reduces the ring unsaturation and cleaves the benzylic nitrogen bond on the auxiliary to yield as the optically pure trans isomer. Displacement of bromine with the mercapto benzthiazole completes the synthesis of izonsteride.

== See also ==
- 5α-Reductase inhibitor
- List of 5α-reductase inhibitors
