= Testosterone/dutasteride =

Combination drug

Combination of
- Testosterone: Androgen
- Dutasteride: 5α-Reductase inhibitor

Clinical data
- Other names: Dutasteride/testosterone

Testosterone/dutasteride is a combination formulation of testosterone, an androgen, and dutasteride, a 5α-reductase inhibitor, which was under development by GlaxoSmithKline for the treatment of hypogonadism (low testosterone levels) in men in the 2000s. It reached phase II clinical trials prior to the discontinuation of its development.
