= AS-601811 =

Clinical data
- Other names: AS-601811; AS601811
- Routes of administration: Oral
- Drug class: 5α-Reductase inhibitor
- ATC code: None

Identifiers
- IUPAC name: 4,8-dimethyl-1,2,5,6-tetrahydrobenzo[f]quinolizin-3-one
- CAS Number: 194979-95-8
- PubChem CID: 10220187
- UNII: LIV8A6AE5F
- ChEMBL: ChEMBL118319

Chemical and physical data
- Formula: C_{15}H_{17}NO
- Molar mass: 227.307 g·mol^{−1}
- 3D model (JSmol): Interactive image
- SMILES: CC1=CC2=C(C=C1)N3CCC(=O)C(=C3CC2)C
- InChI: InChI=1S/C15H17NO/c1-10-3-5-14-12(9-10)4-6-13-11(2)15(17)7-8-16(13)14/h3,5,9H,4,6-8H2,1-2H3; Key:SNEPAAKJPPNOQM-UHFFFAOYSA-N

AS-601811 is a 5α-reductase inhibitor of type 1 of the enzyme which was under development for the treatment of acne, benign prostatic hyperplasia, hirsutism, male-pattern baldness, and prostate cancer but was never marketed. It is taken orally. The drug reached phase 1 clinical trials prior to the discontinuation of its development. It was being developed by Merck Serono.

== See also ==
- List of investigational hair loss drugs
- Epristeride
- MK-434
