= FCE 28260 =

Chemical compound

Clinical data
- Other names: PNU 156765
- Routes of administration: Oral
- ATC code: none

Identifiers
- IUPAC name: (4aR,4bS,6aS,7S,9aS,9bS,11aR)-4a,6a-Dimethyl-2-oxo-N-((2RS)-1,1,1-trifluoro-2-phenyl-2-propanyl)-2,4a,4b,5,6,6a,7,8,9,9a,9b,10,11,11a-tetradecahydro-1H-indeno[5,4-f]quinoline-7-carboxamide
- CAS Number: 155651-56-2
- ChemSpider: 117369
- UNII: HP9C5LM7NX

Chemical and physical data
- Formula: C_{28}H_{35}F_{3}N_{2}O_{2}
- Molar mass: 488.595 g·mol^{−1}
- 3D model (JSmol): Interactive image
- SMILES: FC(F)(F)C(c1ccccc1)(NC(=O)[C@@H]3[C@]2(CC[C@H]4[C@H]([C@@H]2CC3)CC[C@H]5NC(=O)\C=C/[C@]45C)C)C
- InChI: InChI=1S/C28H35F3N2O2/c1-25-15-13-20-18(9-12-22-26(20,2)16-14-23(34)32-22)19(25)10-11-21(25)24(35)33-27(3,28(29,30)31)17-7-5-4-6-8-17/h4-8,14,16,18-22H,9-13,15H2,1-3H3,(H,32,34)(H,33,35)/t18-,19-,20-,21+,22+,25-,26+,27?/m0/s1; Key:FAIZUAWLKOHMOP-ZOIXLQFFSA-N

FCE 28260 is an azasteroidal 5α-reductase inhibitor which was developed for the treatment of benign prostatic hyperplasia and androgenic alopecia (pattern hair loss) in the 1990s but was never marketed. FCE 28260 has been found to inhibit rat and human 5α-reductase with half-maximal inhibitory concentrations (IC_{50}) of 15 and 16 nM, respectively, while finasteride had values of 30 and 52 nM.
