= Dutasteride/tamsulosin =

Combination drug

Combination of
- Dutasteride: 5α-Reductase inhibitor
- Tamsulosin: Alpha-1 blocker

Clinical data
- Trade names: Jalyn
- AHFS/Drugs.com: Professional Drug Facts
- License data: US DailyMed: Dutasteride_and_tamsulosin
- Pregnancy category: AU: X (High risk)
- Routes of administration: By mouth
- ATC code: G04CA52 (WHO)

Legal status
- Legal status: AU: S4 (Prescription only); US: ℞-only

Identifiers
- CAS Number: 2227979-41-9
- KEGG: D11389

Dutasteride/tamsulosin, sold under the brand name Jalyn among others, is a medication produced by GlaxoSmithKline for the treatment of adult male symptomatic benign prostatic hyperplasia (BPH). It is a combination of two previously existing medications: dutasteride, brand name Avodart, and tamsulosin, brand name Flomax. It contains 0.5 mg of dutasteride and 0.4 mg of tamsulosin hydrochloride.

Jalyn was the result of the CombAT (Combination of Avodart and Tamsulosin) trial of 2008. It was approved by the U.S. Food and Drug Administration (FDA) on June 14, 2010. In June 2011, the FDA approved a label change to warn of "Increased Risk of High-grade Prostate Cancer" from Jalyn.
