= C15H17NO =

The molecular formula C_{15}H_{17}NO (molar mass: 227.30 g/mol, exact mass: 227.1310 u) may refer to:

- AS-601811
- Naphthylmetrazine
- PPPA, or 3-phenoxy-3-phenylpropan-1-amine
- Prodan
