= Omnic =

Omnic may refer to:

- Omnic, a brand name of the drug Tamsulosin
- OMNIC, a software suite developed by Thermo Fisher Scientific
- Omnics, a fictional race of robots within the Overwatch franchise
