= Valoneic acid dilactone =

- Chemical structure of valoneic acid dilactone

Names
- Preferred IUPAC name 3,4,5-Trihydroxy-2-[(3,7,8-trihydroxy-5,10-dioxo-5,10-dihydro[1]benzopyrano[5,4,3-cde][1]benzopyran-2-yl)oxy]benzoate
- Other names Valoneic acid bislactone Valoneic acid bilactone

Identifiers
| CAS Number | 60202-70-2 |
| 3D model (JSmol) | Interactive image |
| ChemSpider | 8327382 |
| PubChem CID | 10151874 |
| UNII | UH5C3DT5LR |
| CompTox Dashboard (EPA) | DTXSID60436184 |
- InChI: InChI=1S/C21H10O13/c22-7-2-6(19(28)29)16(15(27)12(7)24)32-9-3-5-11-10-4(20(30)34-18(11)14(9)26)1-8(23)13(25)17(10)33-21(5)31/h1-3,22-27H,(H,28,29) Key: BPAOAXAAABIQKR-UHFFFAOYSA-N; InChI=1/C21H10O13/c22-7-2-6(19(28)29)16(15(27)12(7)24)32-9-3-5-11-10-4(20(30)34-18(11)14(9)26)1-8(23)13(25)17(10)33-21(5)31/h1-3,22-27H,(H,28,29) Key: BPAOAXAAABIQKR-UHFFFAOYAM
- SMILES: Oc1cc5c(=O)oc3c(O)c(Oc4c(C(=O)O)cc(O)c(O)c4O)cc2c3c5c(c1O)oc2=O

Properties
| Chemical formula | C_{21}H_{10}O_{13} |
| Molar mass | 470.28 g/mol |
- Except where otherwise noted, data are given for materials in their standard state (at 25 °C [77 °F], 100 kPa). verify (what is ?) Infobox references

Valoneic acid dilactone is a hydrolysable tannin that can be isolated from the heartwood of Shorea laevifolia and in oaks species like the North American white oak (Quercus alba) and European red oak (Quercus robur).

It shows an inhibitory effect on 5α-reductase, an enzyme involved in steroids metabolism and prostate cancer.
