= Neurosteroidogenesis inhibitor =

A neurosteroidogenesis inhibitor is a drug that inhibits the production of endogenous neurosteroids. Neurosteroids include the excitatory neurosteroids pregnenolone sulfate, dehydroepiandrosterone (DHEA), and dehydroepiandrosterone sulfate (DHEA-S), and the inhibitory neurosteroids allopregnanolone, tetrahydrodeoxycorticosterone (THDOC), and 3α-androstanediol, among others. By inhibiting the synthesis of endogenous neurosteroids, neurosteroidogenesis inhibitors have effects in the central nervous system.

Inhibitory neurosteroids are biosynthesized from steroid hormones by the action of two enzymes, 5α-reductase and 3α-hydroxysteroid dehydrogenase (3α-HSD). These enzymes can be inhibited by 5α-reductase inhibitors such as finasteride and dutasteride and by inhibitors of 3α-HSD such as medroxyprogesterone acetate. Contrarily, 3α-HSD is induced to varying extents by certain selective serotonin reuptake inhibitors (SSRIs), including fluoxetine, fluvoxamine, sertraline, and paroxetine, as well as by certain other antidepressants like venlafaxine and mirtazapine, and these antidepressants have been found to increase inhibitory neurosteroid levels. Some SSRI antidepressants, such as fluoxetine, sertraline, and paroxetine, have been observed to exert this effect at concentrations that are inactive on serotonin reuptake. Inhibition of inhibitory neurosteroid biosynthesis by 5α-reductase inhibitors and 3α-HSD inhibitors has been associated with depression, anxiety, irritability, and sexual dysfunction, whereas enhancement of their biosynthesis has been implicated in the antidepressant and anxiolytic effects of some of the SSRIs.

Inhibitors of cholesterol side-chain cleavage enzyme (P450scc), such as aminoglutethimide and ketoconazole, may block production of both excitatory and inhibitory neurosteroids, while CYP17A1 (17α-hydroxylase/17,20 lyase) inhibitors, such as abiraterone acetate, may mainly block production of excitatory neurosteroids. Antigonadotropins may also have the effect of lowering circulating neurosteroid levels.

The translocator protein (TSPO), also initially described as the peripheral benzodiazepine receptor (PBR), is a mitochondrial protein that is involved in neurosteroid biosynthesis. It is activated by certain benzodiazepines such as diazepam and midazolam, and via this action, inhibitory neurosteroid levels are increased. Selective TSPO activators, such as emapunil, are under investigation for clinical use as possible anxiolytics.

Progesterone, which is the endogenous precursor to the inhibitory neurosteroids 5α-dihydroprogesterone and allopregnanolone, as well as, more distantly, THDOC, when administered exogenously, has been found to behave as a prodrug to these neurosteroids, with clinical signs of their action, such as sedation, readily evident in humans. Exogenous pregnenolone has similarly been found to act as a prodrug of allopregnanolone.

Metyrapone, a reversible inhibitor of the enzyme steroid 11β-hydroxylase, may increase inhibitory neurosteroid levels. Conversely, it may inhibit the production of cortisol-derived excitatory neurosteroids.

Paracetamol (acetaminophen; Tylenol) has been shown to act at SULT2A1 (and potentially at SULT2B1) as an inhibitor of neurosteroidogenesis. Specifically, the production of sulfate-containing neurosteroids, such as DHEA-S and pregnenolone sulfate, were decreased in patients taking paracetamol.

== See also ==
- Steroidogenic enzyme
- Steroidogenesis inhibitor
- List of steroid metabolism modulators
