= Lapisteride =

Chemical compound

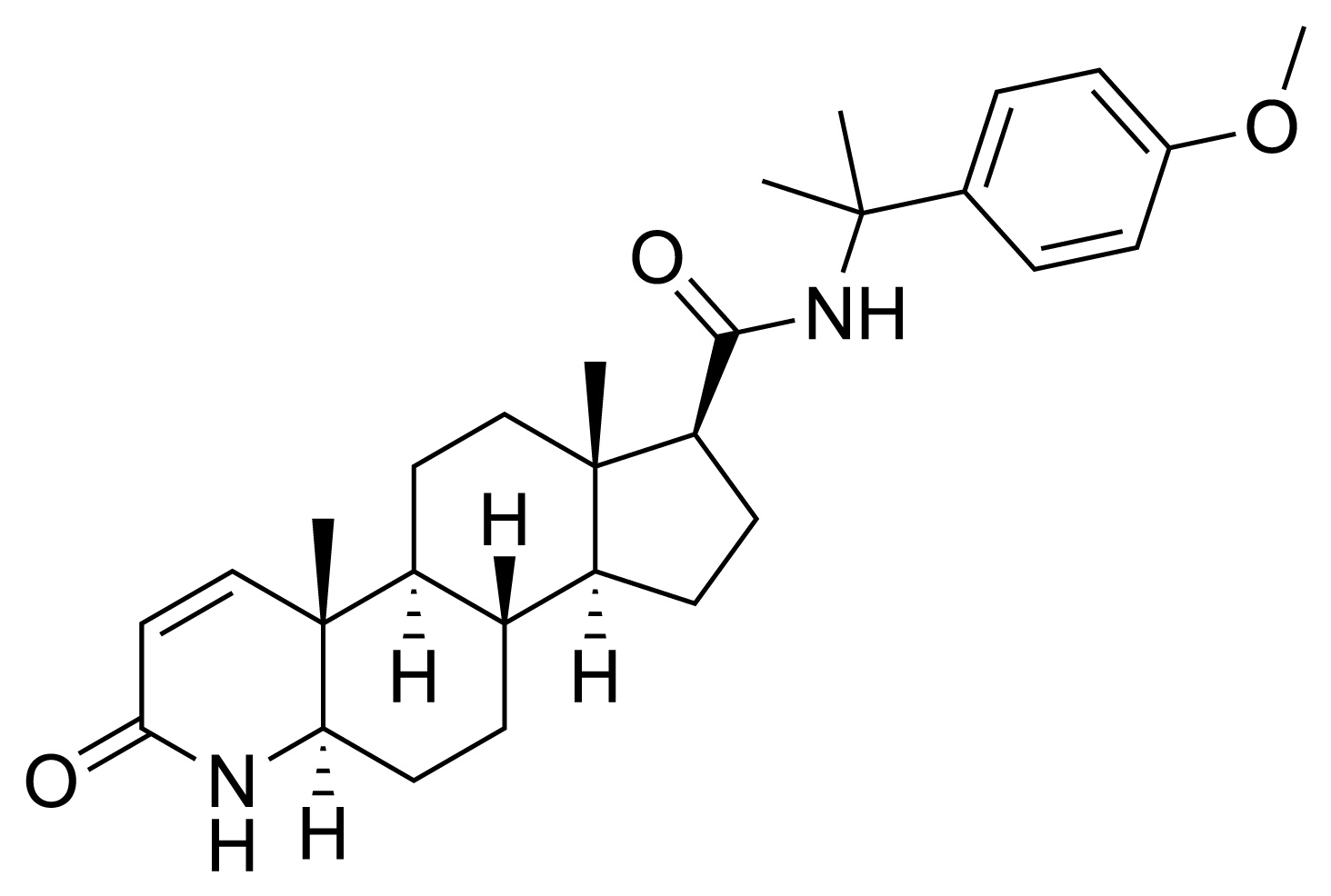

Clinical data
- Routes of administration: Oral
- ATC code: None

Legal status
- Legal status: In general: non-regulated

Identifiers
- IUPAC name: N-[1-(4-methoxyphenyl)-1-methylethyl]-3-oxo-4-aza-5α-androst-1-ene-17β-carboxamide
- CAS Number: 142139-60-4
- PubChem CID: 9847295
- ChemSpider: 8023009
- UNII: T50SJ23G82
- CompTox Dashboard (EPA): DTXSID801029879

Chemical and physical data
- Formula: C_{29}H_{40}N_{2}O_{3}
- Molar mass: 464.650 g·mol^{−1}
- 3D model (JSmol): Interactive image
- SMILES: O=C(NC(c1ccc(OC)cc1)(C)C)[C@@H]3[C@]2(CC[C@H]4[C@H]([C@@H]2CC3)CC[C@H]5NC(=O)\C=C/[C@]45C)C
- InChI: InChI=1S/C29H40N2O3/c1-27(2,18-6-8-19(34-5)9-7-18)31-26(33)23-12-11-21-20-10-13-24-29(4,17-15-25(32)30-24)22(20)14-16-28(21,23)3/h6-9,15,17,20-24H,10-14,16H2,1-5H3,(H,30,32)(H,31,33)/t20-,21-,22-,23+,24+,28-,29+/m0/s1; Key:NAGKTIAFDQEFJI-DPMIIFTQSA-N

Lapisteride (INN; CS-891) is a dual inhibitor of both isoforms of the enzyme 5α-reductase. It was under investigation for the treatment of benign prostatic hyperplasia (BPH) and androgenic alopecia, but was never marketed.

== See also ==
- 5α-Reductase inhibitor
