= Tamsulosin =

Medication

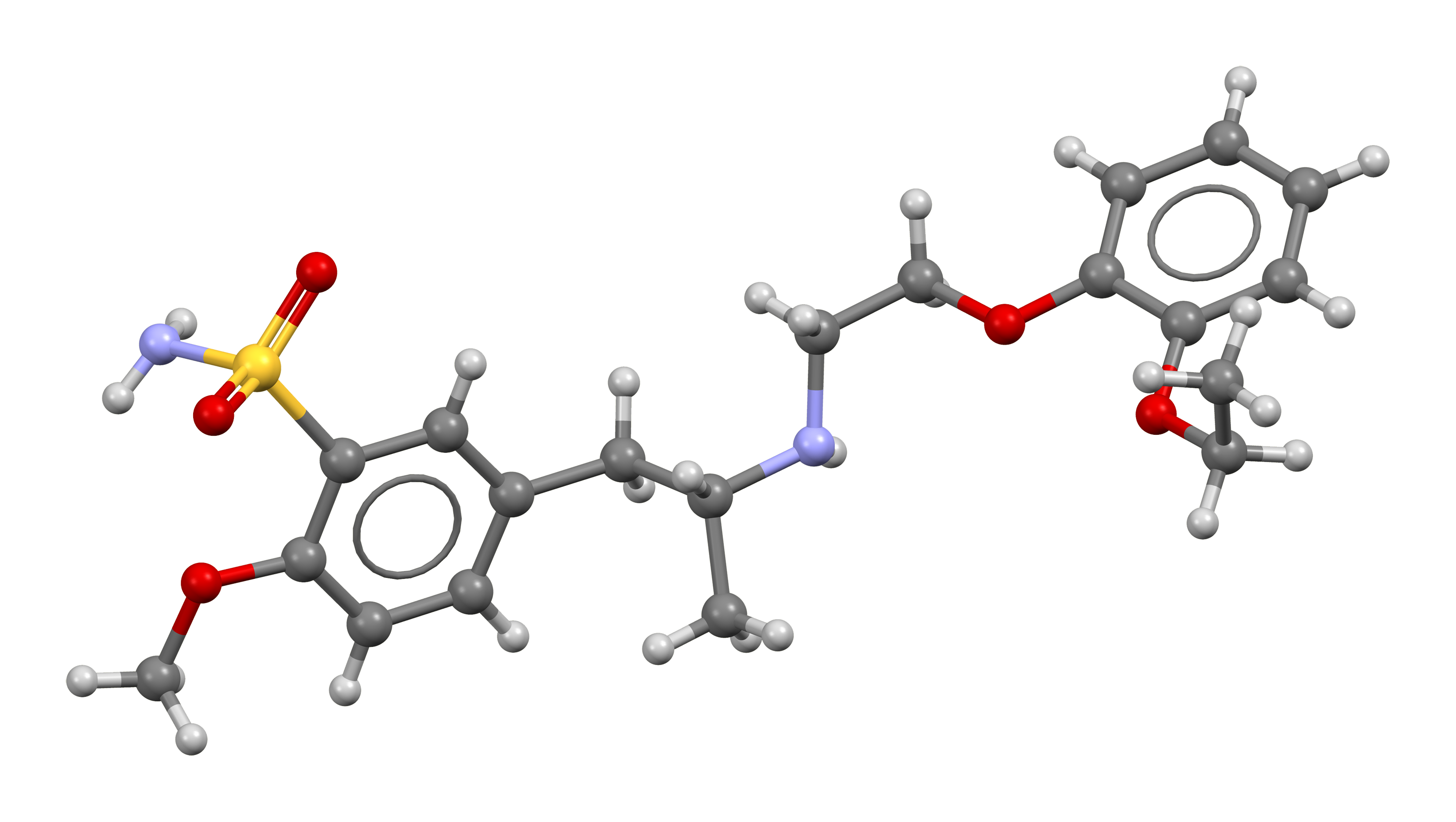

Clinical data
- Pronunciation: /tæmˈsuːləsən/ tam-SOO-lə-sən
- Trade names: Flomax, others
- AHFS/Drugs.com: Monograph
- MedlinePlus: a698012
- License data: US DailyMed: Tamsulosin
- Pregnancy category: AU: B2
- Routes of administration: By mouth
- Drug class: α_{1} blocker
- ATC code: G04CA02 (WHO)

Legal status
- Legal status: AU: S4 (Prescription only); CA: ℞-only; UK: OTC; US: ℞-only

Pharmacokinetic data
- Bioavailability: 100% (by mouth)
- Metabolism: Liver
- Elimination half-life: 9–13 hours
- Excretion: 76% Kidney

Identifiers
- IUPAC name: (R)-5-(2-{[2-(2-Ethoxyphenoxy)ethyl]amino}propyl)-2-methoxybenzene-1-sulfonamide
- CAS Number: 106133-20-4
- PubChem CID: 129211
- IUPHAR/BPS: 488
- DrugBank: DB00706
- ChemSpider: 114457
- UNII: G3P28OML5I
- KEGG: D08560; as HCl: D01024
- ChEBI: CHEBI:9398
- ChEMBL: ChEMBL836
- CompTox Dashboard (EPA): DTXSID3023631
- ECHA InfoCard: 100.109.780

Chemical and physical data
- Formula: C_{20}H_{28}N_{2}O_{5}S
- Molar mass: 408.51 g·mol^{−1}
- 3D model (JSmol): Interactive image
- SMILES: CCOc1ccccc1OCCN[C@@H](C)Cc1ccc(OC)c(c1)S(=O)(=O)N
- InChI: InChI=1S/C20H28N2O5S/c1-4-26-17-7-5-6-8-18(17)27-12-11-22-15(2)13-16-9-10-19(25-3)20(14-16)28(21,23)24/h5-10,14-15,22H,4,11-13H2,1-3H3,(H2,21,23,24)/t15-/m1/s1; Key:DRHKJLXJIQTDTD-OAHLLOKOSA-N

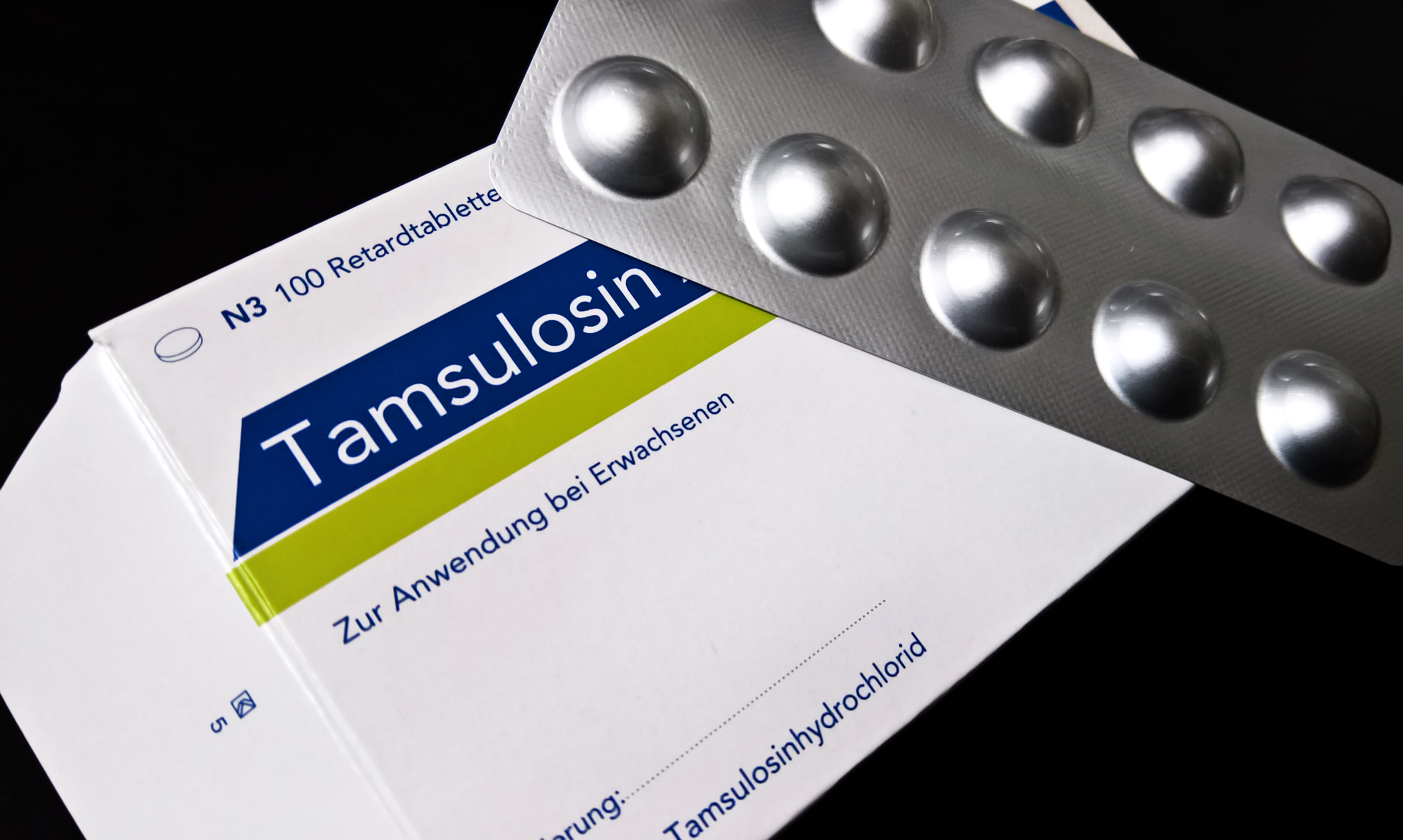
Tamsulosin – ARISTO Pharma – 0.4 mg prolonged-release tablets – Urologikum

Tamsulosin, sold under the brand name Flomax among others, is a medication used to treat symptomatic benign prostatic hyperplasia and chronic prostatitis. It is also used to help with the passage of kidney stones. The evidence for benefit with a kidney stone is better when the stone is larger. Tamsulosin is taken by mouth.

Common side effects include dizziness, headache, insomnia, nausea, blurry vision, and sexual problems. Other side effects may include feeling lightheaded with standing due to changes in blood pressure, and angioedema. Tamsulosin is an alpha blocker and works by relaxing muscles in the prostate. Specifically it is an α_{1}-adrenergic receptor blocker.

Tamsulosin was approved for medical use in the United States in 1997. It is available as a generic medication. In 2024, it was the 24th most commonly prescribed medication in the United States, with more than 22 million prescriptions.

== Medical uses ==
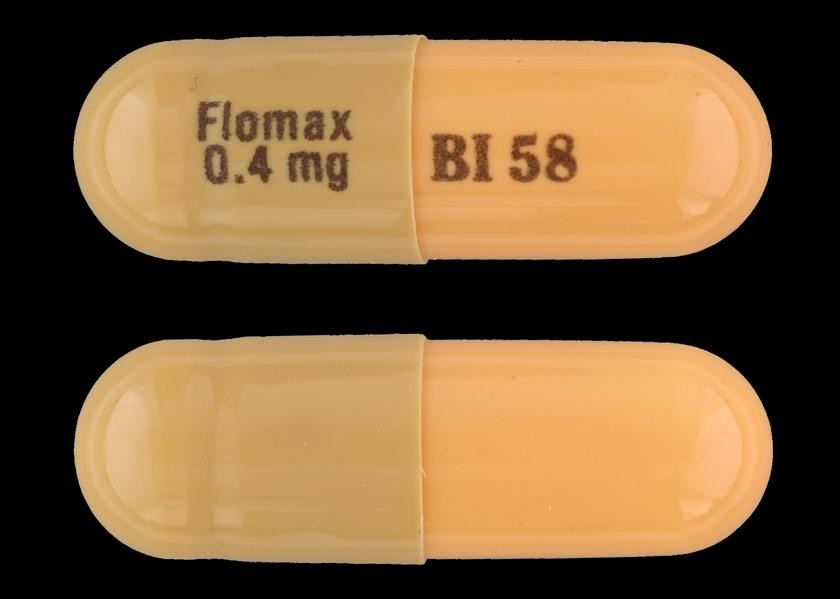
Flomax 0.4 mg oral capsule

Tamsulosin is used for benign prostatic hyperplasia and to help with the passage of kidney stones. Tamsulosin, however, appears to be effective for stones more than 4 mm and less than 10 mm only.

Tamsulosin is also used as an add-on treatment for acute urinary retention. Men may void more successfully after catheter removal if they are taking tamsulosin, and are less likely to need repeat catheterization.

Tamsulosin does not decrease the overall size of the prostate in men with benign prostatic hyperplasia and is not recommended for the prevention of prostate cancer.

=== Combination therapy ===
The results of the CombAT (combination of dutasteride (Avodart) and tamsulosin (Duodart)) trial in 2008 demonstrated that treatment with the combination of dutasteride and tamsulosin provides greater symptom benefits compared to monotherapy with either agent alone for treatment of benign prostatic hyperplasia. The combination medication dutasteride/tamsulosin (Jalyn) was approved by the US Food and Drug Administration (FDA) in June 2010.

== Adverse effects ==
- Eyes: People taking tamsulosin are prone to a complication known as floppy iris syndrome during cataract surgery. Adverse outcomes of the surgery are greatly reduced by the surgeon's prior knowledge of the person's history with this drug, and thus having the option of alternative techniques.
- Severe hypotension.
- Alpha-blockers, including prazosin, terazosin, doxazosin, or tamsulosin, do not appear to affect all-cause mortality in heart failure rehospitalization in those also receiving β-blockers.
- Tamsulosin can also cause retrograde ejaculation, which occurs when semen is redirected to the urinary bladder instead of being ejaculated normally. This is because tamsulosin relaxes the muscles of the urethral sphincters, which are normally closed during ejaculation.

== Mechanism ==
Tamsulosin is a selective α_{1} receptor antagonist that has preferential selectivity for the α_{1A} receptor in the prostate versus the α_{1B} receptor in the blood vessels.

It may also have activity at the α_{1D} receptor.

When alpha 1 receptors in the bladder neck, prostate, ureter, and urethra are blocked, a relaxation in smooth muscle tissue results. This mechanism decreases resistance to urinary flow, reduces discomfort associated with benign prostatic hyperplasia, and facilitates passage of kidney stones.

== Society and culture ==
=== Brand names ===
Tamsulosin was first sold in 1997 under the brand name Flomax. The US patent expired in October 2009. The US Food and Drug Administration (FDA) approved generic versions in March 2010.

It is sold by various companies, including Boehringer Ingelheim and CSL. Tamsulosin hydrochloride extended-release capsules are sold under the brand names Urimax 0.4 (India), Tamlocept 0.4 (India), Flomax, Flomaxtra, Contiflo XL, bestflo, Mecir LP (France), Urimax, Pamsvax, and Pradif, although generic, unmodified-release capsules are still approved and sold in many countries (such as Canada). Generic extended-release tablets are sold in most countries of the European Economic Area (EEA). In Mexico, it is sold as Secotex, as Harnal D in Japan and Indonesia, and as Harnal OCAS (oral controlled absorption system) in Thailand. In Egypt, Italy, Russia and Iceland, it is sold under the brand name Omnic by Astellas Pharma Europe. Tamsulosin hydrochloride is sold in Bangladesh under the brand names Uromax, Prostanil MR, Tamisol MR, and Tamsin. It is available to patients in the UK on National Health Service prescription (prescribed without brand name, at nominal or no cost to patients), and in 2010 became available for over-the-counter purchase without prescription.
