= Epristeride =

Chemical compound

Clinical data
- Trade names: Aipuliete, Chuanliu
- Other names: ONO-9302; SKF-105657; 17β-(tert-Butylcarbamoyl)androsta-3,5-diene-3-carboxylic acid
- Routes of administration: By mouth
- Drug class: 5α-Reductase inhibitor
- ATC code: None

Legal status
- Legal status: In general: ℞ (Prescription only)

Pharmacokinetic data
- Bioavailability: 93%
- Elimination half-life: 26 hours

Identifiers
- IUPAC name: (8S,9S,10R,13S,14S,17S)-17-(tert-butylcarbamoyl)-10,13-dimethyl-2,7,8,9,11,12,14,15,16,17-decahydro-1H-cyclopenta[a]phenanthrene-3-carboxylic acid
- CAS Number: 119169-78-7
- PubChem CID: 68741
- DrugBank: DB19810
- ChemSpider: 10625794
- UNII: 39517A04PS
- ChEMBL: ChEMBL290823
- CompTox Dashboard (EPA): DTXSID9048643

Chemical and physical data
- Formula: C_{25}H_{37}NO_{3}
- Molar mass: 399.575 g·mol^{−1}
- 3D model (JSmol): Interactive image
- SMILES: CC(C)(C)NC(=O)C1CCC2C3C\C=C4\C=C(/CCC4(C)C3CCC12C)C(O)=O
- InChI: InChI=1S/C25H37NO3/c1-23(2,3)26-21(27)20-9-8-18-17-7-6-16-14-15(22(28)29)10-12-24(16,4)19(17)11-13-25(18,20)5/h6,14,17-20H,7-13H2,1-5H3,(H,26,27)(H,28,29); Key:VAPSMQAHNAZRKC-UHFFFAOYSA-N

Epristeride, sold under the brand names Aipuliete and Chuanliu, is a medication which is used in the treatment of enlarged prostate in China. It is taken by mouth.

Epristeride is a 5α-reductase inhibitor and works by decreasing the production of dihydrotestosterone (DHT), an androgen sex hormone, in certain parts of the body like the prostate gland. It inhibits two of the three forms of 5α-reductase but is of relatively low efficacy and can decrease DHT levels in the blood only by about 25 to 54%.

Epristeride was under development for the treatment of enlarged prostate, scalp hair loss, and acne in the United States and other countries in the 1990s but did not complete development in these countries. Instead, it was developed and introduced for the treatment of enlarged prostate in China in 2000.

== Medical uses ==
Epristeride is used in the treatment of benign prostatic hyperplasia (BPH), otherwise known as enlarged prostate.

== Pharmacology ==
=== Pharmacodynamics ===
Epristeride is a selective, transition-state, non-competitive or uncompetitive, irreversible inhibitor of 5α-reductase, and is specific to the type II isoform of the enzyme similarly to finasteride and turosteride but unlike dutasteride.

Epristeride is unique in its mechanism of action relative to finasteride and dutasteride in that it binds irreversibly to 5α-reductase and results in the formation of an unproductive complex of the 5α-reductase enzyme, the substrate testosterone, and the cofactor NADPH. For this reason, testosterone is caught in a trap, and it was initially speculated that the reciprocal increase in intraprostatic levels of testosterone seen with finasteride and dutasteride should not happen with epristeride. However, subsequent clinical data have not supported this hypothesis. Moreover, in spite of the fact that epristeride is a very potent inhibitor of 5α-reductase type II (0.18–2 nM), it has been found to reduce circulating levels of dihydrotestosterone (DHT) by only 25 to 54% following 8 days of therapy over a dosage range of 0.4 to 160 mg/day. For this reason, relative to other 5α-reductase inhibitors like finasteride and dutasteride, the degree of DHT suppression with epristeride falls short of that desirable for full clinical benefit.

=== Pharmacokinetics ===
The oral bioavailability of epristeride is 93%. It has an elimination half-life of 26 hours.

== Chemistry ==
Epristeride, also known as 17β-(tert-butylcarbamoyl)androsta-3,5-diene-3-carboxylic acid, is a synthetic androstane steroid.

=== Synthesis ===

Oxidation of the acetyl group in progesterone gives the carboxylic acid (1). Halogenation with phosphorus tribromide converts the enone to the enol bromide and the acid to the acyl halide; mild base hydrolyzes the latter back to the free acid, giving (2). Halogenation with oxalyl chloride and a Schotten–Baumann reaction with tert-butylamine yields the amide (3). Epristeride is formed when the bromine atom in this compound is converted to a carboxylic acid via the organolithium intermediate (4).

== History ==
Epristeride was under development for the treatment of BPH, androgenic alopecia (pattern hair loss), and acne vulgaris by SmithKline Beecham (now GlaxoSmithKline) in the 1990s and reached phase III clinical trials in the United States, United Kingdom, and Japan, but ultimately was never marketed in these countries. Instead, epristeride was developed by Ono Pharmaceutical and introduced for the treatment of BPH in China in 2000.

== Society and culture ==
=== Generic names ===
Epristeride is the generic name of the drug and its INN, USAN, BAN, and JAN.

=== Brand names ===
Epristeride is marketed under the brand names Aipuliete and Chuanliu in China.
