= Azasteroid =

Class of chemical compounds

An azasteroid is a type of steroid derivative which has one of the carbon atoms in the steroid ring system replaced by a nitrogen atom. Two azasteroids, finasteride and dutasteride, are used clinically as 5α-reductase inhibitors.

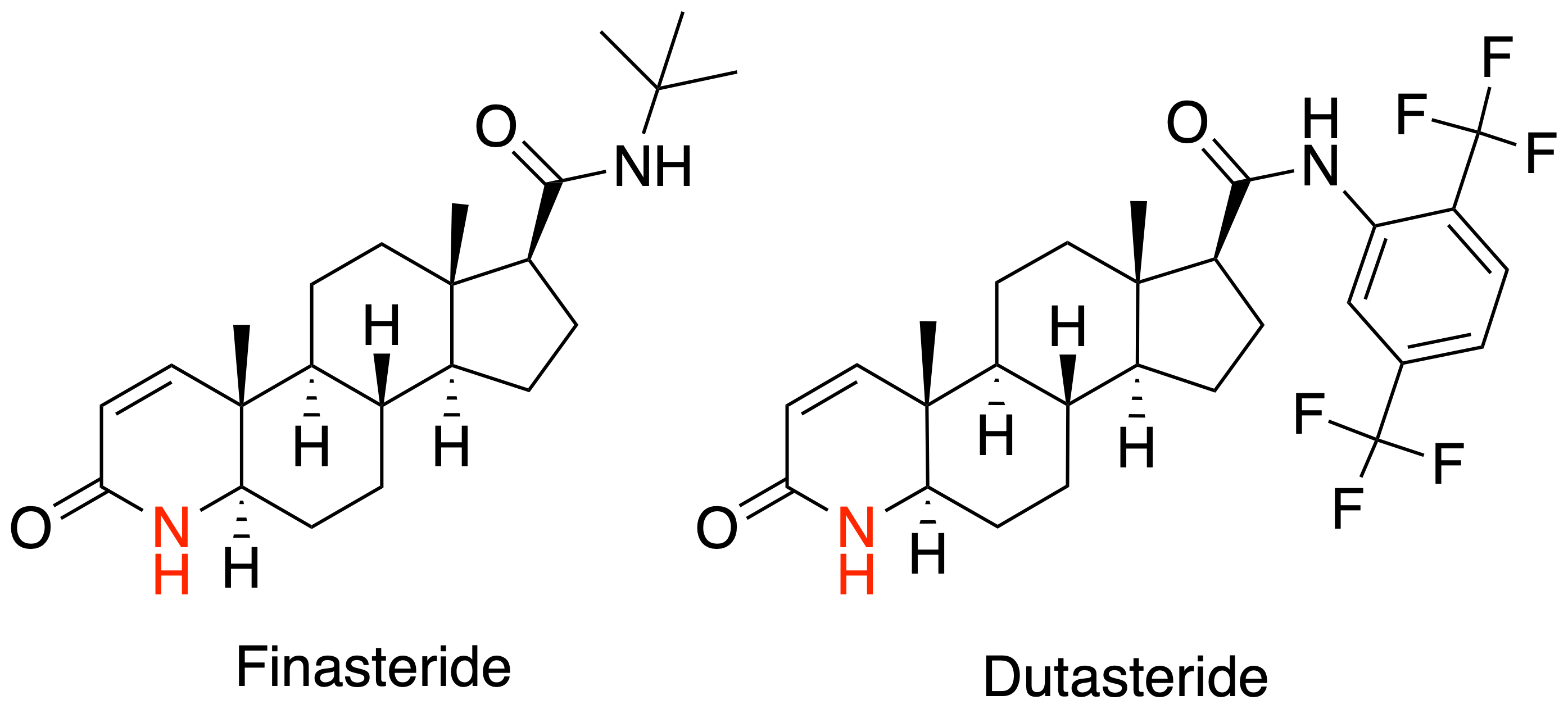
Finasteride and dutasteride, two azasteroid pharmaceutical drugs. The nitrogen atoms in each ring system are highlighted in red.

Some of the 6-azasteroids may prove to be useful drugs, but have yet to reach the pharmaceutical market.
