= SRD5A2 =

Protein-coding gene in the species Homo sapiens

Identifiers
- Aliases: SRD5A2, entrez:6716, steroid 5 alpha-reductase 2
- External IDs: OMIM: 607306; MGI: 2150380; GeneCards: SRD5A2
Enzyme activity
EC #	BRENDA	ExPASy	KEGG	MetaCyc
1.3.1.22	↗	↗	↗	↗

Gene location (Human)
Chr.	Chromosome 2 (human)
Band	2p23.1	Start	31,522,480 bp
Band	2p23.1	End	31,580,938 bp

Gene location (Mouse)
Chr.	Chromosome 17 (mouse)
Band	17|17 E2	Start	74,323,950 bp
Band	17|17 E2	End	74,354,911 bp
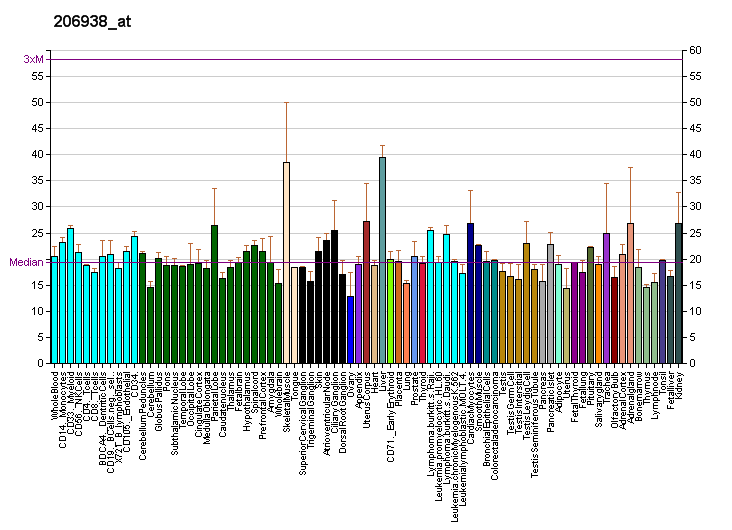
RNA expression pattern
Bgee	Human / Mouse (ortholog); Top expressed in: corpus epididymis; bronchial epithelial cell; right uterine tube; liver; buccal mucosa cell; right lobe of liver; caput epididymis; prostate; seminal vesicula; mucosa of paranasal sinus / Top expressed in: adrenal gland; olfactory epithelium; lamina propria of prostatic urethra; epithelium of lens; right kidney; lamina propria of vagina; proximal tubule; embryo; lateral lobe of prostate; ejaculatory duct; More reference expression data
BioGPS	More reference expression data
Gene ontology
Molecular function	oxidoreductase activity, acting on the CH-CH group of donors; sterol 5-alpha reductase activity; cholestenone 5-alpha-reductase activity; amide binding; oxidoreductase activity; 3-oxo-5-alpha-steroid 4-dehydrogenase activity; testosterone dehydrogenase [NAD(P) activity]
Cellular component	cytoplasm; organelle membrane; integral component of membrane; membrane; cell body fiber; intracellular membrane-bounded organelle; soma; endoplasmic reticulum; endoplasmic reticulum membrane
Biological process	cell differentiation; male gonad development; phthalate metabolic process; biphenyl metabolic process; response to organic cyclic compound; lipid metabolism; response to testosterone; response to steroid hormone; cell-cell signaling; response to peptide hormone; sex differentiation; response to organic substance; steroid catabolic process; response to nutrient levels; dibenzo-p-dioxin metabolic process; hypothalamus development; bone development; hippocampus development; response to follicle-stimulating hormone; androgen metabolic process; steroid metabolic process; androgen biosynthetic process; male genitalia development; female genitalia development; progesterone metabolic process; testosterone biosynthetic process; steroid biosynthetic process
Sources:Amigo / QuickGO
Orthologs
Databases	NCBI: entry; OMA: entry
Species	Human	Mouse
Entrez	6716	94224
Ensembl	ENSG00000277893	ENSMUSG00000038541
UniProt	P31213	Q99N99
RefSeq (mRNA)	NM_000348	NM_053188
RefSeq (protein)	NP_000339	NP_444418
Location (UCSC)	Chr 2: 31.52 – 31.58 Mb	Chr 17: 74.32 – 74.35 Mb
PubMed search
- Wikidata
View/Edit Human	View/Edit Mouse

The human gene SRD5A2 encodes the 3-oxo-5α-steroid 4-dehydrogenase 2 enzyme, also known as 5α-reductase type 2 (5αR2), one of three isozymes of 5α-reductase.

5αR2 catalyzes the conversion of the male sex hormone testosterone into the more potent androgen, dihydrotestosterone.

5αR2 is a microsomal protein expressed at high levels in androgen-sensitive tissues such as the prostate. The enzyme is active at acidic pH and is sensitive to the 4-azasteroid inhibitor finasteride. Deficiencies in 5αR2 activity of the can lead to a condition known as 5α-reductase 2 deficiency, which is a cause of 46,XY DSD that presents as atypical male genitalia.

== See also ==
- 5α-Reductase
