= SRD5A1 =

Protein-coding gene in the species Homo sapiens

Identifiers
- Aliases: SRD5A1, S5AR 1, steroid 5 alpha-reductase 1
- External IDs: OMIM: 184753; MGI: 98400; GeneCards: SRD5A1
Enzyme activity
| EC # | BRENDA | ExPASy | KEGG | MetaCyc |
|---|---|---|---|---|
| 1.3.1.22 | ↗ | ↗ | ↗ | ↗ |

Gene location (Human)
| Chr. | Chromosome 5 (human) |
| Band | 5p15.31 | Start | 6,633,427 bp |
| Band | 5p15.31 | End | 6,674,386 bp |

Gene location (Mouse)
| Chr. | Chromosome 13 (mouse) |
| Band | 13 B3|13 35.55 cM | Start | 69,721,568 bp |
| Band | 13 B3|13 35.55 cM | End | 69,759,561 bp |
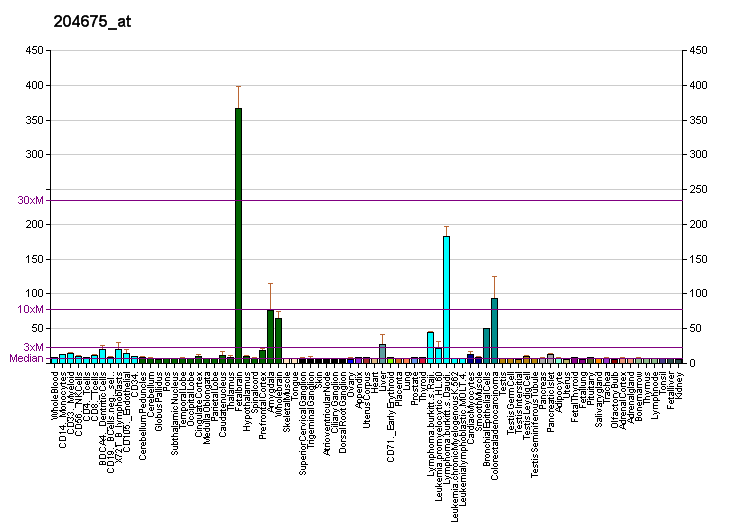

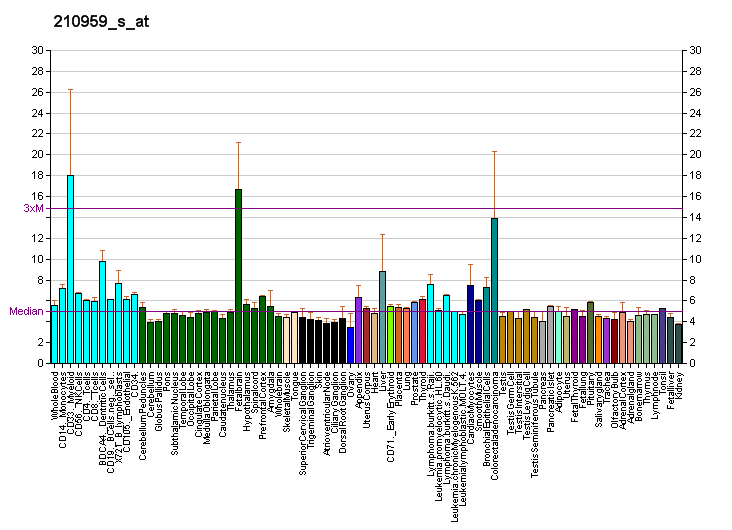

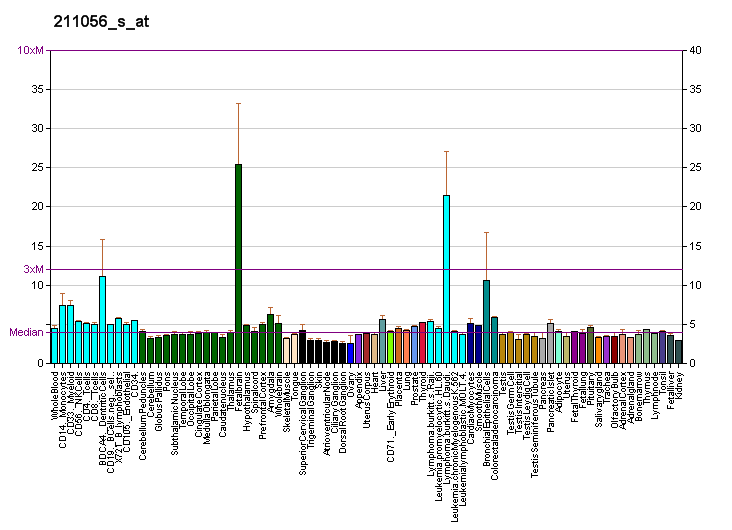
RNA expression pattern
| Bgee | Human / Mouse (ortholog); Top expressed in: skin of thigh; endothelial cell; gingival epithelium; vulva; hair follicle; Brodmann area 23; jejunal mucosa; skin of arm; right lobe of liver; oral cavity / Top expressed in: transitional epithelium of urinary bladder; gastrula; decidua; left lobe of liver; genital tubercle; otolith organ; utricle; otic vesicle; right kidney; interventricular septum; More reference expression data |
| BioGPS | More reference expression data |
Gene ontology
| Molecular function | oxidoreductase activity, acting on the CH-CH group of donors; cholestenone 5-alpha-reductase activity; amide binding; NADPH binding; electron transfer activity; oxidoreductase activity; 3-oxo-5-alpha-steroid 4-dehydrogenase activity |
| Cellular component | cytoplasm; integral component of membrane; organelle membrane; endoplasmic reticulum membrane; cell body fiber; membrane; myelin sheath; intracellular membrane-bounded organelle; soma; endoplasmic reticulum; perinuclear region of cytoplasm |
| Biological process | response to fungicide; cell differentiation; pituitary gland development; male gonad development; response to estradiol; response to organic cyclic compound; circadian sleep/wake cycle, REM sleep; androgen metabolic process; thalamus development; lipid metabolism; cellular response to testosterone stimulus; diterpenoid metabolic process; response to testosterone; cellular response to starvation; cellular response to growth factor stimulus; cellular response to estradiol stimulus; cellular response to organic cyclic compound; sex differentiation; serotonin metabolic process; cellular response to dexamethasone stimulus; response to estrogen; cellular response to epinephrine stimulus; sex-determination system; response to growth hormone; spinal cord development; hypothalamus development; cerebral cortex development; cellular response to insulin stimulus; urogenital system development; liver development; bone development; hippocampus development; response to muscle activity; response to follicle-stimulating hormone; cellular response to cAMP; steroid metabolic process; androgen biosynthetic process; male genitalia development; female genitalia development; progesterone metabolic process; steroid biosynthetic process; electron transport chain; androgen catabolic process |
Sources:Amigo / QuickGO
Orthologs
| Databases | NCBI: entry; OMA: entry |
| Species | Human | Mouse |
| Entrez | 6715 | 78925 |
| Ensembl | ENSG00000145545 | ENSMUSG00000021594 |
| UniProt | P18405 | Q68FF9 |
| RefSeq (mRNA) | NM_001047; NM_001324322; NM_001324323 | NM_175283 |
| RefSeq (protein) | NP_001038; NP_001311251; NP_001311252 | NP_780492 |
| Location (UCSC) | Chr 5: 6.63 – 6.67 Mb | Chr 13: 69.72 – 69.76 Mb |
| PubMed search |
- Wikidata
| View/Edit Human | View/Edit Mouse |

3-Oxo-5α-steroid 4-dehydrogenase 1 is an enzyme that in humans is encoded by the SRD5A1 gene. It is one of three forms of steroid 5α-reductase.

Steroid 5α-reductase (EC 1.3.99.5) catalyzes, among other reactions, the conversion of testosterone into the more potent androgen, 5α-dihydrotestosterone (DHT). The SRD5A1, SRD5A2, and SRD5A3 genes in humans all encode 5α-reductase isozymes.

== Function ==
The 3-oxo-5α-steroid 4-dehydrogenase 1 enzyme is involved in bile acid biosynthesis, androgen and estrogen metabolism. For instance, the enzyme catalyzes the conversion of testosterone into the more potent androgen, 5α-dihydrotestosterone. It can also catalyze the conversion of progesterone, corticosterone or other steroids, to its corresponding 5α-3-oxo-steroids. This chemical reaction is called 5α-reduction, i.e. the reduction of the Δ5-4 double bond in steroids by catalyzing direct hydride transfer from NADPH to the carbon 5 position of the steroid substrate.

== Regulation ==
The SRD5A1 gene is particularly susceptible to epigenetic regulation, and responsive to environmental stressors at key stages during postnatal development. This regulation leads to increased DNA methylation at the gene's intronic enhancer, and its reduced expression, which have lasting effects on reproductive function.

ETV4 family members bind to ETS DNA-binding sites and both regulate their own expression and the transcription of a subset of genes that are dependent upon testicular luminal fluid factors, including Ggt_pr4, SRD5A1, and Gpx5.

Six-month dietary vitamin E deficiency in rats resulted in a twofold increase in the mRNA level of SRD5A1 gene and a twofold decrease in the mRNA level of GCLM gene but is not directly mediated by changes in promoter DNA methylation.

Insulin increases the expression of 5α-reductase type 1 mRNA via Akt signalling suggest that elevated levels of 5α-reduced androgens seen in hyperinsulinemic conditions might be explained on the basis of a stimulatory effect of insulin on 5α-reductase in granulosa cells leading to impaired follicle growth and ovulation.

== Clinical significance ==
Hyperinsulinemia acutely enhances ACTH effects on both the androgen and glucocorticoid pathways leading to changes in steroid metabolites molar ratios that suggest insulin stimulation of 5α-reductase activity.

Polyendocrine metabolic ovarian syndrome (PMOS) is associated with enhanced androgen and cortisol metabolite excretion and increased 5α-reductase activity that cannot be explained by obesity alone. Increased adrenal corticosteroid production represents an important pathogenic pathway in PMOS.

Progression to castration-resistant prostate cancer (CRPC) is accompanied by increased expression of SRD5A1 over SRD5A2, which is otherwise the dominant isoenzyme expressed in the prostate. The dominant route of DHT synthesis in human CRPC bypasses testosterone, and instead requires 5α-reduction of androstenedione by SRD5A1 to 5α-androstanedione, which is then converted to DHT fuelling cancer growth.

== Expression ==
SRD5A1 gene expression in human tissues, sorted by fragments per kilobase of exon model per million reads mapped (FPKM). The FPKM data is taken from a 2014 study.

In humans, the protein isozyme encoded by the SRD5A1 gene is expressed in esophagus, liver, skin and 24 other tissues.

== See also ==
- Steroidogenic enzyme
- 5α-Reductase
