= Finasteride =

Antiandrogen medication

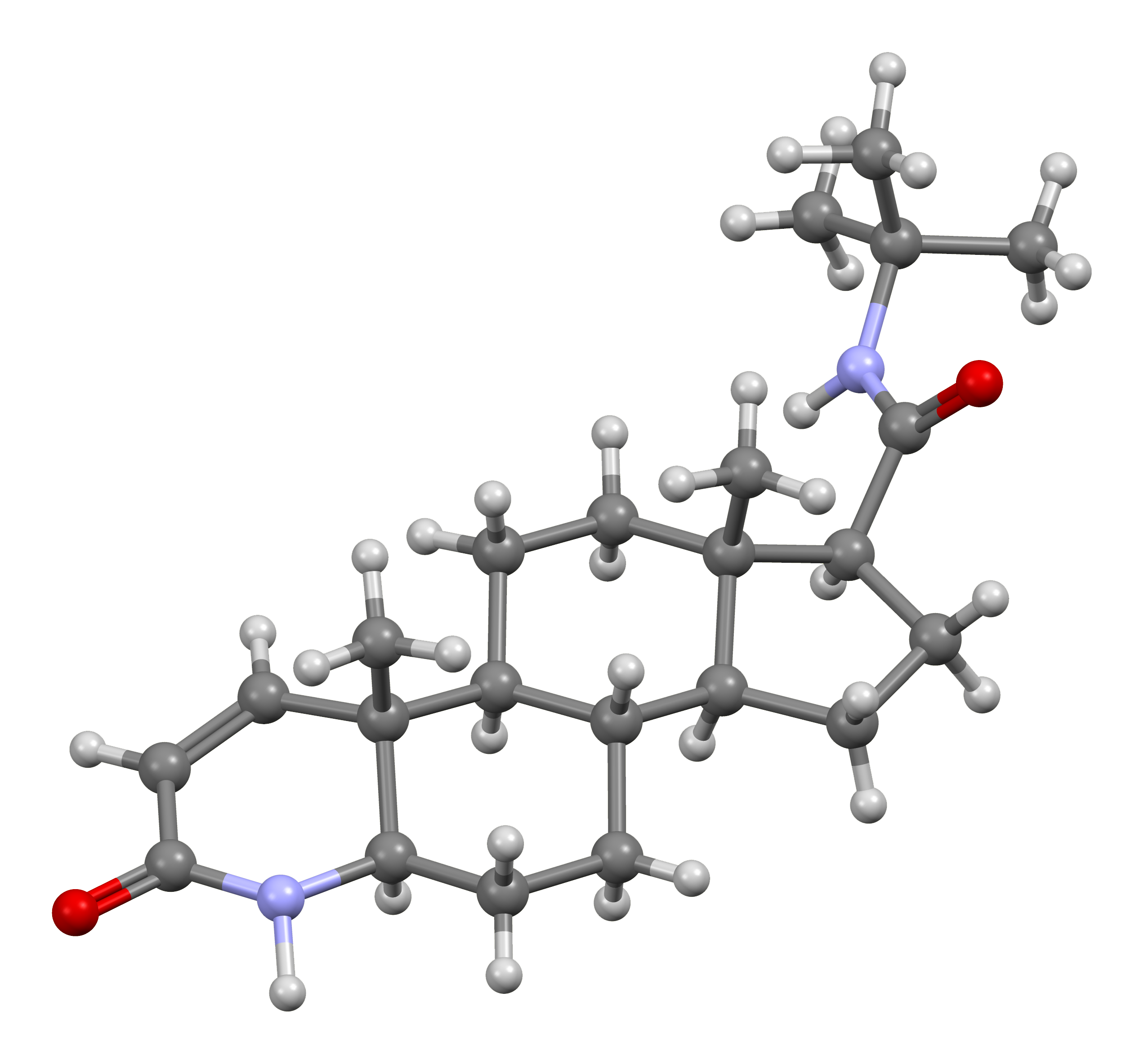

Clinical data
- Pronunciation: /fɪˈnæstəˌraɪd/ fi-NA-stə-RYDE
- Trade names: Proscar, Propecia, Finide, others
- Other names: MK-906; YM-152; L-652,931; 17β-(N-tert-Butylcarbamoyl)-4-aza-5α-androst-1-en-3-one; N-(1,1-Dimethylethyl)-3-oxo-4-aza-5α-androst-1-ene-17β-carboxamide
- AHFS/Drugs.com: Monograph
- MedlinePlus: a698016
- License data: US DailyMed: Finasteride
- Pregnancy category: AU: X (High risk)
- Routes of administration: By mouth, topical
- Drug class: 5α-Reductase inhibitor
- ATC code: G04CB01 (WHO) D11AX10 (WHO)

Legal status
- Legal status: AU: S4 (Prescription only); CA: ℞-only; UK: POM (Prescription only); US: ℞-only

Pharmacokinetic data
- Bioavailability: 65%
- Protein binding: 90%
- Metabolism: Liver (CYP3A4, ALDH)
- Elimination half-life: Adults: 5–6 hours Elderly: >8 hours
- Excretion: Feces: 57% Urine: 40%

Identifiers
- IUPAC name: (1S,3aS,3bS,5aR,9aR,9bS,11aS)-N-tert-butyl-9a,11a-dimethyl-7-oxo-1,2,3,3a,3b,4,5,5a,6,9b,10,11-dodecahydroindeno[5,4-f]quinoline-1-carboxamide
- CAS Number: 98319-26-7
- PubChem CID: 57363
- IUPHAR/BPS: 6818
- DrugBank: DB01216
- ChemSpider: 51714
- UNII: 57GNO57U7G
- KEGG: D00321
- ChEBI: CHEBI:5062
- ChEMBL: ChEMBL710
- CompTox Dashboard (EPA): DTXSID3020625
- ECHA InfoCard: 100.149.445

Chemical and physical data
- Formula: C_{23}H_{36}N_{2}O_{2}
- Molar mass: 372.553 g·mol^{−1}
- 3D model (JSmol): Interactive image
- SMILES: O=C(NC(C)(C)C)[C@@H]2[C@]1(CC[C@H]3[C@H]([C@@H]1CC2)CC[C@H]4NC(=O)\C=C/[C@]34C)C
- InChI: InChI=1S/C23H36N2O2/c1-21(2,3)25-20(27)17-8-7-15-14-6-9-18-23(5,13-11-19(26)24-18)16(14)10-12-22(15,17)4/h11,13-18H,6-10,12H2,1-5H3,(H,24,26)(H,25,27)/t14-,15-,16-,17+,18+,22-,23+/m0/s1; Key:DBEPLOCGEIEOCV-WSBQPABSSA-N

Finasteride, sold under the brand names Proscar and Propecia among others, is a medication used to treat pattern hair loss and benign prostatic hyperplasia (BPH). It can also be used to treat excessive hair growth in women. It is usually taken orally but there are topical formulations for patients with hair loss, designed to minimize systemic exposure by acting specifically on hair follicles.

Finasteride is a widely dispensed 5α-reductase inhibitor. As such, it is an antiandrogen that works by decreasing the production of dihydrotestosterone (DHT) by about 70% in serum, 65-70% in scalp skin, 90% in prostate.

In addition to DHT, finasteride also inhibits the production of several anticonvulsant neurosteroids including allopregnanolone, androstanediol, and tetrahydrodeoxycorticosterone.

Adverse effects from finasteride are rare in men with already enlarged prostates; however, some men experience sexual dysfunction, depression, and breast enlargement. In some men, sexual dysfunction may persist after stopping the medication. It may also hide the early symptoms of certain forms of prostate cancer.

Finasteride was patented in 1984 and approved for medical use in 1992. It is available as a generic medication. In 2023, it was the 91st most commonly prescribed medication in the United States, with more than 7 million prescriptions.

== Medical uses ==
Finasteride has been used for the treatment of symptomatic benign prostatic hyperplasia (BPH) and for the treatment of male pattern hair loss.

=== Enlarged prostate ===
Physicians sometimes prescribe finasteride for the treatment of benign prostatic hyperplasia, informally known as an enlarged prostate. Finasteride may improve the symptoms associated with BPH such as difficulty urinating, getting up during the night to urinate, hesitation at the start and end of urination, and decreased urinary flow.

The use of the drug showed significant sexual adverse effects such as erectile dysfunction and less sexual desire, in particular when obstructive symptoms due to an enlarged prostate were present.

=== Pattern hair loss ===
Finasteride is also used to treat male pattern baldness (androgenic alopecia), a condition that develops in up to 80% of Caucasian men aged 70 and over. In the United States, finasteride and minoxidil are the only two FDA-approved drugs for the treatment of male pattern hair loss as of 2017. Treatment with finasteride slows further hair loss. Two meta-analyses found finasteride's efficacy caused about 15% hair regrowth. Specifically oral finasteride was observed to regrow about 18 hair follicles in a square centimeter area of scalp. In comparison a full head of hair usually has 120 hair follicles per square centimeter scalp.

Taking finasteride leads to a reduction in scalp and serum DHT levels; by lowering scalp levels of DHT, finasteride can maintain or increase the amount of terminal hairs in the anagen phase by inhibiting and sometimes reversing miniaturization of the hair follicle. Finasteride is most effective on the crown but can reduce hair loss in all areas of the scalp. Finasteride has also been tested for pattern hair loss in women; however, the results were no better than placebo. Finasteride is less effective in the treatment of scalp hair loss than dutasteride.

=== Prostate cancer ===
In males aged 55 years old and over finasteride decreases the risk of low-grade prostate cancer but may increase the risk of high-grade prostate cancer and has no effect on overall survival.

A 2010 review found a 25% reduction in the risk of prostate cancer with 5α-reductase inhibitors. A follow-up study of the Medicare claims of participants in a 10-year Prostate Cancer Prevention Trial suggests the reduction in prostate cancer is maintained even after discontinuation of treatment. However, 5α-reductase inhibitors have been found to increase the risk of developing certain rare but aggressive forms of prostate cancer (27% risk increase), although not all studies have observed this. No impact of 5-α-reductase inhibitor on survival has been found in people with prostate cancer.

=== Excessive hair growth ===
Finasteride has been found to be effective in the treatment of hirsutism (excessive facial or body hair growth) in women. In a study of 89 women with hyperandrogenism due to persistent adrenarche syndrome, finasteride produced a 93% reduction in facial hirsutism and a 73% reduction of bodily hirsutism after 2 years of treatment. Other studies using finasteride for hirsutism have also found it to be effective.

=== Transgender hormone therapy ===
Finasteride is sometimes used as an antiandrogen in feminizing hormone therapy for transfeminine people. There are limited clinical data on finasteride for this use and some authorities explicitly recommend against its routine use. Relatedly, the medication is considered to be limitedly useful and unnecessary in transfeminine people with testosterone levels in the normal female range. However, finasteride may be helpful in those with higher testosterone levels and symptoms like scalp hair loss and excessive body hair or who seek only partial feminization.

Besides transfeminine people, finasteride is helpful in transmasculine people for preventing scalp hair loss and is better-established for this purpose, though it might impede masculinization such as clitoral growth and development of facial and body hair.

== Adverse effects ==
A 2010 Cochrane review of finasteride for BPH found that, in men with a weighted mean age of 62.4, adverse effects are rare in men with already enlarged prostates; "nevertheless, men taking finasteride are at increased risk for impotence, erectile dysfunction, decreased libido, and ejaculation disorder, versus placebo." As of 2016, fresh evidence suggested such effects, along with disturbed neurosteroid production, may persist after finasteride use is stopped.

Finasteride is contraindicated in pregnancy. The US Food and Drug Administration (FDA) advises that donation of blood or plasma be deferred for at least one month after taking the last dose of finasteride.

The FDA has added a warning to 5α-reductase inhibitors concerning an increased risk of high-grade prostate cancer, as the treatment of BPH lowers PSA (prostate-specific antigen), which could mask the development of prostate cancer. Although overall incidence of male breast cancer in clinical trials for finasteride 5 mg was not increased, there are post-marketing reports of breast cancer in association with its use, though available evidence does not provide clarity as to whether there is a causative relationship between finasteride and these cancers. A 2018 meta-analysis found no higher risk of breast cancer with 5α-reductase inhibitors. Some men develop gynecomastia (breast development or enlargement) following finasteride usage. The risk of gynecomastia with 5α-reductase inhibitors is low at about 1.5%. Depressive symptoms and suicidality have been reported.

=== Sexual adverse effects ===
Use of finasteride is associated with an increased risk of sexual dysfunction including erectile dysfunction, decreased libido and ejaculatory dysfunction. Sexual adverse effects of finasteride and dutasteride have been linked to lower quality of life and ability to maintain an intimate relationship, and can cause stress in relationships.

The adverse effect profiles of finasteride are somewhat different for its indications of hair loss and BPH.

==== Finasteride for androgenetic alopecia (hair loss in men) ====
The most common adverse effects of finasteride taken for hair loss are a decrease in sex drive, erectile dysfunction, and a decrease in the amount of semen.

In addition, finasteride has been reported in case reports to cause sexual problems that persist after stopping the medication. A 2012 update to the FDA label noted reports of decreased sex drive, problems with ejaculation and difficulty achieving an erection which continued after stopping the medication. The update also referenced reports of testicular pain and "male infertility and/or poor quality of semen."

In 2025, the European Medicines Agency confirmed that suicidal thoughts can occur as a side effect of the hair-loss treatment finasteride and similar dutasteride. The majority of these reports involved patients taking the 1 mg dosage, typically prescribed for androgenetic alopecia, a hormone-related form of hair loss. However, the agency noted that the precise frequency of this adverse effect could not be determined from the data available. In October 2024, the EMA had initiated a review of both finasteride and dutasteride due to concerns over potential links to suicidal ideation. While finasteride—marketed by Organon as Propecia—already includes warnings about possible psychiatric effects, the EMA stated that the evidence did not support a similar link for dutasteride, sold by GSK under the brand name Avodart.

==== Finasteride for benign prostatic hyperplasia ====
The most common adverse sexual effects of finasteride for BPH are: trouble getting or keeping an erection, decrease in sex drive, decreased volume of ejaculate, and ejaculation disorders.

A 2010 Cochrane review found that men taking finasteride for BPH (with a mean age of 62.4) are at increased risk for impotence, erectile dysfunction (ED), decreased libido, and ejaculation disorder for the first year of treatment. The rates became indistinguishable from placebo after 2–4 years and these side effects usually got better over time.

=== Long-term ===
Finasteride may cause persistent adverse sexual, neurological, and physical effects in a subset of men. A 2019 systematic review surveyed the literature on the reversibility of finasteride's side effects. It identified three studies that demonstrated full reversibility of side effects and eleven that described patients with irreversible adverse events. A separate 2017 retrospective review of nearly 12,000 patients found 1.4% developed persistent (lasting at least 90 days after stopping Finasteride) ED, with this dropping to 0.8% for 16-42 year olds.

=== Post-finasteride syndrome ===
Reports of long-term, post-discontinuation adverse effects in some fraction of former finasteride users have led to a proposed post-finasteride syndrome (PFS), although some within the medical community question whether there is enough evidence to support a causal relationship between finasteride usage and persistent symptoms.

Individuals claiming to experience PFS report sexual, neurological, hormonal, and psychological side effects that persist for an extended period after stopping the drug. Reported symptoms include penile atrophy and tissue changes, decreased ejaculate volume and quality, reduced libido, erectile dysfunction, loss of penile sensitivity, decreased orgasm sensation, dry skin, metabolic changes, muscle and strength loss, gynecomastia, depression, anxiety, panic attacks, insomnia, anhedonia, concentration problems, memory impairment and suicidal ideation. A meta-analysis found a significant association between finasteride use and post-discontinuation depression, suicidal ideation, and sexual dysfunction, but the quality of evidence was limited.

The status of PFS as a legitimate and distinct medical pathology remains a subject of debate. A 2019 editorial in The BMJ called post-finasteride syndrome "ill defined and controversial". Some have argued that it has common features with other self-diagnosed "mystery syndromes" such as Morgellons or multiple chemical sensitivity, while others, including some in the biomedical research community, have concluded based on the available evidence that it represents a real and serious condition. There is no known underlying biological mechanism for the proposed syndrome, and its incidence is unclear. A lack of clear diagnostic criteria and the variable reporting fraction in different healthcare settings make the problem challenging to evaluate.

In 2016 Merck was a defendant in approximately 1,370 product liability lawsuits which had been filed by customers alleging they had experienced persistent sexual side-effects following cessation of treatment with finasteride. Most cases had been settled by 2018, when Merck paid a lump sum of US$4.3 million to be distributed. As of September 2019, 25 cases remained outstanding in the United States. In 2019, Reuters reported that faulty redactions in court documents revealed allegations from plaintiffs that Merck had known of persistent side effects in their original clinical trials but chose not to disclose them in warning labels.

== Overdose ==
Finasteride has been studied in humans at single doses of up to 400 mg and at continuous dosages of up to 80 mg/day for three months, without adverse effects observed. There is no specific recommended antidote for finasteride overdose.

== Interactions ==
No significant drug interactions have been observed between finasteride and a limited selection of medications.

== Pharmacology ==
=== Pharmacodynamics ===
Finasteride is a 5α-reductase inhibitor. It is specifically a selective inhibitor of the type II and III isoforms of the enzyme. By inhibiting these two isozymes of 5α-reductase, finasteride reduces the formation of the potent androgen dihydrotestosterone (DHT) from its precursor testosterone in certain tissues in the body such as the prostate gland, skin, and hair follicles. As such, finasteride is a type of antiandrogen, or more specifically, an androgen synthesis inhibitor. However, some authors do not define finasteride as an "antiandrogen," a term which can refer more specifically to antagonists of the androgen receptor.

Finasteride results in a decrease of circulating DHT levels by about 65–70% with an oral dosage of 5 mg/day and of DHT levels in the prostate gland by up to 80–90% with an oral dosage of 1 or 5 mg/day. In parallel, circulating levels of testosterone increase by approximately 10%, while local concentrations of testosterone in the prostate gland increase by about 7-fold and local testosterone levels in hair follicles increase by around 27–53%. An oral dosage of finasteride of only 0.2 mg/day has been found to achieve near-maximal suppression of DHT levels (68.6% for 0.2 mg/day relative to 72.2% for 5 mg/day). Finasteride does not completely suppress DHT production because it lacks significant inhibitory effects on the 5α-reductase type I isoenzyme, with more than 100-fold less inhibitory potency for type I as compared to type II (IC_{50} = 313 nM and 11 nM, respectively). This is in contrast to inhibitors of all three isoenzymes of 5α-reductase like dutasteride, which can reduce DHT levels in the entire body by more than 99%. In addition to inhibiting 5α-reductase, finasteride has also been found to competitively inhibit 5β-reductase (AKR1D1). However, its affinity for the enzyme is substantially less than for 5α-reductase (an order of magnitude less than for 5α-reductase type I) and hence is unlikely to be of clinical significance.

As of 2012, the tissues in which the different isozymes of 5α-reductase are expressed are not fully clear. This is because different investigators have obtained varying results with different reagents, methods, and tissues examined. However, the different isozymes of 5α-reductase appear to be widely expressed, with notable tissues including the prostate gland, seminal vesicles, testes, epididymides, skin, hair follicles, liver, kidneys, and brain, among others.

By inhibiting 5α-reductase and thus preventing DHT production, finasteride reduces androgen signaling in tissues like the prostate gland and the scalp. In the prostate, this reduces prostate volume, which improves BPH and reduces the risk of prostate cancer. Finasteride reduces prostate volume by 20 to 30% in men with benign prostatic hyperplasia. Inhibition of 5α-reductase also reduces epididymal weight, and decreases motility and normal morphology of spermatozoa in the epididymis.

Neurosteroids like 3α-androstanediol (derived from DHT) and allopregnanolone (derived from progesterone) activate the GABA_{A} receptor in the brain; because finasteride prevents the formation of neurosteroids, it functions as a neurosteroidogenesis inhibitor and may contribute to a reduction of GABA_{A} activity. Reduction of GABA_{A} receptor activation by these neurosteroids has been implicated in depression, anxiety, and sexual dysfunction.

In accordance with finasteride being a potent 5α-reductase inhibitor but a weak inhibitor of 5β-reductase, the medication decreases circulating levels of 5α-reduced steroids like allopregnanolone but does not reduce concentrations of 5β-reduced steroids like pregnanolone. Pregnanolone acts as a potent GABA_{A} receptor positive allosteric modulator similarly to allopregnanolone.

=== Pharmacokinetics ===
The mean oral bioavailability of finasteride is approximately 65%. The absorption of finasteride is not affected by food. At steady-state with 1 mg/day finasteride, mean peak concentrations of finasteride were 9.2 ng/mL (25 nmol/L). Conversely, following a single 5 mg dose of finasteride, mean peak levels of finasteride were 37 ng/mL (99 nmol/L), and plasma concentrations increased by 47–54% following 2.5 weeks of continued daily administration. The volume of distribution of finasteride is 76 L. Its plasma protein binding is 90%. The drug has been found to cross the blood–brain barrier, whereas levels in semen were found to be undetectable.

Finasteride is extensively metabolized in the liver, first by hydroxylation via CYP3A4 and then by aldehyde dehydrogenase. It has two major metabolites, which are the tert-butyl side chain monohydroxylated and monocarboxylic acid metabolites. These metabolites show approximately 20% of the inhibitory activity of finasteride on 5α-reductase. Hence, the metabolites of finasteride are not particularly active. The drug has a terminal half-life of 5 to 6 hours in adult men (18–60 years of age) and a terminal half-life of 8 hours or more in elderly men (more than 70 years of age). It is eliminated as its metabolites 57% in the feces and 40% in the urine.

== Chemistry ==
Finasteride, also known as 17β-(N-tert-butylcarbamoyl)-4-aza-5α-androst-1-en-3-one, is a synthetic androstane steroid and 4-azasteroid. It is an analogue of androgen steroid hormones like testosterone and DHT. As an unconjugated steroid, finasteride is a highly lipophilic compound.

=== Synthesis ===
The chemical synthesis of finasteride was reported:

A haloform reaction on progesterone [57-83-0] oxidizes the 17-acetyl group into a carboxylic acid to give etienic acid [302-97-6] (2). A Schotten–Baumann reaction with tert-butylamine gives N-t-Butyl-3-oxo-4-androstene-17beta-carboxamide [131267-80-6] (3). A Lemieux–Johnson oxidation opens ring A with loss of one carbon atom. The reaction arguably involves hydroxylation of the 4–5 double bond by permanganate followed by scission of the diol by periodate. The product of the step is [190006-01-0] (4). Addition of ammonia gives a lactam-enamine [166896-74-8] (5). Catalytic hydrogenation occurs from the alpha-face [98319-24-5] (6). The reaction of the lactam with BSTFA gives an silylated imidate. Oxidation of the C1C2 position with DDQ then introduces the enone olefin group, completing the synthesis of finasteride (7).

== History ==
In 1942, James Hamilton observed that prepubertal castration prevents the later development of male pattern baldness in mature men. In 1974, Julianne Imperato-McGinley of Cornell Medical College in New York attended a conference on birth defects. She reported on a group of intersex children in the Caribbean who appeared sexually ambiguous at birth, and were initially raised as girls, but then grew external male genitalia and other masculine characteristic after onset of puberty. These children, despite being raised as girls until puberty, were generally heterosexual and were termed "Guevedoces" by their local community, which means "penis at twelve" in Spanish. Her research group found these children shared a genetic mutation, causing deficiency of the 5α-reductase enzyme and male hormone dihydrotestosterone (DHT), which was found to have been the etiology behind abnormalities in male sexual development. Upon maturation, these individuals were observed to have smaller prostates which were underdeveloped, and were also observed to lack incidence of male pattern baldness.

In 1975, copies of Imperato-McGinley's presentation were seen by P. Roy Vagelos, who was then serving as Merck's basic research chief. He was intrigued by the notion that decreased levels of DHT led to the development of smaller prostates. Dr. Vagelos then sought to create a drug that could mimic the condition found in these children to treat older men who had benign prostatic hyperplasia.

Finasteride was developed by Merck under the code name MK-906. A team led by chemist Gary Rasmusson and biologist Jerry Brooks developed potential 5α-reductase inhibitors based on transition-state inhibitors, using an iterative process of molecular design, testing, and redesign. In 1992, finasteride (5 mg) was approved by the US Food and Drug Administration (FDA) for treatment of BPH, which Merck marketed under the brand name Proscar. Rasmusson and Brooks were awarded IPO's "Inventor of the Year" award in 1993 for their work on finasteride. In 1997, Merck was successful in obtaining FDA approval for a second indication of finasteride (1 mg) for treatment of male pattern hair loss, which was marketed under the brand name Propecia. It was the first 5α-reductase inhibitor to be introduced and was followed by dutasteride in 2001. The first study of finasteride in the treatment of hirsutism in women was published in 1994.

== Society and culture ==
=== Generic names ===
Finasteride is the generic name of the drug and its INN, USAN, BAN, and JAN, while finastéride is its DCF. It is also known by its former developmental code names MK-906, YM-152, and L-652,931.

=== Brand names ===
Finasteride is marketed primarily under the brand names Propecia, for pattern hair loss, and Proscar, for BPH, both of which are products of Merck & Co. There is 1 mg of finasteride in Propecia and 5 mg in Proscar. Merck's patent on finasteride for the treatment of BPH expired in June 2006. Merck was awarded a separate patent for the use of finasteride to treat pattern hair loss and it expired in November 2013. Finasteride is also marketed under a variety of other brand names throughout the world.

=== Athletics ===
From 2005 to 2009, the World Anti-Doping Agency banned finasteride because it was discovered that the drug could be used to mask steroid abuse. It was removed from the list effective 1 January 2009, after improvements in testing methods made the ban unnecessary. Athletes who used finasteride and were banned from international competition include skeleton racer Zach Lund, bobsledder Sebastien Gattuso, footballer Romário, and ice hockey goaltender José Théodore.

=== Miscellaneous ===
The US Food and Drug Administration (FDA) advises that donation of blood or plasma be deferred for at least one month after taking the last dose of finasteride. The UK also has a one-month deferral period.

== Research ==
Preliminary research suggests that topical finasteride may be effective in the treatment of pattern hair loss. Topical finasteride, like the oral preparation, reduces serum DHT.

DHT may be involved in the cause of acne, and 5α-reductase inhibitors might be effective in the treatment of the condition. A small retrospective study reported that finasteride was effective in the treatment of acne in women with normal testosterone levels. A randomized controlled trial found that finasteride was less effective than flutamide or an ethinylestradiol/cyproterone acetate birth control pill in the treatment of acne in women with high androgen levels.

Androgens and estrogens may be involved in the cause of hidradenitis suppurativa (acne inversa). Two case series have reported that finasteride is effective in the treatment of hidradenitis suppurativa in girls and women.

Finasteride and other antiandrogens might be useful in the treatment of obsessive–compulsive disorder (OCD), but more research is needed.
