= 5α-Reductase inhibitor =

Class of medications

- Drug class
- Dutasteride, one of the most widely used 5α-reductase inhibitors.

Class identifiers
- Synonyms: Dihydrotestosterone blockers; DHT blockers
- Use: Benign prostatic hyperplasia, pattern hair loss, hirsutism, feminizing HRT
- ATC code: G04CB
- Biological target: 5α-Reductase (1, 2, 3)
- Chemical class: Steroids; Azasteroids

Legal status

5α-Reductase inhibitors (5-ARIs), also known as dihydrotestosterone (DHT) blockers, are a class of medications with antiandrogenic effects which are used primarily in the treatment of enlarged prostate and scalp hair loss. They are also sometimes used to treat excess hair growth in women and as a component of hormone therapy for transgender women.

These agents inhibit the enzyme 5α-reductase, which is involved in the metabolic transformations of a variety of endogenous steroids. 5-ARIs are most known for preventing conversion of testosterone, the major androgen sex hormone, to the more potent androgen dihydrotestosterone (DHT), in certain androgen-associated disorders.

== Medical uses ==
5-ARIs are clinically used in the treatment of conditions that are exacerbated by DHT:

- Mild-to-moderate benign prostatic hyperplasia and lower urinary tract symptoms
- Pattern hair loss in both men and women

5-ARIs can be used in the treatment of hirsutism in women. The usefulness of 5-ARIs for the potential treatment of acne is uncertain. 5-ARIs are sometimes used as antiandrogens in feminizing hormone therapy for transgender women to help reduce body hair growth and scalp hair loss.

They have also been explored in the treatment and prevention of prostate cancer. While the 5-ARI finasteride reduces the cancer risk by about a third, it also increases the fraction of aggressive forms of prostate cancer. Overall, there does not seem to be a survival benefit for prostate cancer patients under finasteride.

=== Available forms ===
Finasteride (brand names Proscar, Propecia) inhibits the function of two of the isoenzymes (types 2 and 3) of 5α-reductase. It decreases circulating DHT levels by up to about 70%. Dutasteride (brand name Avodart) inhibits all three 5α-reductase isoenzymes and can decrease DHT levels by 95%. It can also reduce DHT levels in the prostate by 97 to 99% in men with prostate cancer. Epristeride (brand names Aipuliete, Chuanliu) is marketed in China for the treatment of benign prostatic hyperplasia. However, it can only decrease circulating DHT levels by about 25 to 54%. Alfatradiol (brand names Ell-Cranell Alpha, Pantostin) is a topical 5-ARI used to treat pattern hair loss in Europe.

5α-Reductase inhibitors marketed for clinical or veterinary use
| Generic name | Brand name(s) | Isoforms | Route(s) | Launch |
|---|---|---|---|---|
| Alfatradiol | Ell-Cranell Alpha, Pantostin | ? | Topical | ? |
| Dutasteride | Avodart | 1, 2, 3 | Oral | 2001 |
| Epristeride | Aipuliete, Chuanliu | 2, 3 | Oral | 2000 |
| Finasteride | Proscar, Propecia | 2, 3 | Oral | 1992 |

== Side effects ==
5-ARIs are generally well tolerated in both men and women and produce few side effects. However, they have been found to have some risks in studies with men, including slightly increased risks of decreased libido, erectile dysfunction, ejaculatory dysfunction, infertility, breast tenderness, gynecomastia, depression, anxiety, self-harm, and dementia. In addition, although 5-ARIs decrease the overall risk of developing prostate cancer, they have been found to increase the risk of developing certain rare but high-grade forms of prostate cancer. As a result, the FDA has notified healthcare professionals that the Warnings and Precautions section of the labels for the 5-ARI class of drugs has been revised to include new safety information about the increased risk of being diagnosed with these rare but more serious forms of prostate cancer. Finasteride has also been associated with intraoperative floppy iris syndrome and cataract formation. Depressive symptoms and suicidality have been reported.

=== Sexual dysfunction ===
Sexual dysfunction, including erectile dysfunction, loss of libido, and reduced ejaculate, may occur in 3.4 to 15.8% of men treated with finasteride or dutasteride. This is linked to lower quality of life and can cause stress in relationships. There is also an association with lowered sexual desire. It has been reported that in a subset of men, these adverse sexual side effects may persist even after discontinuation of finasteride or dutasteride.

=== Breast changes ===
5-ARIs have a small risk of breast changes in men including breast tenderness and gynecomastia (breast development/enlargement). The risk of gynecomastia is about 1.3%. There is no association of 5-ARIs with male breast cancer.

=== Emotional changes ===
A 2017 population-based, matched-cohort study of 93,197 men aged 66 years and older with BPH found that finasteride and dutasteride were associated with a significantly increased risk of depression (HR, 1.94; 95% CI, 1.73–2.16) and self-harm (HR, 1.88; 95% CI, 1.34–2.64) during the first 18 months of treatment, but were not associated with an increased risk of suicide (HR, 0.88; 95% CI, 0.53–1.45). After the initial 18 months of therapy, the risk of self-harm was no longer heightened, whereas the elevation in risk of depression lessened but remained marginally increased (HR, 1.22; 95% CI, 1.08–1.37). The absolute increase in the rate of depression was 247 per 100,000 patient-years and of self-harm was 17 per 100,000 patient-years. As such, on the basis of these findings, it has been stated that cases of depression in patients that are attributable to 5-ARIs will be encountered on occasion, while cases of self-harm attributable to 5-ARIs will be encountered very rarely. There were no differences in the rates of depression, self-harm, and suicide between finasteride and dutasteride, suggesting that the specific 5-ARI used does not influence the risks. The absolute risks of self-harm and depression with 5-ARIs remain low (0.14% and 2.0%, respectively).

== Pharmacology ==
The pharmacology of 5α-reductase inhibition is complex, but involves the binding of NADPH to the enzyme followed by the substrate. Specific substrates include testosterone, progesterone, androstenedione, epitestosterone, cortisol, aldosterone, and deoxycorticosterone. The entire physiologic effect of their reduction is unknown, but likely related to their excretion or is itself physiologic. 5α-Reductase reduces the steroid Δ^{4,5} double bond in testosterone to its more active form DHT. Thus, inhibition results in decreased amounts of DHT. Because of this, slight elevations in testosterone and estradiol levels occur. The 5α-reductase reaction is a rate-limiting step in the testosterone reduction and involves the binding of NADPH to the enzyme followed by the substrate.

Substrate + NADPH + H^{+} → 5α-substrate + NADP^{+}

Beyond being a catalyst in the rate-limiting step in testosterone reduction, 5α-reductase isoforms I and II reduce progesterone to 5α-dihydroprogesterone (5α-DHP) and deoxycorticosterone to dihydrodeoxycorticosterone (DHDOC). In vitro and animal models suggest subsequent 3α-reduction of DHT, 5α-DHP and DHDOC lead to neurosteroid metabolites with effect on cerebral function. These neurosteroids, which include allopregnanolone, tetrahydrodeoxycorticosterone (THDOC), and 3α-androstanediol, act as potent positive allosteric modulators of GABA_{A} receptors, and have antidepressant, anxiolytic, prosexual, and anticonvulsant effects. 5α-Dihydrocortisol is present in the aqueous humor of the eye, is synthesized in the lens, and might help make the aqueous humor itself. 5α-Dihydroaldosterone is a potent antinatriuretic agent, although different from aldosterone. Its formation in the kidney is enhanced by restriction of dietary salt, suggesting it may help retain sodium. 5α-DHP is a major hormone in circulation of normal cycling and pregnant women.

Other enzymes compensate to a degree for the absent conversion of 5α-reductase, specifically with local expression at the skin of reductive 17β-hydroxysteroid dehydrogenase, and oxidative 3α-hydroxysteroid dehydrogenase and 3β-hydroxysteroid dehydrogenase enzymes.

In BPH, DHT acts as a potent cellular androgen and promotes prostate growth; therefore, DHT blockers inhibit and alleviate symptoms of BPH. In alopecia, male and female-pattern baldness is an effect of androgenic receptor activation, so reducing levels of DHT also reduces hair loss.

== History ==
Finasteride was the first 5-ARI to be introduced for medical use. It was marketed for the treatment of BPH in 1992 and was subsequently approved for the treatment of pattern hair loss in 1997. Epristeride was the second 5-ARI to be introduced and was marketed for the treatment of BPH in China in 2000. Dutasteride was approved for the treatment of BPH in 2001 and was subsequently approved for pattern hair loss in South Korea in 2009 and in Japan in 2015. The patent protection on finasteride and dutasteride has expired and both drugs are available as generic medications.

== Research ==
5-ARIs have been studied in combination with the nonsteroidal antiandrogen bicalutamide for the treatment of prostate cancer.

== See also ==
- List of 5α-reductase inhibitors
- Discovery and development of 5α-reductase inhibitors
- CYP17A1 inhibitor
- Neurosteroidogenesis inhibitor
