= Hydrocortisone =

Glucocorticoid and mineralocorticoid hormone Cortisol supplied as a medication

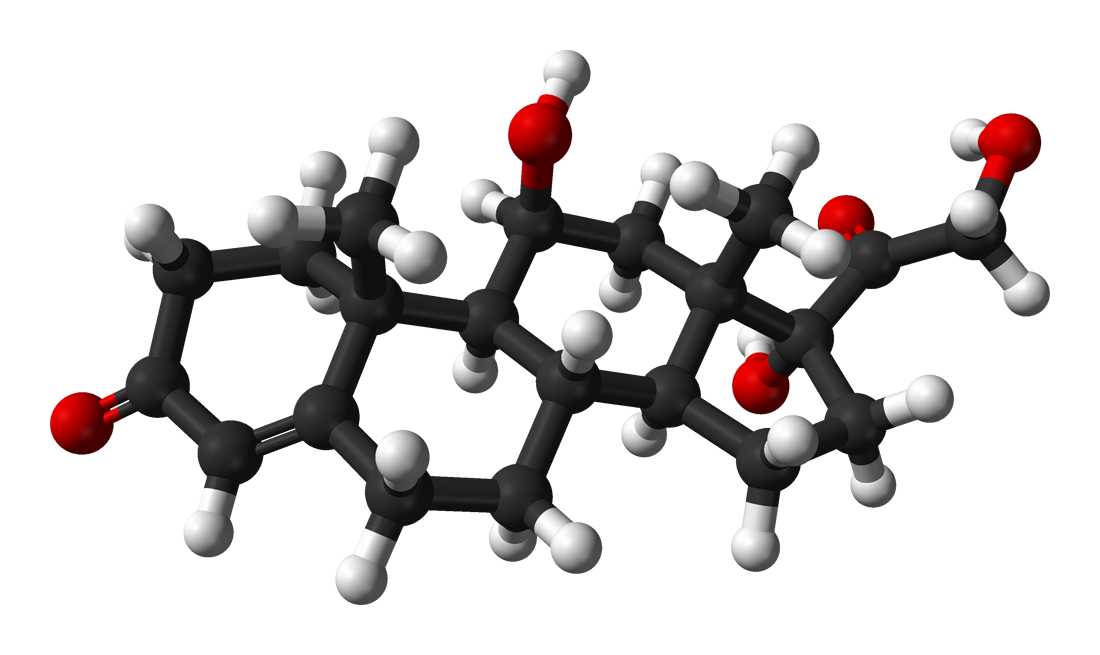

Clinical data
- Trade names: Cortef, others
- Other names: Cortisol; 11β,17α,21-Trihydroxypregn-4-ene-3,20-dione; 11β,17α,21-Trihydroxyprogesterone
- AHFS/Drugs.com: Monograph
- MedlinePlus: a682206
- License data: US DailyMed: Hydrocortisone
- Pregnancy category: AU: A
- Routes of administration: By mouth, intravenous, topical, rectal
- Drug class: Glucocorticoid; Mineralocorticoid
- ATC code: A01AC03 (WHO) A07EA02 (WHO), C05AA01 (WHO), D07AA02 (WHO), D07XA01 (WHO), H02AB09 (WHO), S01BA02 (WHO), S01CB03 (WHO), S02BA01 (WHO)

Legal status
- Legal status: AU: S4 (Prescription only) / S3 / S2; NZ: Pharmacist only; UK: POM (Prescription only) / P / GSL; US: OTC / Rx-only; EU: OTC / Rx-only

Pharmacokinetic data
- Bioavailability: Oral: 96 ± 20%
- Protein binding: 92 ± 2% (92–93%)
- Metabolism: 11β-HSDs, others
- Metabolites: Cortisone, others
- Onset of action: Oral: 1.2 ± 0.4 hours (T_{max})
- Elimination half-life: 1.2–2.0 hours
- Duration of action: 8–12 hours
- Excretion: Urine: >90% (<1% unchanged)

Identifiers
- IUPAC name: (8S,9S,10R,11S,13S,14S,17R)-11,17-Dihydroxy-17-(2-hydroxyacetyl)-10,13-dimethyl-2,6,7,8,9,11,12,14,15,16-decahydro-1H-cyclopenta[a]phenanthren-3-one
- CAS Number: 50-23-7
- PubChem CID: 5754
- DrugBank: DB00741
- ChemSpider: 5551
- UNII: WI4X0X7BPJ
- KEGG: D00088; D00165
- ChEBI: CHEBI:17650
- ChEMBL: ChEMBL389621

Chemical and physical data
- Formula: C_{21}H_{30}O_{5}
- Molar mass: 362.466 g·mol^{−1}
- 3D model (JSmol): Interactive image
- SMILES: O=C4\C=C2/[C@]([C@H]1[C@@H](O)C[C@@]3([C@@](O)(C(=O)CO)CC[C@H]3[C@@H]1CC2)C)(C)CC4
- InChI: InChI=1S/C21H30O5/c1-19-7-5-13(23)9-12(19)3-4-14-15-6-8-21(26,17(25)11-22)20(15,2)10-16(24)18(14)19/h9,14-16,18,22,24,26H,3-8,10-11H2,1-2H3/t14-,15-,16-,18+,19-,20-,21-/m0/s1; Key:JYGXADMDTFJGBT-VWUMJDOOSA-N

Hydrocortisone is the name for the hormone cortisol when supplied as a medication. It is a corticosteroid and works as an anti-inflammatory and by immune suppression. Uses include conditions such as adrenocortical insufficiency, adrenogenital syndrome, high blood calcium, thyroiditis, rheumatoid arthritis, dermatitis, asthma, and COPD. It is the treatment of choice for adrenocortical insufficiency. It can be given by mouth, topically, rectally or by injection. Stopping treatment after long-term use should be done slowly.

Common side effects may include mood changes, increased appetite, hyperglycemia, hypertension, and edema (swelling). With long-term use, common side effects include osteoporosis, adrenal insufficiency, upset stomach, physical weakness, easy bruising, and candidiasis (yeast infections). It is unclear if it is safe for use during pregnancy.

Hydrocortisone was patented in 1936 and approved for medical use in 1941. It is on the World Health Organization's List of Essential Medicines. It is available as a generic medication. In 2023, it was the 182nd most commonly prescribed medication in the United States, with more than 2 million prescriptions.

== Medical uses ==
Hydrocortisone is the pharmaceutical term for cortisol used in oral administration, intravenous injection, or topical application. It is used as an immunosuppressive drug, given by injection in the treatment of severe allergic reactions such as anaphylaxis and angioedema, in place of prednisolone in patients needing steroid treatment but unable to take oral medication, and perioperatively in patients on long-term steroid treatment to prevent an adrenal crisis. It may also be injected into inflamed joints resulting from diseases such as gout.

It may be used topically for allergic rashes, eczema, psoriasis, itching, and other inflammatory skin conditions. Topical hydrocortisone creams and ointments are available in most countries without prescription in strengths ranging from 0.05% to 2.5% (depending on local regulations) with stronger forms available by prescription only.

It may also be used rectally in suppositories to relieve the swelling, itch, and irritation in hemorrhoids.

It may be used as an acetate form (hydrocortisone acetate), which has slightly different pharmacokinetics and pharmacodynamics.

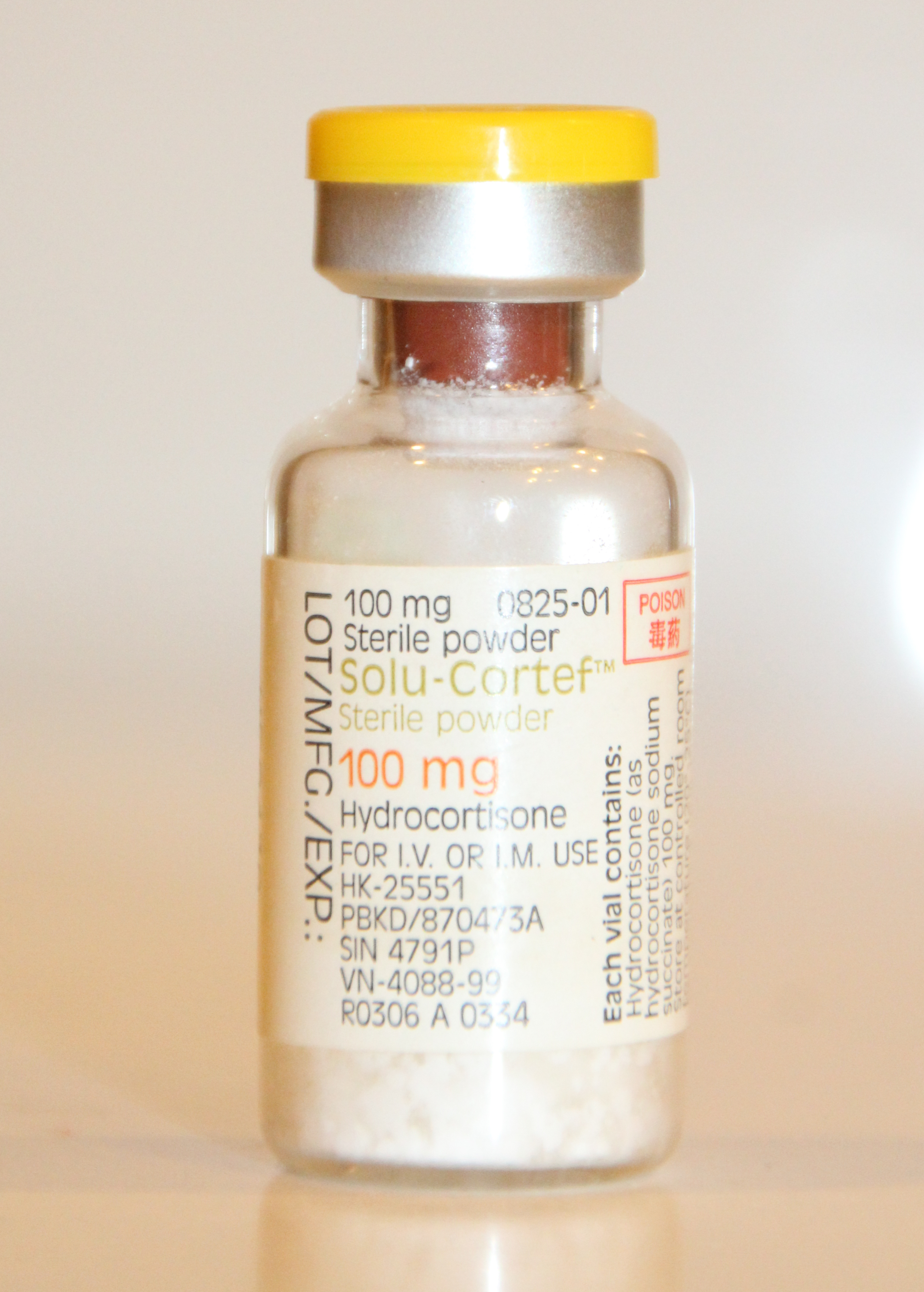
Cortisol for injection

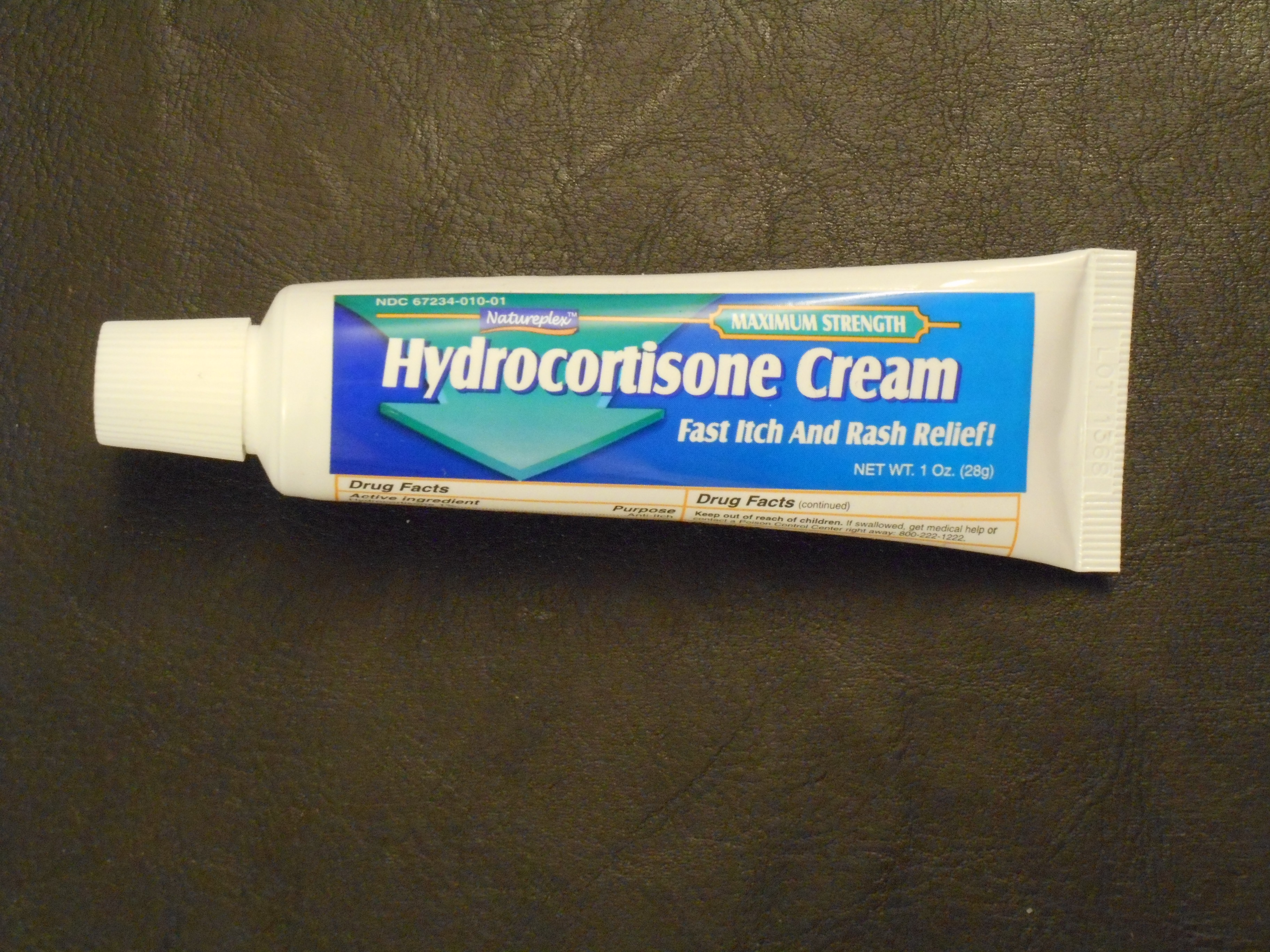
A tube of hydrocortisone cream, purchased over-the-counter

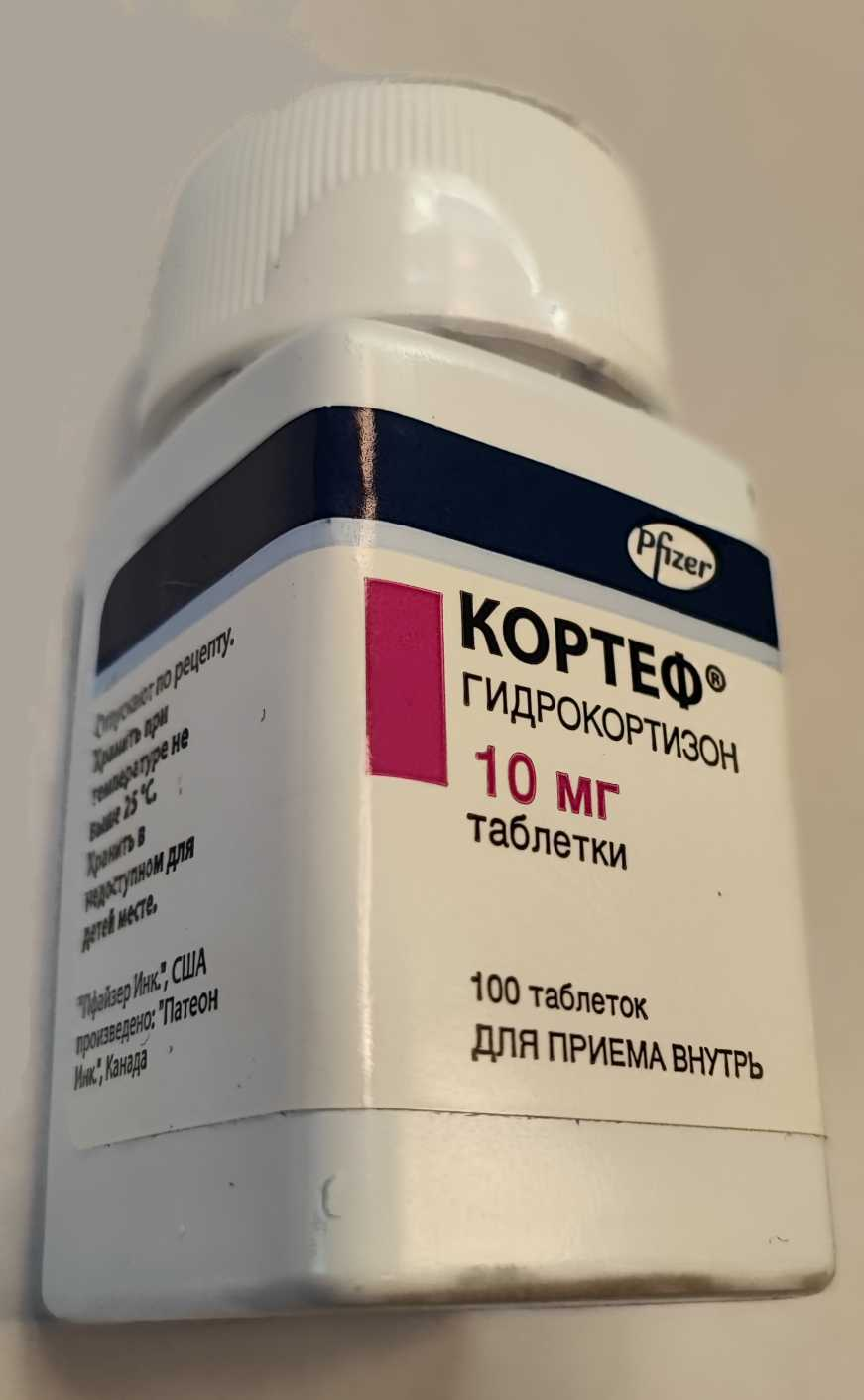
Hydrocortisone 10 mg oral tablets (depicted a package for Russian market)

== Side effects ==
Side effects of hydrocortisone include hypertension, salt and water retention, hypokalemia, adrenal suppression, immunosuppression, increased risk of infections and infectious reactivation, Cushingoid symptoms, and neuropsychiatric symptoms such as depression, among many others. The side effects of hydrocortisone are dose-dependent, with many of them occurring only at higher doses.

Hydrocortisone has been found to suppress rapid eye movement sleep (REM sleep) and to enhance slow wave sleep (SWS). In addition, it has been found to increase nighttime awakenings and time spent awake. The effects of hydrocortisone on sleep may be dose-dependent and different or even opposite at low versus high doses. It is thought that the glucocorticoid activity of hydrocortisone is responsible for REM sleep suppression, while its mineralocorticoid activity mediates its SWS enhancement.

== Pharmacology ==
=== Pharmacodynamics ===
Hydrocortisone is a corticosteroid, acting specifically as both a glucocorticoid and as a mineralocorticoid. That is, it is an agonist of the glucocorticoid and mineralocorticoid receptors.

Hydrocortisone has low potency relative to synthetic corticosteroids. Compared to hydrocortisone, prednisolone is about 4 times as potent and dexamethasone about 40 times as potent in terms of anti-inflammatory effect. Prednisolone can also be used as cortisol replacement, and at replacement dose levels (rather than anti-inflammatory levels), prednisolone is about 8 times more potent than cortisol. The equivalent doses and relative potencies of hydrocortisone compared to various other synthetic corticosteroids have also been reviewed and summarized.

The endogenous production rate of cortisol is approximately 5.7 to 9.9 mg/m^{2} per day, which corresponds to an oral hydrocortisone dose of approximately 15 to 20 mg/day (for a 70-kg person). One review described daily cortisol production of 10 mg in healthy volunteers and reported that daily cortisol production could increase up to 400 mg in conditions of severe stress (e.g., surgery).

The total and/or free concentrations of cortisol/hydrocortisone required for various glucocorticoid effects have been determined.

In addition to its corticosteroid receptor agonism, hydrocortisone has been reported to be a highly potent biphasic regulator of the GABA_{A} receptor, acting as a positive allosteric modulator at low concentrations (1–10 pM) and as a negative allosteric modulator at high concentrations (10–1,000 nM).

=== Pharmacokinetics ===
==== Absorption ====
The bioavailability of oral hydrocortisone is about 96% ± 20% (SD). The pharmacokinetics of hydrocortisone are non-linear. The peak level of oral hydrocortisone is 15.3 ± 2.9 (SD) μg/L per 1 mg dose. The time to peak concentrations of oral hydrocortisone is 1.2 ± 0.4 (SD) hours.

The topical percutaneous absorption of hydrocortisone varies widely depending on experimental circumstances and has been reported to range from 0.5 to 14.9% in different studies. Some skin application sites, like the scrotum and vulva, absorb hydrocortisone much more efficiently than other application sites, like the forearm. In one study, the amount of hydrocortisone absorbed ranged from 0.2% to 36.2% depending on the application site, with the ball of the foot having the lowest absorption and the scrotum having the highest absorption. The absorption of hydrocortisone by the vulva has ranged from 4.4 to 8.1%, relative to 1.3 to 2.8% for the arm, in different studies and subjects.

==== Distribution ====
Most cortisol in the blood (all but about 4%) is bound to proteins, including corticosteroid binding globulin (CBG) and serum albumin. A pharmacokinetic review stated that 92% ± 2% (SD) (92–93%) of hydrocortisone is plasma protein-bound. Free cortisol passes easily through cellular membranes. Inside cells it interacts with corticosteroid receptors.

==== Metabolism ====
Hydrocortisone is metabolized by 11β-hydroxysteroid dehydrogenases (11β-HSDs) into cortisone, an inactive metabolite. It is additionally 5α-, 5β-, and 3α-reduced into dihydrocortisols, dihydrocortisones, tetrahydrocortisols, and tetrahydrocortisones.

==== Elimination ====
Hydrocortisone and its metabolites are more than 90% conjugated in the liver and excreted in urine. Only a very small proportion of hydrocortisone is excreted unchanged (<1%).

The elimination half-life of hydrocortisone ranges from about 1.2 to 2.0 hours, with an average of around 1.5 hours, regardless of oral versus parenteral administration. The duration of action of systemic hydrocortisone has been listed as 8 to 12 hours.

== Chemistry ==
Hydrocortisone, also known as 11β,17α,21-trihydroxypregn-4-ene-3,20-dione, is a naturally occurring pregnane steroid. A variety of hydrocortisone esters exist and have been marketed for medical use.

== History ==
Hydrocortisone was discovered in the 1930s. It was introduced as a prescription medication in the United States in 1952. In 1979, topical hydrocortisone became available as a non-prescription over-the-counter drug in the United States.

== Society and culture ==
=== Legal status ===
In March 2021, the Committee for Medicinal Products for Human Use (CHMP) of the European Medicines Agency (EMA) adopted a positive opinion, recommending the granting of a marketing authorization for the medicinal product Efmody, intended for the treatment of congenital adrenal hyperplasia (CAH) in people aged twelve years and older. The applicant for this medicinal product is Diurnal Europe BV. Hydrocortisone (Efmody) was approved for medical use in the European Union, in May 2021, for the treatment of congenital adrenal hyperplasia (CAH) in people aged twelve years and older.

=== Anti-competitive practices ===
In the UK, the Competition and Markets Authority (CMA) concluded an investigation into the supply of hydrocortisone tablets, finding that from October 2008 onwards, drug suppliers Auden McKenzie and Actavis plc had charged "excessive and unfair prices" for 10mg and 20mg tablets and entered into agreements with potential competitors, paying companies who agreed not to enter the hydrocortisone market and enabling Auden McKenzie and Actavis to supply the drugs as "generic" rather than branded products and thereby escape price controls until eventually other companies entered the market. Auden and Actavis overcharged the UK's National Health Service for over ten years. Fines totalling over £255m were levied against the companies involved in this breach of competition law.

== Research ==
=== Depression ===
Cortisol is released in response to stress and both cortisol and stress have been extensively implicated in depression. People with depression show hypothalamic–pituitary–adrenal axis (HPA axis) hyperactivity, elevated cortisol levels, flattened diurnal cortisol rhythms, and reduced glucocorticoid sensitivity. Findings on the cortisol awakening response (CAR) in people with depression have been mixed, with some studies finding a greater CAR and others finding a blunted CAR, possibly related to different types of depression. Most research has focused on lowering cortisol levels or reducing cortisol signaling to treat depression, as the predominant paradigm has been that excess glucocorticoid signaling may contribute to depression. Relatedly, chronic administration of high doses of corticosteroids have been found to produce depression and other adverse effects. Antiglucocorticoids like corticotropin-releasing hormone antagonists, mifepristone, and metyrapone were extensively studied for treatment of depression, but were found to be ineffective and were abandoned, though some study on these agents persists.

Cortisol has an inverted U-shaped association with mood and other functions, with both hypercortisolemia (e.g., Cushing's syndrome) and hypocortisolemia (e.g., Addison's disease) associated with depression compared to more moderate levels. Relatedly, depression is thought to be a heterogeneous condition, and different subtypes of depression may have different levels of HPA axis and cortisol signaling. Although hypercortisolemia is most often implicated in depression, a subset of people with depression instead show hypocortisolemia. Atypical depression has been associated with lower cortisol levels, while melancholic and psychotic depression have been linked to higher cortisol levels.

Cortisol release in response to stress is most commonly perceived or assumed as mediating negative affect. However, in contrast to the case of chronic stress and cortisol elevation, numerous studies have shown that cortisol is instead related to mood-protective and anxiolytic effects during acute stress and actually functions as an adaptive and resilience-promoting hormone in this context. Along similar lines, short-term administration of high doses of corticosteroids is well-known to produce euphoria and mania. There are even rare case reports of corticosteroid misuse, addiction, and dependence. In relation to the preceding, acute or transient administration of hydrocortisone has been found to enhance mood and resilience and may provide beneficial effects in people with depression per various clinical studies. Similarly, restitution of daily cortisol rhythms with administration of low-dose hydrocortisone early in the day theoretically might also be helpful for some types of depression.

=== Post-traumatic stress disorder ===
Hydrocortisone has been assessed in the treatment of post-traumatic stress disorder (PTSD) in a variety of clinical studies. It is proposed to work by reducing retrieval of aversive memories and facilitating extinction of aversive memories. In addition to treatment of PTSD, hydrocortisone has been studied and found effective in reducing risk of developing PTSD when given in the aftermath of a traumatic event. It has been found to be the most effective intervention for prevention of PTSD, whereas a variety of other modalities were ineffective.

=== Phobias ===
Hydrocortisone has been studied in the treatment of phobias such as social phobia and specific phobias. It has been found to diminish fear in response to phobia-specific stimuli by reducing retrieval of aversive memories. In addition, the drug has been found to enhance extinction of phobias with exposure therapy.

=== Chronic fatigue syndrome ===
Cortisol levels have been found to be altered in people with myalgic encephalomyelitis/chronic fatigue syndrome (ME/CFS). Hypocortisolism may be involved in this condition and in related conditions like fibromyalgia. Hydrocortisone has been clinically studied in the treatment of ME/CFS. A 2016 systematic review found that it had been assessed for this purpose in six clinical studies. Its clinical effectiveness was conflicting in the studies, ranging from not effective, to slightly or mildly effective, to moderately effective. Four of the studies came from one research group. The systematic review called for higher-quality trials. A 2015 systematic review found that the clinical data on hydrocortisone for ME/CFS was inconclusive. A 2010 narrative review reported that hydrocortisone provided short-term reductions in fatigue and symptoms, but had limitations like temporary benefits, rapid loss of effectiveness upon discontinuation, only a minority of individuals benefiting, and there being no known treatment response predictors, concluding that hydrocortisone could not be recommended for treatment of ME/CFS.

=== COVID-19 ===
Hydrocortisone was found to be effective in reducing mortality rate of critically ill COVID-19 patients when compared to other usual care or a placebo.
