= C21H32O5 =

The molecular formula C_{21}H_{32}O_{5} may refer to:

- 5α-Dihydrocortisol, a metabolite of cortisol that is formed by 5α-reductase
- Tetrahydrocortisone, a steroid and an inactive metabolite of cortisone
