= C21H34O4 =

The molecular formula C_{21}H_{34}O_{4} (molar mass: 350.49 g/mol, exact mass: 350.2457 u) may refer to:

- Tetrahydrocorticosterone, or 3α,5α-Tetrahydrocorticosterone
- U46619
