= Polyprenol reductase =

Class of enzymes

Identifiers
- EC no.: 1.3.1.94

Databases
- IntEnz: IntEnz view
- BRENDA: BRENDA entry
- ExPASy: NiceZyme view
- KEGG: KEGG entry
- MetaCyc: metabolic pathway
- PRIAM: profile
- PDB structures: RCSB PDB PDBe PDBsum
Search
- PMC: articles
- PubMed: articles
- NCBI: proteins

Polyprenol reductase (EC 1.3.1.94, SRD5A3 (gene), DFG10 (gene)) is an enzyme with systematic name ditrans,polycis-dolichol:NADP^{+} 2,3-oxidoreductase. This enzyme catalyses the following chemical reaction

ditrans, polycis-dolichol + NADP^{+} $\rightleftharpoons$ ditrans, polycis-polyprenol + NADPH + H^{+}

The reaction occurs in the reverse direction.

== See also ==
- SRD5A3
- DFG10
