= 5α-Reductase =

Enzyme family

3-Oxo-5α-steroid 4-dehydrogenase
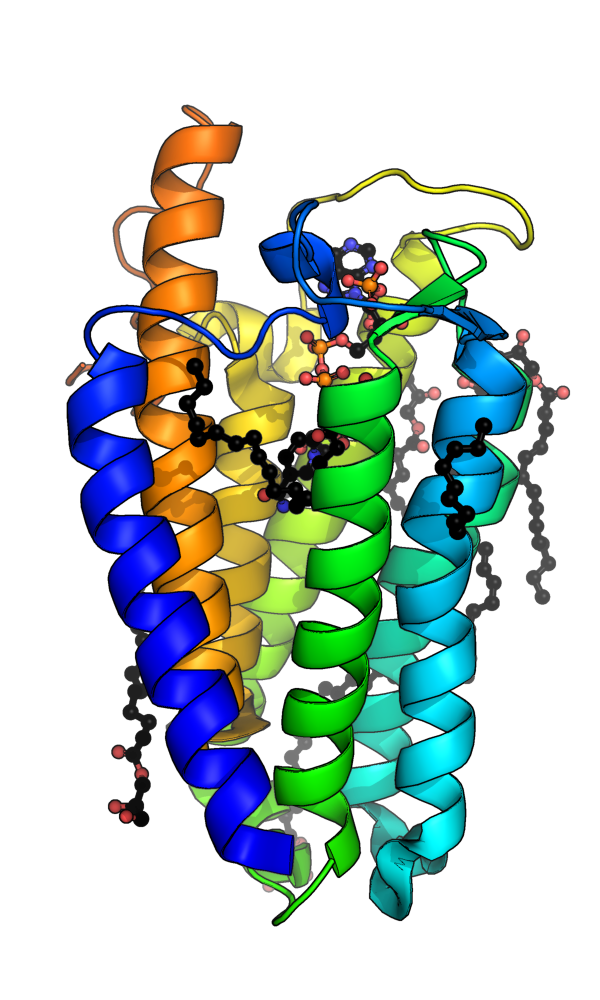
- Bacterial SDR5A in complex with NADPH and monoolein PDB: 7C83

Identifiers
- EC no.: 1.3.1.22
- CAS no.: 9036-43-5

Databases
- BRENDA: enzyme data
- ExPASy: NiceZyme view
- KEGG: enzyme entry
- MetaCyc: metabolic pathway
- Rhea: reactions
- PDB structures: RCSB PDB PDBe PDBsum
- Gene Ontology: AmiGO / QuickGO
Search
- PMC: articles
- PubMed: articles
- NCBI: proteins

Steroid-5α-reductase 1

Identifiers
- Symbol: SRD5A1
- NCBI gene: 6715
- HGNC: 11284
- OMIM: 184753
- RefSeq: NM_001047
- UniProt: P18405

Other data
- EC number: 1.3.1.22
- Locus: Chr. 5 p15
Search for
- Structures: Swiss-model
- Domains: InterPro

Steroid-5α-reductase 2
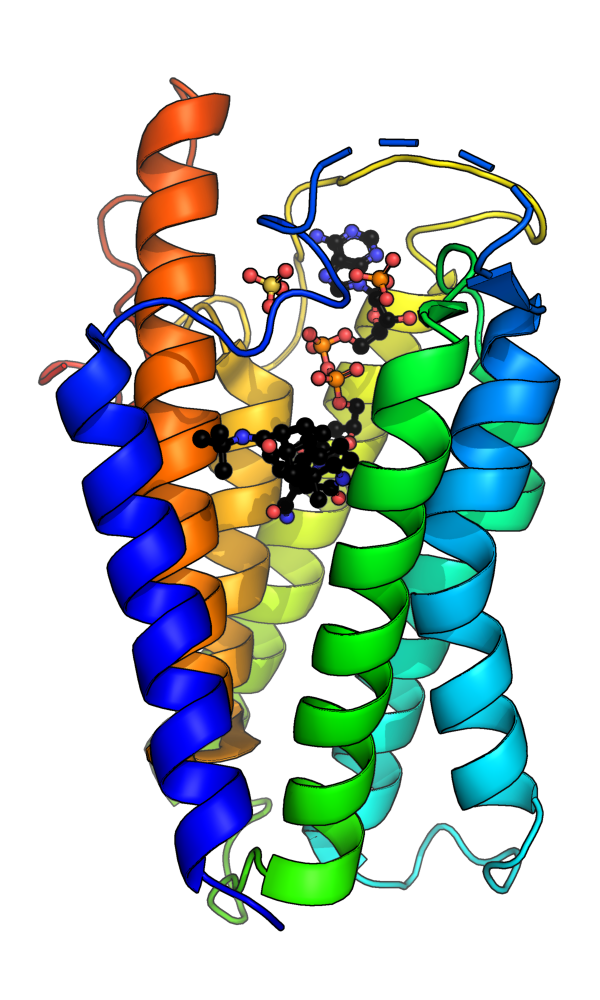
- Human SRD5A2 in complex with NADPH and Finasteride PDB: 7BW1

Identifiers
- Symbol: SRD5A2
- NCBI gene: 6716
- HGNC: 11285
- OMIM: 607306
- RefSeq: NM_000348
- UniProt: P31213

Other data
- EC number: 1.3.1.22
- Locus: Chr. 2 p23
Search for
- Structures: Swiss-model
- Domains: InterPro

Steroidogenesis, showing both actions of 5α-reductase at bottom center.

5α-Reductases, also known as 3-oxo-5α-steroid 4-dehydrogenases, are enzymes involved in steroid metabolism. They participate in three metabolic pathways: bile acid biosynthesis, androgen and estrogen metabolism. There are three isozymes of 5α-reductase encoded by the genes SRD5A1, SRD5A2, and SRD5A3.

5α-Reductases catalyze the following generalized chemical reaction:

a 3-oxo-5α-steroid + acceptor ⇌ a 3-oxo-Δ^{4}-steroid + reduced acceptor

Where a 3-oxo-5α-steroid and acceptor are substrates, and a corresponding 3-oxo-Δ4-steroid and the reduced acceptor are products. An instance of this generalized reaction that 5α-reductase type 2 catalyzes is:

testosterone
+ NADPH
H^{+}
H^{+}
dihydrotestosterone
+ NADP^{+}

where dihydrotestosterone is the 3-oxo-5α-steroid, NADP^{+} is the acceptor and testosterone is the 3-oxo-Δ4-steroid and NADPH the reduced acceptor.

== Production and activity ==
The enzyme is produced in many tissues in both males and females, in the reproductive tract, testes and ovaries, skin, seminal vesicles, prostate, epididymis and many organs, including the nervous system. There are three isoenzymes of 5α-reductase: steroid 5α-reductase 1, 2, and 3 (SRD5A1, SRD5A2 and SRD5A3).

5α-Reductases act on 3-oxo (3-keto), Δ^{4,5} C19/C21 steroids as its substrates; "3-keto" refers to the double bond of the third carbon to oxygen. Carbons 4 and 5 also have a double bond, represented by 'Δ^{4,5}'. The reaction involves a stereospecific and permanent break of the Δ^{4,5} with the help of NADPH as a cofactor. A hydride anion (H−) is also placed on the α face at the fifth carbon, and a proton on the β face at carbon 4.

== Distribution with age ==
5α-R1 is expressed in fetal scalp and nongenital skin of the back, anywhere from 5 to 50 times less than in the adult. 5α-R2 is expressed in fetal prostates similar to adults. 5α-R1 is expressed mainly in the epithelium and 5α-R2 the stroma of the fetal prostate. Scientists looked for 5α-R2 expression in fetal liver, adrenal, testis, ovary, brain, scalp, chest, and genital skin, using immunoblotting, and were only able to find it in genital skin.

After birth, the 5α-R1 is expressed in more locations, including the liver, skin, scalp and prostate. 5α-R2 is expressed in prostate, seminal vesicles, epididymis, liver, and to a lesser extent the scalp and skin. Hepatic expression of both 5α-R1 and 2 is immediate, but disappears in the skin and scalp at month 18. Then, at puberty, only 5α-R2 is reexpressed in the skin and scalp.

5α-R1 and 5α-R2 appear to be expressed in the prostate in male fetuses and throughout postnatal life. 5α-R1 and 5α-R2 are also expressed, although to different degrees in liver, genital and nongenital skin, prostate, epididymis, seminal vesicle, testis, ovary, uterus, kidney, exocrine pancreas, and the brain.

5α-R3 is ubiquitously expressed in most tissues but no apparent role in androgen processing or signaling. Instead, 5α-R3 functions in reduction of polyphenol substrates and N-linked glycosylation pathways.

== Substrates ==
Specific substrates include testosterone, progesterone, androstenedione, epitestosterone, cortisol, aldosterone, and deoxycorticosterone. Outside of dihydrotestosterone, much of the physiological role of 5α-reduced steroids is unknown. Beyond reducing testosterone to dihydrotestosterone, 5alpha-reductase enzyme isoforms I and II reduce progesterone to dihydroprogesterone (DHP) and deoxycorticosterone to dihydrodeoxycorticosterone (DHDOC). In vitro and animal models suggest subsequent 3alpha-reduction of DHT, DHP and DHDOC lead to steroid metabolites with effects on cerebral function achieved by enhancing GABAergic inhibition. These neuroactive steroid derivatives enhance GABA via allosteric modulation at GABA(A) receptors and have anticonvulsant, antidepressant and anxiolytic effects, and also alter sexual and alcohol related behavior. 5α-dihydrocortisol is present in the aqueous humor of the eye, is synthesized in the lens, and might help make the aqueous humor itself. Allopregnanolone and THDOC are neurosteroids, with the latter having effects on the susceptibility of animals to seizures. In socially isolated mice, 5α-R1 is specifically down-regulated in glutamatergic pyramidal neurons that converge on the amygdala from cortical and hippocampal regions. This down-regulation may account for the appearance of behavioral disorders such as anxiety, aggression, and cognitive dysfunction. 5α-dihydroaldosterone is a potent antinatriuretic agent, although different from aldosterone. Its formation in the kidney is enhanced by restriction of dietary salt, suggesting it may help retain sodium as follows:

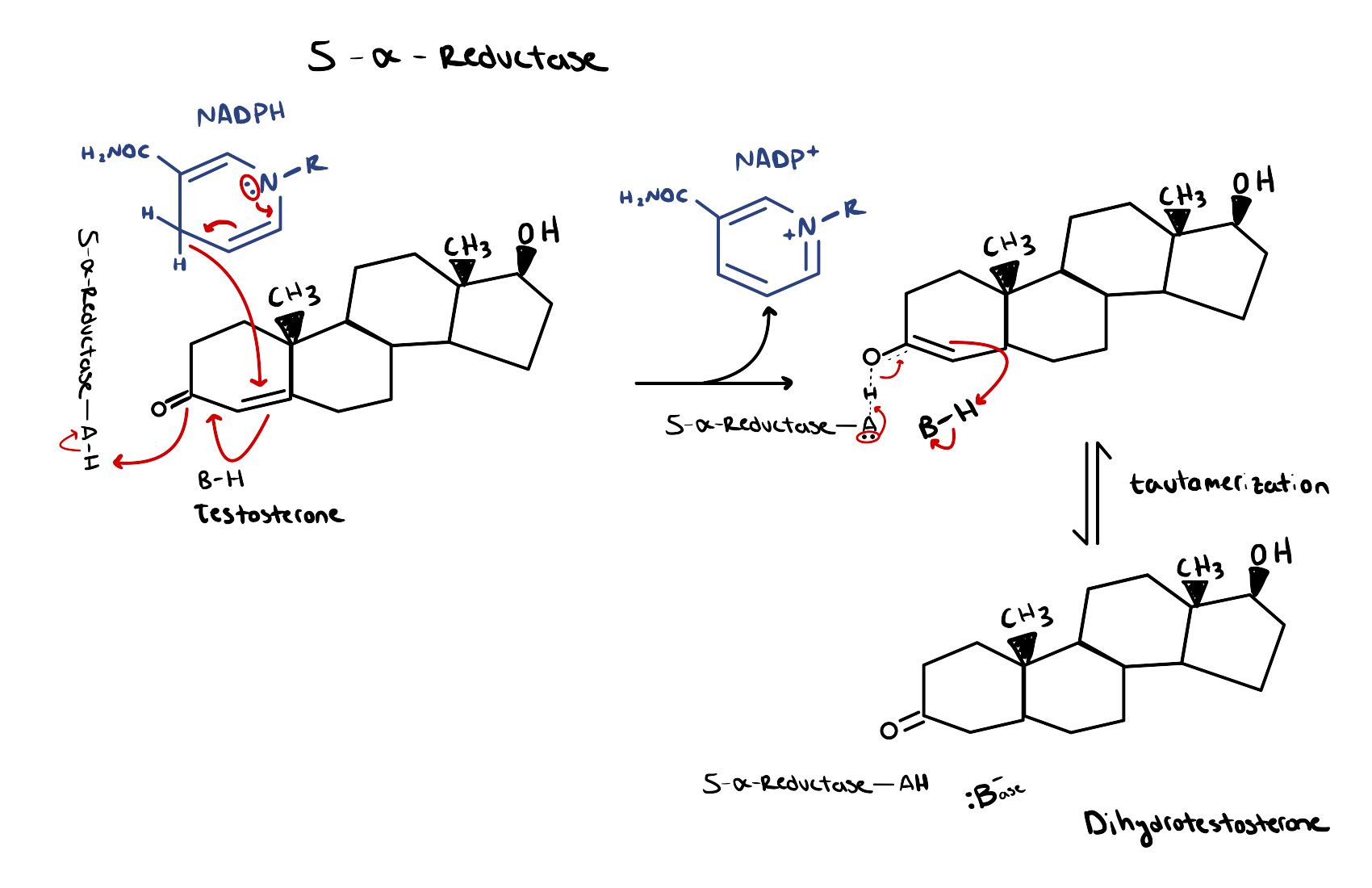
This is the mechanism of 5α-reductase on testosterone to convert it into DHT (dihydrotestosterone). 5α-Reductase works by using the reducing power of NADPH to perform a hydride shift on the double carbon bond in the ring causing enolate formation and subsequent tautamerization to form DHT.

$\ce{{Substrate} + {NADPH} + H+ -> {5\alpha-substrate} + NADP+}$

5α-DHP is a major hormone in circulation of normal cycling and pregnant women.

=== Testosterone ===
5α-Reductase is most known for converting testosterone, the male sex hormone, into the more potent dihydrotestosterone:

testosterone
+ NADPH
H^{+}
H^{+}
dihydrotestosterone
+ NADP^{+}

This removes the Δ^{4,5} double-bond on the A (leftmost) ring.

=== List of conversions ===
The following reactions are known to be catalyzed by 5α-reductase:

- Cholestenone → 5α-Cholestanone
- Progesterone → 5α-Dihydroprogesterone
- 3α-Dihydroprogesterone → Allopregnanolone
- 3β-Dihydroprogesterone → Isopregnanolone
- Deoxycorticosterone → 5α-Dihydrodeoxycorticosterone
- Corticosterone → 5α-Dihydrocorticosterone
- Aldosterone → 5α-Dihydroaldosterone
- Androstenedione → 5α-Androstanedione
- Testosterone → 5α-Dihydrotestosterone
- Nandrolone → 5α-Dihydronandrolone

== Structure ==
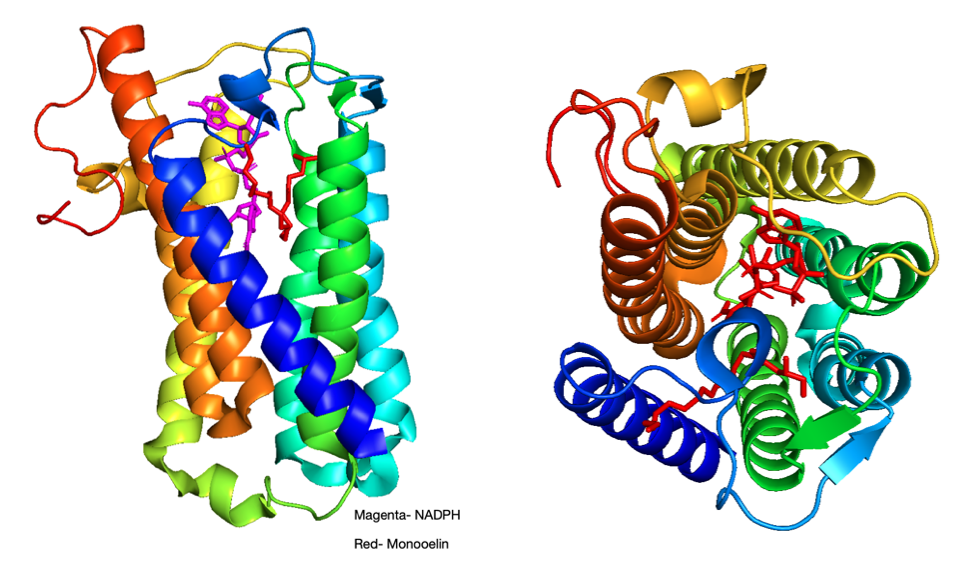
A side view of 5AR with monoolein and NADPH in the hydrophobic pocket; a view of the 7 transmembrane domains from the top

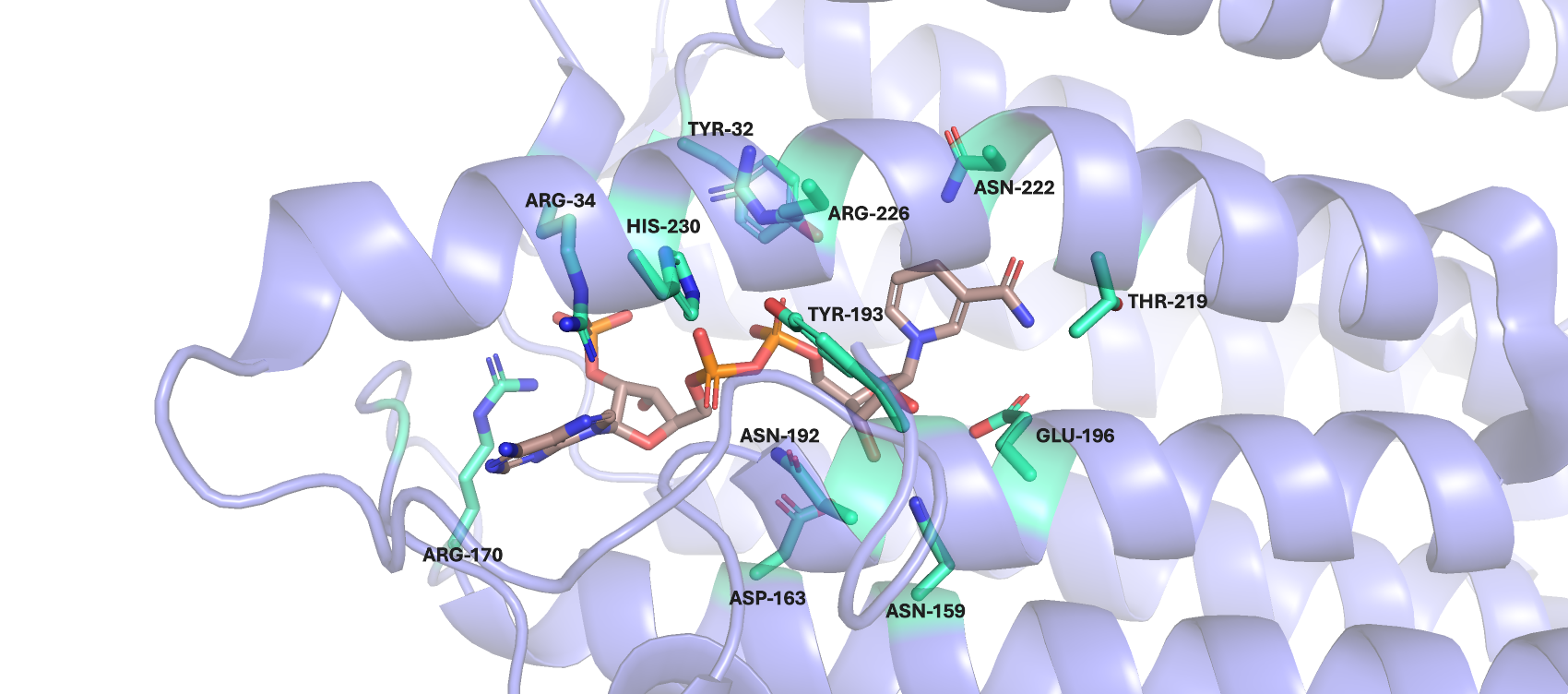
The 5α-reductase from Proteobacteria bacterium, PbSRD5a, binds NADPH using an extensive hydrogen-bonding network. NADPH is depicted in tan. The hydrogen-bonding residues are depicted in cyan. The cartoon of the overal PbSRD5a structure is depicted in slate. PDB: 7C83.

5α-Reductase is a membrane bound enzyme that catalyzes the NADPH dependent reduction of double bonds in steroid substrates to increase potency. The crystal structure of a homolog of 5α-reductase isoenzymes 1 and 2 has been found in Proteobacteria (proteobacteria 5α-reductase). This exists as a monomer with a seven alpha-helix transmembrane structure housing a hydrophobic pocket that holds cofactor NADPH and monoolein which occupies the steroid substrate binding pocket. In insect cells monoolein is not found, but is subbed out for other androgens and inhibitors. The integral seven transmembrane topology is likely conserved across species, with the N terminus in the endoplasmic reticulum lumen and the C terminus facing the cytosol. High conformational dynamics of the cytosolic region likely regulate NADPH/NADP+ exchange. Sequence conservation across known crystal structures has corroborated high conservation in enzyme structure.

In the 5α-reductase from Proteobacteria bacterium, PbSRD5A, NADPH is bound by an extensive hydrogen bonding network, including residues Arg34, which hydrogen bonds to the nicotinamide group, Arg170, which hydrogen bonds to the 2'-phosphate on the ribose group bound to nicotinamide, Asn192 and His230, which hydrogen bond to the nicotinamide nucleotide phosphate group, Tyr32 and Tyr193, which hydrogen bond to the adenine nucleotide phosphate group, and Asn159, Glu196, and Thr219, which hydrogen bond to the adenine group of NADPH. The steroid-binding pocket contains a motif of Gln, Glu, and Tyr residues, which form a triad of hydrogen-bonds, which coordinate the C3 ketone of steroids into close proximity to the nicotinamide of NADPH, which allows a hydride transfer and Δ^{4} double-bond reduction. These residues are Gln53, Glu54, and Tyr87 in PbSRD5A.

== Inhibition ==
The mechanism of 5α reductase inhibition is complex, but involves the binding of NADPH to the enzyme followed by the substrate. 5α-Reductase inhibitor drugs are used in benign prostatic hyperplasia, prostate cancer, pattern hair loss (androgenetic alopecia), and hormone replacement therapy for transgender women.

Inhibition of the enzyme can be classified into two categories: steroidal, which are irreversible, and nonsteroidal. There are more steroidal inhibitors, with examples including finasteride (MK-906), dutasteride (GG745), 4-MA, turosteride, MK-386, MK-434, and MK-963. Researchers have pursued synthesis of nonsteroidals to inhibit 5α-reductase due to the undesired side effects of steroidals. The most potent and selective inhibitors of 5α-R1 are found in this class, and include benzoquinolones, nonsteroidal aryl acids, butanoic acid derivatives, and more recognizably, polyunsaturated fatty acids (especially linolenic acid), zinc, and green tea. Riboflavin was also identified as a 5α-reductase inhibitor .

Additionally, it has been claimed that alfatradiol works through this mechanism of activity (5α-reductase), as well as the Ganoderic acids in lingzhi mushroom, and the Saw Palmetto.

Inhibition of 5α-reductase results in decreased conversion of testosterone to DHT, leading to increased testosterone and estradiol. Other enzymes compensate to a degree for the absent conversion, specifically with local expression at the skin of reductive 17β-hydroxysteroid dehydrogenase, oxidative 3α-hydroxysteroid dehydrogenase, and 3β-hydroxysteroid dehydrogenase enzymes.

Gynecomastia, erectile dysfunction, impaired cognitive function, fatigue, hypoglycemia, impaired liver function, constipation, and depression, are only a few of the possible side-effects of 5α-reductase inhibition. Long term side effects, that continued even after discontinuation of the drug have been reported.

=== Finasteride ===
Finasteride inhibits two 5α-reductase isoenzymes (II and III), while dutasteride inhibits all three. Finasteride potently inhibits 5α-R2 at a mean inhibitory concentration IC_{50} of 69 nM, but is less effective with 5α-R1 with an IC_{50} of 360 nM. Finasteride decreases mean serum level of DHT by 71% after 6 months, and was shown in vitro to inhibit 5α-R3 at a similar potency to 5α-R2 in transfected cell lines.

=== Dutasteride ===
Dutasteride inhibits 5α-reductase isoenzymes type 1 and 2 better than finasteride, leading to a more complete reduction in DHT at 24 weeks (94.7% versus 70.8%). It also reduces intraprostatic DHT 97% in men with prostate cancer at 5 mg/day over three months. A second study with 3.5 mg/day for 4 months decreased intraprostatic DHT even further by 99%. The suppression of DHT in vivo, and the report that dutasteride inhibits 5α-R3 in vitro suggest that dutasteride may be a triple 5α reductase inhibitor.

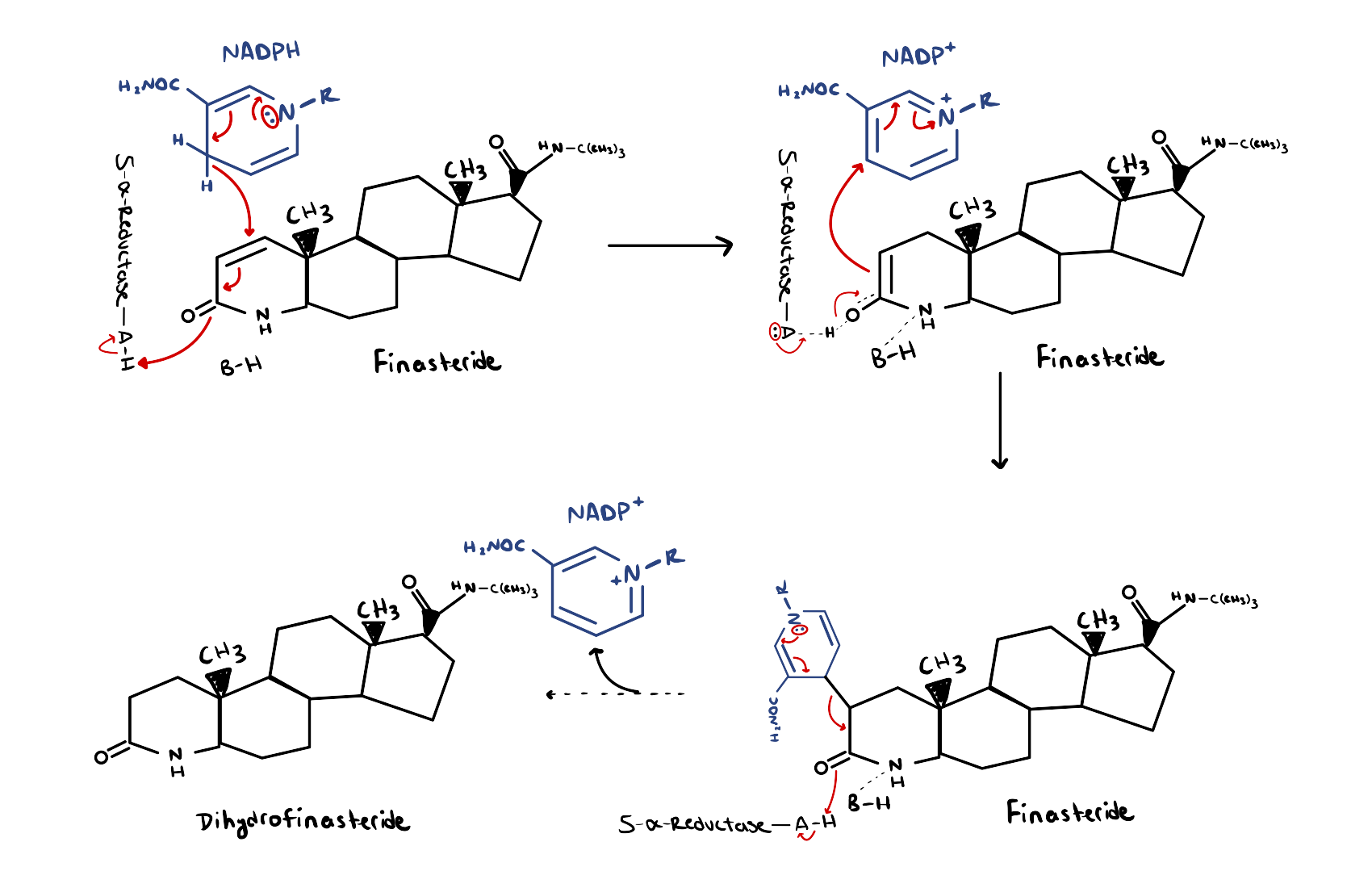
This is the mechanism of inhibition for Finasteride on 5α-reductase, Finasteride works to inhibit 5α-reductase through competitive inhibition which is why the mechanism shows the NADP+ getting attacked by the enolate formed rather than instant tautamerization occurring like in the case of 5α-reductase's work on testosterone. Finasteride does eventually get released from 5α-reductase enzyme-substrate complex which is why it is not considered a suicide inhibitor as the product eventually formed is dihydrofinasteride.

== Congenital deficiencies ==
=== 5α-Reductase 1 ===
5α-Reductase type 1 inactivated male mice have reduced bone mass and forelimb muscle grip strength, which has been proposed to be due to lack of 5α-reductase type 1 expression in bone and muscle. In 5 alpha reductase type 2 deficient males, the type 1 isoenzyme is thought to be responsible for their virilization at puberty.

=== 5α-Reductase 2 ===
Impaired 5α-reductase 2 activity can result from mutations in the underlying SRD5A2 gene. The condition, known as 5α-reductase 2 deficiency, has a range of presentations as atypical appearances of the external genitalia in males. This is because 5α-reductase 2 catalyzes the transformation of testosterone to the potent androgen dihydrotestosterone, which is required for the proper masculinization of male genitalia.

=== 5α-Reductase 3 ===
When small interfering RNA is used to knock down the expression of 5α-R3 isozyme in cell lines, there is decreased cell growth, viability, and a decrease in DHT/T ratios. It has also shown the ability to reduce testosterone, androstenedione, and progesterone in androgen stimulated prostate cell lines by adenovirus vectors.

Congenital deficiency of 5α-R3 at the gene SRD5A3 has been linked to a rare, autosomal recessive condition in which patients are born with severe intellectual dysfunction and cerebellar and ocular defects. The presumed deficiency is reduction of the terminal bond of polyprenol to dolichol, an important step in N-glycosylation of proteins, which in turn is important for proper folding of asparagine residues on nascent protein in the endoplasmic reticulum.

== Nervous system ==
=== Affective disorders ===
Isolation rearing has been shown to lower protein expression of 5α-reductase isoenzymes 1 and 2 in cortical and subcortical brain regions of rat models. However, the amount of 5α-reduced metabolite remained unaffected. This means isolation rearing likely leads to changes in the expression and activity of 5α-reductase in the brain, leading to dysregulation of dopamine neurotransmission, resulting in early chronic stress Treatment with finasteride, a 5α-reductase inhibitor, has been shown to mimic the effects of SSRI's causing sexual dysfunction. Research has shown that 5α-reductase is the rate-limiting enzyme in neurosteroid synthesis, specifically in the conversion of progesterone to allopregnanolone, low levels of allopregnanolone has been tied to depression, anxiety and schizophrenia. Sleep deprivation can enhance 5α-reductase expression and activity in the prefrontal cortex, leading to mania-related symptoms in rats. It is also contested whether the use of 5α-reductase inhibitors is associated with suicidal ideation and depression in patient populations who use them for benign prostatic hyperplasia. These symptoms have been found during active use of inhibitors and in immediate followup. However, it is unknown if these symptoms arise naturally from benign prostatic hyperplasia.

=== Hypothalamic–pituitary–adrenal axis dysfunction ===
An alternative mechanism of cortisol regulation is regulated via 5α-reductase which catalyzes an A-ring reduction of cortisol, metabolizing the compound. Type 1 and 2 of 5α-reductase are the principal enzymes involved in cortisol clearance through the liver. Excess cortisol has been tied to metabolic dysfunction–associated steatotic liver disease (MASLD), but in-vitro studies have found that an over expression of 5α-reductase type 2 can suppress lipogenesis. The key role of 5α-reductase in cortisol breakdown and fat buildup has elucidated some of the side effects of 5α-reductase inhibitors. In randomized studies on human volunteers it was found that 5α-reductase inhibition through the use of dutasteride and finasteride can lead to hepatic lipid accumulation in men. In critical illness, overstimulation of cortisol as part of a stress response can lead to decreased clearance of cortisol through the liver via 5α-reductase and kidneys via 11β-hydroxysteroid dehydrogenase type 2, longterm elevation of cortisol can lead to Cushing's syndrome.

== Nomenclature ==
This enzyme belongs to the family of oxidoreductases, to be specific, those acting on the CH-CH group of donor with other acceptors. The systematic name of this enzyme class is 3-oxo-5α-steroid:acceptor Δ^{4}-oxidoreductase. Other names in common use include:

- 5α-Reductase
- 3-Oxosteroid Δ^{4}-dehydrogenase
- 3-Oxo-5α-steroid Δ^{4}-dehydrogenase
- Steroid Δ^{4}-5α-reductase
- Δ^{4-3}-Keto steroid 5α-reductase
- Δ^{4-3}-Oxo steroid reductase
- Δ^{4-3}-Ketosteroid-5α-oxidoreductase
- Δ^{4-3}-Oxosteroid-5α-reductase
- 3-Keto-Δ^{4}-steroid-5α-reductase
- Testosterone 5α-reductase
- 4-Ene-3-ketosteroid-5α-oxidoreductase
- Δ^{4}-5α-Dehydrogenase
- 3-Oxo-5α-steroid:(acceptor) Δ^{4}-oxidoreductase

== See also ==
- Steroidogenic enzyme
- Acne vulgaris
- Cholestenone 5α-reductase
- Hirsutism
- Lower urinary tract symptoms
- Polyendocrine metabolic ovarian syndrome
- List of steroid metabolism modulators
