= 5α-Dihydrocorticosterone =

Names
- IUPAC name 11β,21-Dihydroxy-5α-pregnane-3,20-dione
- Systematic IUPAC name (1S,3aS,3bS,5aS,9aS,9bS,10S,11aS)-10-Hydroxy-1-(hydroxyacetyl)-9a,11a-dimethylhexadecahydro-7H-cyclopenta[a]phenanthren-7-one

Identifiers
CAS Number	298-25-9
3D model (JSmol)	Interactive image
ChemSpider	2338305
PubChem CID	3080546
CompTox Dashboard (EPA)	DTXSID80952235
- InChI: InChI=1S/C21H32O4/c1-20-8-7-13(23)9-12(20)3-4-14-15-5-6-16(18(25)11-22)21(15,2)10-17(24)19(14)20/h12,14-17,19,22,24H,3-11H2,1-2H3/t12-,14-,15-,16+,17-,19+,20-,21-/m0/s1
- SMILES: CC12CCC(=O)CC1CCC3C2C(CC4(C3CCC4C(=O)CO)C)O

Properties
Chemical formula	C_{21}H_{32}O_{4}
Molar mass	348.47638 g/mol
- Except where otherwise noted, data are given for materials in their standard state (at 25 °C [77 °F], 100 kPa). Infobox references

5α-Dihydrocorticosterone (5α-DHC, 5α-DHB), also known as 11β,21-dihydroxy-5α-pregnane-3,20-dione, is a naturally occurring, endogenous glucocorticoid steroid hormone and neurosteroid. It is biosynthesized from corticosterone by the enzyme 5α-reductase. DHC has central depressant effects and impairs long-term potentiation in animals.

== See also ==
- Tetrahydrocorticosterone
- 5α-Dihydroprogesterone
- Dihydrodeoxycorticosterone
- Tetrahydrodeoxycorticosterone
- Allopregnanolone
