= Vulvitis =

Inflammation of the vulva

Vulvitis is inflammation of the vulva, the external female mammalian genitalia that include the labia majora, labia minora, clitoris, and introitus (the entrance to the vagina). It may co-occur as vulvovaginitis with vaginitis, inflammation of the vagina, and may have infectious or non-infectious causes. The warm and moist conditions of the vulva make it easily affected. Vulvitis is prone to occur in any female especially those who have certain sensitivities, infections, allergies, or diseases that make them likely to have vulvitis. Postmenopausal women and prepubescent girls are more prone to be affected by it, as compared to women in their menstruation period. It is so because they have low estrogen levels which makes their vulvar tissue thin and dry. Women having diabetes are also prone to be affected by vulvitis due to the high sugar content in their cells, increasing their vulnerability. Vulvitis is not a disease, it is just an inflammation caused by an infection, allergy or injury. Vulvitis may also be symptom of any sexually transmitted infection or a fungal infection.

== Causes ==
Vulvitis may be caused by the following reasons:

1. Allergies or sensitivities towards certain products like - coloured or perfumed toilet papers, vaginal sprays or douches, shampoos and hair conditioners, laundry detergents, creams or medications.
2. Reactions to - bubble bath or soaps used on genital area, spermicides, sanitary napkins.
3. Irritations caused by - a yeast infection, chlorinated water in swimming pools or hot tubs, synthetic underwear or nylon pantyhose without a breathable cotton crotch, wearing a wet bathing suit for a long time, bike or horseback riding, douching, poor personal hygiene, incontinence, by urine or stool if it remains in contact with the vulva (as may occur in women who have incontinence or are confined to bed), contact with urine and stool sometimes cause ongoing (chronic) vulvitis.
4. Infections such as - vaginitis, genital herpes, viral and fungal infection.
5. Factors such as - Diabetes, scabies or pubic lice, eczema or dermatitis, oral sex.

== Symptoms and signs ==
The symptoms of vulvitis are:

1. Extreme and constant itching
2. A burning sensation in the vulvar area
3. Vaginal discharge
4. Small cracks on the skin of the vulva
5. Redness and swelling on the vulva and its labia (lips of the vulva)
6. clear fluid-filled blisters on the vulva
7. Scaly, thick, whitish patches on the vulva
8. Bumps or warts
9. Soreness
10. Pain with sex
11. Increased sensitivity when wiping with toilet paper

Symptoms of vulvitis may also be an indication of other diseases or disorders. A doctor should be consulted when one is having any of these symptoms. The symptoms may vary on depending on the cause and the time period it has been infected for.

== Diagnosis ==
Vulvitis can have many different causes which makes the diagnosis difficult. The diagnosis of vulvitis starts with examining the medical history and pelvic examination of the person affected by it. Other diagnostic tools like pap smears, urine tests, blood tests and tests for sexually transmitted infections are also done.

== In children ==
Vulvitis can have a variety of etiologies in children and adolescents, including allergic dermatitis, contact dermatitis, lichen sclerosus, and infections with bacteria, fungi, and parasites. Dermatitis in infants is commonly caused by a soiled diaper being left on for an extended period of time. Increasing the frequency of diaper changes and topical application of emollients are sufficient to resolve most cases. Dermatitis of the vulva in older children is usually caused by exposure to an irritant (e.g. scented products that come into contact with the vulva, laundry detergent, soaps, etc.) and is treated with preventing exposure and encouraging sitz baths with baking soda as the vulvar skin heals. Other treatment options for vulvar dermatitis include oral hydroxyzine hydrochloride or topical hydrocortisone.

Lichen sclerosus is another common cause of vulvitis in children, and it often affects an hourglass or figure eight-shaped area of skin around the anus and vulva. Symptoms of a mild case include skin fissures, loss of skin pigment (hypopigmentation), skin atrophy, a parchment-like texture to the skin, dysuria, itching, discomfort, and excoriation. In more severe cases, the vulva may become discolored, developing dark purple bruising (ecchymosis), bleeding, scarring, attenuation of the labia minora, and fissures and bleeding affecting the posterior fourchette. Its cause is unknown, but likely genetic or autoimmune, and it is unconnected to malignancy in children. If the skin changes are not obvious on visual inspection, a biopsy of the skin may be performed to acquire an exact diagnosis. Treatment for vulvar lichen sclerosus may consist of topical hydrocortisone in mild cases, or stronger topical steroids (e.g. clobetasol propionate). Preliminary studies show that 75% of cases do not resolve with puberty.

Organisms responsible for vulvitis in children include pinworms (Enterobius vermicularis), Candida yeast, and group A hemolytic Streptococcus. Though pinworms mainly affect the perianal area, they can cause itching and irritation to the vulva as well. Pinworms are treated with albendazole. Vulvar Candida infections are uncommon in children, and generally occur in infants after antibiotic therapy, and in children with diabetes or immunodeficiency. Candida infections cause a red raised vulvar rash with satellite lesions and clear borders, and are diagnosed by microscopically examining a sample treated with potassium hydroxide for hyphae. They are treated with topical butoconazole, clotrimazole, or miconazole. Streptococcus infections are characterized by a dark red discoloration of the vulva and introitus, and cause pain, itching, bleeding, and dysuria. They are treated with antibiotics.

== Zoon vulvitis (Plasma cell vulvitis) ==
This is an uncommon, benign condition which was originally described in the glans penis of older men but has a counterpart in women under a variety of terms (Zoon vulvitis, vulvitis circumscripta plasmacellularis, plasmacytosis mucosae).

Most patients are adult, in reproductive age or postmenopausal (age range 26–70 years). Lesions on the vulva are usually asymptomatic, composed of solitary or multiple, sharply defined, red-brown, shiny patches which frequently exhibit a speckled and hemorrhagic surface. Ulceration commonly supervenes. Treatment includes topical steroids for symptomatic relief. Rarely excision for refractory lesions.

Microscopic Findings:

1. Dense plasma cell-rich band-like infiltrate in papillary and upper reticular dermis
2. Spongiotic epidermis with absent stratum granulosum and stratum corneum
3. “Lozenge”-shaped configuration of superficial keratinocytes
4. Vascular proliferation in superficial submucosa with red cell extravasation and/or hemosiderin
