= C21H32O4 =

The molecular formula C_{21}H_{32}O_{4} (molar mass: 348.48 g/mol) may refer to:

- Alfadolone
- Cannabiripsol
- 5α-Dihydrocorticosterone, or 11β,21-dihydroxy-5α-pregnane-3,20-dione
