= Tetrahydrocorticosterone =

Names
- IUPAC name 3α,11β,21-Trihydroxy-5β-pregnan-20-one
- Systematic IUPAC name 1-[(1S,3aS,3bS,5aR,7R,9aS,9bS,10S,11aS)-7,10-Dihydroxy-9a,11a-dimethylhexadecahydro-1H-cyclopenta[a]phenanthren-1-yl]-2-hydroxyethan-1-one
- Other names 3α,5α-Tetrahydrocorticosterone; 5β-Pregnane-3α,11β,21-triol-20-one

Identifiers
CAS Number	68-42-8
3D model (JSmol)	Interactive image
ChemSpider	17215927
ECHA InfoCard	100.000.627
PubChem CID	65553
UNII	PUW84K2LEC
CompTox Dashboard (EPA)	DTXSID901015843
- InChI: InChI=1S/C21H34O4/c1-20-8-7-13(23)9-12(20)3-4-14-15-5-6-16(18(25)11-22)21(15,2)10-17(24)19(14)20/h12-17,19,22-24H,3-11H2,1-2H3/t12-,13-,14+,15+,16-,17+,19-,20+,21+/m1/s1 Key: RHQQHZQUAMFINJ-DTDWNVJFSA-N
- SMILES: C[C@]12C[C@H](O)[C@H]3[C@@H](CC[C@@H]4C[C@H](O)CC[C@@]43C)[C@@H]1CC[C@@H]2C(=O)CO

Properties
Chemical formula	C_{21}H_{34}O_{4}
Molar mass	350.499 g·mol^{−1}
- Except where otherwise noted, data are given for materials in their standard state (at 25 °C [77 °F], 100 kPa). Infobox references

3α,5α-Tetrahydrocorticosterone (3α,5α-THB), or simply tetrahydrocorticosterone (THB or THCC), is an endogenous glucocorticoid hormone.

== See also ==
- 5α-Dihydrocorticosterone
- Tetrahydrodeoxycorticosterone
- Dihydrodeoxycorticosterone
- Allopregnanolone
- Tetrahydrocortisone
- Tetrahydrocortisol
