= CMP-sialic acid transporter =

Protein found in humans

SLC35A1

Identifiers
- Aliases: SLC35A1, CDG2F, CMPST, CST, hCST, Solute carrier family 35 (CMP-sialic acid transporter), member A1, solute carrier family 35 member A1
- External IDs: OMIM: 605634; MGI: 1345622; GeneCards: SLC35A1

Gene location (Human)
Chr.	Chromosome 6 (human)
Band	6q15	Start	87,470,623 bp
Band	6q15	End	87,512,336 bp

Gene location (Mouse)
Chr.	Chromosome 4 (mouse)
Band	4|4 A5	Start	34,663,257 bp
Band	4|4 A5	End	34,687,438 bp
RNA expression pattern
Bgee	Human / Mouse (ortholog); Top expressed in: monocyte; rectum; gonad; right lung; Achilles tendon; granulocyte; cerebellar hemisphere; transverse colon; mucosa of transverse colon; endometrium / Top expressed in: conjunctival fornix; left colon; cornea; submandibular gland; corneal stroma; epithelium of lens; Paneth cell; Epithelium of choroid plexus; right kidney; epithelium of stomach; More reference expression data
BioGPS	n/a
Gene ontology
Molecular function	CMP-N-acetylneuraminate transmembrane transporter activity; pyrimidine nucleotide-sugar transmembrane transporter activity; sialic acid transmembrane transporter activity
Cellular component	integral component of membrane; Golgi membrane; Golgi apparatus; integral component of plasma membrane; membrane; integral component of Golgi membrane
Biological process	CMP-N-acetylneuraminate transmembrane transport; carbohydrate transport; carbohydrate metabolic process; pyrimidine nucleotide-sugar transmembrane transport; sialic acid transport
Sources:Amigo / QuickGO
Orthologs
Databases	NCBI: entry; OMA: entry
Species	Human	Mouse
Entrez	10559	24060
Ensembl	ENSG00000164414	ENSMUSG00000028293
UniProt	P78382	Q61420
RefSeq (mRNA)	NM_006416; NM_001168398	NM_011895
RefSeq (protein)	NP_001161870; NP_006407	NP_036025
Location (UCSC)	Chr 6: 87.47 – 87.51 Mb	Chr 4: 34.66 – 34.69 Mb
PubMed search
- Wikidata
View/Edit Human	View/Edit Mouse

CMP-sialic acid transporter is a protein that in humans is encoded by the SLC35A1 gene. Mutations are associated with the vascular condition SLC35A1-CDG.

== See also ==
- Solute carrier family
