= SRD5A3-CDG =

- Other names: CDG syndrome type Iq, CDG-Iq, CDG1Q or Congenital disorder of Glycosylation type 1q
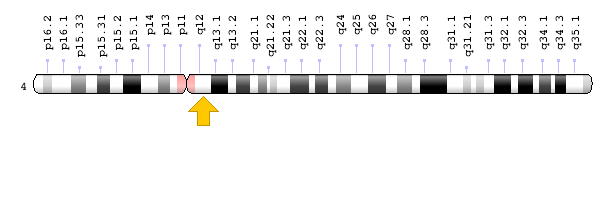
- SRD5A3 gene
- Specialty: Medical genetics
- Causes: Mutation in the steroid 5 alpha reductase type 3 gene
- Frequency: Ultra rare

SRD5A3-CDG (also known as CDG syndrome type Iq, CDG-Iq, CDG1Q or Congenital disorder of glycosylation type 1q) is a rare, non X-linked congenital disorder of glycosylation (CDG) due to a mutation in the steroid 5 alpha reductase type 3 gene. It is one of over 150 documented types of Congenital disorders of Glycosylation. Like many other CDGs, SRD5A3 is ultra-rare, with around 38 documented cases in the world.

It is an inheritable autosomal recessive disorder that causes developmental delays and problems with vision. The gene is located at 4q12, which is the long (q) arm of chromosome 4 at position 12.

== Presentation ==
SRD5A3-CDG is characterized by a highly variable phenotype. Typical clinical manifestations include:

- Global developmental delays
- Hypotonia or reduced muscle tone (as early as the first six months of life)
- Eye problems, including severe visual impairment, nystagmus (rapid involuntary rhythmic movements) of the eyes
- Abnormal facial shape with deep-set eyes and orbital hypertelorism (increased distance between eyes)
- Neurological abnormalities that impair balance and movement coordination
- Intellectual disability
- Ichthyosiform skin lesions, or thickening of skin leading to dry, flaky skin

Less common manifestations may include:

- Other variable ocular anomalies such as optic nerve hypoplasia/atrophy, iris and optic nerve coloboma, congenital cataract, retinitis pigmentosa, glaucoma and increased pressure in the eyeball
- Congenital heart abnormalities
- Cerebellar abnormalities, which can result in ataxia (impaired muscle coordination)
- Kyphosis, or exaggerated forward rounding of the back due to increased curvature of the upper spine
- Coagulation abnormalities ranging from increased tendency to bleed to excessing clotting due to antithrombin III activity
- Hypertrichosis or excessive hair growth
- Hypothyroidism
- Growth hormone deficiency

== Molecular mechanism ==
The protein encoded by the SRD5A3 gene is involved in the production of androgen 5-alpha-dihydrotestosterone (DHT) from testosterone, and maintenance of the androgen-androgen receptor activation pathway.

This protein is also necessary for the conversion of polyprenol into dolichol, which is required for the synthesis of dolichol-linked monosaccharides and the oligosaccharide precursor used for N-linked glycosylation of proteins. Dolichol is a key building block in the body's glycosylation process. Typically, the dolichol generated is further modified into dolichol-linked oligosaccharide (DLO) by the addition of phosphates and sugars. Complex sugar molecules get added to DLO and are then transferred onto proteins. When insufficient DLO is produced in the body, many proteins are inadequately glycosylated.

Both glycosylation defects and an accumulation of polyprenol have been observed in SRD5A3-CDG patients and mouse models, and it is not currently known whether the disease is caused due to incorrect glycosylation, polyprenol accumulation, or a combination of the two.

== Diagnosis ==
Confirmation of clinical diagnosis for SRD5A3-CDG requires genetic testing and gene sequencing to identify deleterious mutations in the SRD5A3 gene. Other diagnostic tools include Isoelectrofocusing of Transferrin (TIEF), an assay from transferrin levels in blood, to screen for N-glycosylation defects which occur in CDGs. A CDG blood analysis test using mass spectrometry technology is also available.

As SRD5A3-CDG is also an inheritable disorder, parental genetic testing can indicate if one or both of the parents are carriers of the faulty gene. The gene is recessive in nature, so if both parents are carriers of the condition, there is a 25% chance that the offspring will have SRD5A3-CDG.

== Treatment ==
At present, there is no available treatment for SRD5A3-CDG. However, the disorder can be managed and some of the symptoms can be treated. Some eye problems that manifest with SRD5A3-CDG can be surgically corrected and coagulation disorders may be treated.

The quality of life is mainly determined by the nature and the degree of the brain and eye involvement. Ongoing care and management for individuals with SRD5A3-CDG typically includes a combination of physical therapy (to alleviate issues pertaining to reduced muscle tone, mobility, etc.), occupational therapy (for vision and speech impairments) and palliative measures, where needed.

When a genetic risk or anomaly is identified, parents may have access to counselling to prepare them for any special needs their child may have and approaches on managing their condition as they grow.

== Documented cases ==
SRD5A3-CDG is an ultra-rare disorder with a frequency of less than 1 in 10 million. As of 2018, there were at least 38 reported cases of SRD5A3-CDG from 26 different families. While the exact number of patients worldwide is unknown, most recorded cases so far have been reported from Afghanistan, the Czech Republic, Iran, Pakistan, Poland, Puerto Rico and Turkey.

== Research ==
SRD5A3-CDG is caused by a single-gene mutation, which makes it an attractive candidate for gene therapy. However, due to the extreme rarity of the disorder, research around it has been limited.

Research has predominantly been focused on two types of research models: Cell-based models and model organisms.

Common cell-based models include patient cells such as fibroblast cells derived from skin samples (patient-derived fibroblasts [PDFs]), induced pluripotent stem cells (iPSCs) created by reprogramming fibroblasts, and specialized cells, such as neurons derived from stem cell differentiation. Patient-derived cell models are important preclinical model systems as they contain the same genome and mutation(s) as the patient, allowing researchers to assess potential therapies for individual patients early on in the drug development process. For SRD5A3-CDG, patient-derived cell models could be crucial in understanding the impact of polyprenol reductase enzyme deficiency and be used to investigate various treatment options such as dietary supplementation, novel or repurposed drugs and gene therapy.

Model organisms like worms, zebrafish and mice have been genetically modified to study the impact of several mutations, including those in the SRD5A3 gene. Researchers in the United States and France have been working on genetically modified mice that have SRD5A3 mutations limited to the cerebellum region of their brain. These mice are viable, show CDG symptoms in the brain, and are part of planned studies for new experimental treatments.

== See also ==
- SRD5A3
- Congenital disorder of glycosylation
- Kahrizi syndrome, a syndrome caused by a mutation in this gene
