= 5α-Dihydroaldosterone =

Names
- IUPAC name 11β,21-Dihydroxy-3,20-dioxo-5α-pregnan-18-al
- Preferred IUPAC name (1S,3aS,3bS,5aS,9aS,9bS,10S,11aR)-10-Hydroxy-1-(hydroxyacetyl)-9a-methyl-7-oxohexadecahydro-11aH-cyclopenta[a]phenanthrene-11a-carbaldehyde

Identifiers
CAS Number	70952-53-3
3D model (JSmol)	Interactive image
ChemSpider	20087956
PubChem CID	21151227
UNII	25D5K41TX4
- InChI: InChI=1S/C21H30O5/c1-20-7-6-13(24)8-12(20)2-3-14-15-4-5-16(18(26)10-22)21(15,11-23)9-17(25)19(14)20/h11-12,14-17,19,22,25H,2-10H2,1H3/t12-,14-,15-,16+,17-,19+,20-,21+/m0/s1 Key: IIBOWSHDTFRYKU-WHIQTFJJSA-N
- SMILES: C[C@]12CCC(=O)C[C@@H]1CC[C@@H]3[C@@H]2[C@H](C[C@]4([C@H]3CC[C@@H]4C(=O)CO)C=O)O

Properties
Chemical formula	C_{21}H_{30}O_{5}
Molar mass	362.466 g/mol
- Except where otherwise noted, data are given for materials in their standard state (at 25 °C [77 °F], 100 kPa). Infobox references

5α-Dihydroaldosterone is a metabolite of aldosterone that is formed by 5α-reductase. It is a potent antinatriuretic agent similarly to but somewhat different from aldosterone. It is produced in the kidneys.
