= Cholestenone 5alpha-reductase =

Class of enzymes

cholestenone 5-alpha-reductase

Identifiers
- EC no.: 1.3.1.22
- CAS no.: 37255-34-8

Databases
- IntEnz: IntEnz view
- BRENDA: BRENDA entry
- ExPASy: NiceZyme view
- KEGG: KEGG entry
- MetaCyc: metabolic pathway
- PRIAM: profile
- PDB structures: RCSB PDB PDBe PDBsum
- Gene Ontology: AmiGO / QuickGO
Search
- PMC: articles
- PubMed: articles
- NCBI: proteins

In enzymology, cholestenone 5alpha-reductase (EC 1.3.1.22) is an enzyme that catalyzes several chemical reactions of steroids in which a cholest-4-en-3-one is converted to the corresponding 5α-dihydrocholestan-3-one. For example, 5α-dihydroprogesterone is the product of the reduction of progesterone:

Progesterone
+ NADPH
H^{+}
H^{+}
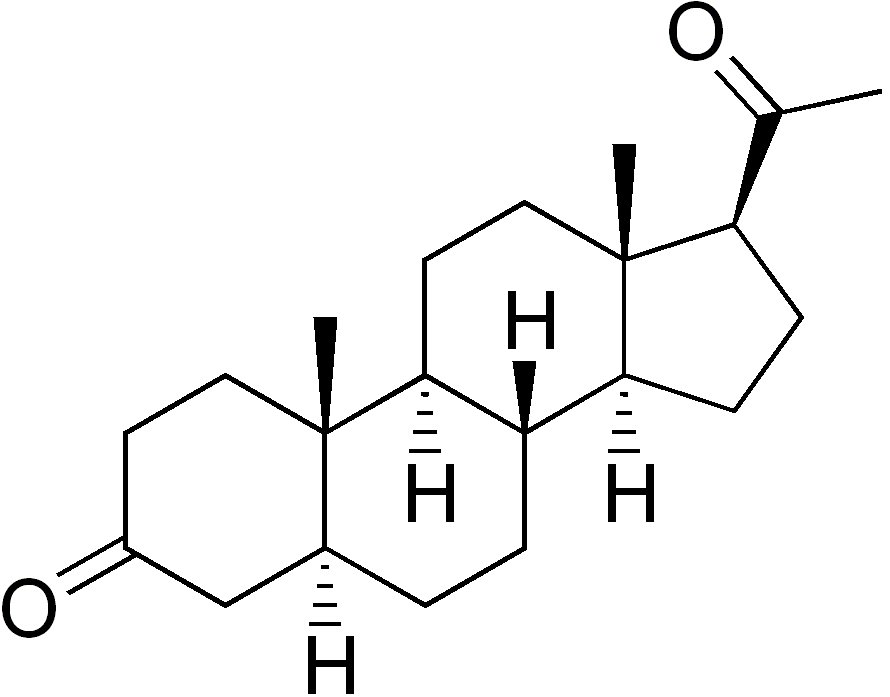
5α-Dihydroprogesterone
+ NADP^{+}

The enzyme uses the cofactor, reduced nicotinamide adenine dinucleotide phosphate (NADPH).

This enzyme belongs to the family of oxidoreductases, specifically those acting on the CH-CH group of donor with NAD+ or NADP+ as acceptor. The systematic name of this enzyme class is 3-oxo-5alpha-steroid:NADP+ Delta4-oxidoreductase. Other names in common use include testosterone Delta4-5alpha-reductase, steroid 5alpha-reductase, 3-oxosteroid Delta4-dehydrogenase, 5alpha-reductase, steroid 5alpha-hydrogenase, 3-oxosteroid 5alpha-reductase, testosterone Delta4-hydrogenase, 4-ene-3-oxosteroid 5alpha-reductase, reduced nicotinamide adenine dinucleotide, phosphate:Delta4-3-ketosteroid 5alpha-oxidoreductase, 4-ene-5alpha-reductase, Delta4-3-ketosteroid 5alpha-oxidoreductase, cholest-4-en-3-one 5alpha-reductase, and testosterone 5alpha-reductase.
