= SRD5A3 =

Protein-coding gene in the species Homo sapiens

Identifiers
- Aliases: SRD5A3, CDG1P, CDG1Q, KRIZI, SRD5A2L, SRD5A2L1, steroid 5 alpha-reductase 3
- External IDs: OMIM: 611715; MGI: 1930252; GeneCards: SRD5A3
Enzyme activity
EC #	BRENDA	ExPASy	KEGG	MetaCyc
1.3.1.22	↗	↗	↗	↗
1.3.1.94	↗	↗	↗	↗

Gene location (Human)
Chr.	Chromosome 4 (human)
Band	4q12	Start	55,346,213 bp
Band	4q12	End	55,373,100 bp

Gene location (Mouse)
Chr.	Chromosome 5 (mouse)
Band	5|5 C3.3	Start	76,288,118 bp
Band	5|5 C3.3	End	76,303,351 bp
RNA expression pattern
Bgee	Human / Mouse (ortholog); Top expressed in: palpebral conjunctiva; gallbladder; olfactory zone of nasal mucosa; mucosa of esophagus; body of pancreas; skin of thigh; gingival epithelium; gonad; C1 segment; epithelium of nasopharynx / Top expressed in: lumbar spinal ganglion; granulocyte; secondary oocyte; zygote; primary oocyte; internal carotid artery; yolk sac; lip; external carotid artery; stroma of bone marrow; More reference expression data
BioGPS	n/a
Gene ontology
Molecular function	oxidoreductase activity, acting on the CH-CH group of donors; cholestenone 5-alpha-reductase activity; oxidoreductase activity; 3-oxo-5-alpha-steroid 4-dehydrogenase activity; oxidoreductase activity, acting on the CH-CH group of donors, NAD or NADP as acceptor; polyprenol reductase activity
Cellular component	cytoplasm; integral component of membrane; endoplasmic reticulum membrane; membrane; endoplasmic reticulum
Biological process	lipid metabolism; polyprenol catabolic process; androgen biosynthetic process; protein glycosylation; dolichol metabolic process; dolichyl diphosphate biosynthetic process; dolichol-linked oligosaccharide biosynthetic process; dolichol biosynthetic process
Sources:Amigo / QuickGO
Orthologs
Databases	NCBI: entry; OMA: entry
Species	Human	Mouse
Entrez	79644	57357
Ensembl	ENSG00000128039	ENSMUSG00000029233
UniProt	Q9H8P0	Q9WUP4
RefSeq (mRNA)	NM_024592	NM_020611
RefSeq (protein)	NP_078868	NP_065636
Location (UCSC)	Chr 4: 55.35 – 55.37 Mb	Chr 5: 76.29 – 76.3 Mb
PubMed search
- Wikidata
View/Edit Human	View/Edit Mouse

Steroid 5-alpha-reductase 3, also known as 3-oxo-5-alpha-steroid 4-dehydrogenase 3, is an enzyme that in humans is encoded by the SRD5A3 gene. It is one of three forms of 5α-reductase. Unlike SRD5A1 and SRD5A2, SRD5A3 has no apparent form in androgen processing or signaling. Instead, SRD5A3 reduces polyprenol to dolichol, which is necessary for N-linked glycosylation of proteins and some lipids.

== See also ==
- SRD5A3-CDG
- Congenital disorder of glycosylation
- Kahrizi syndrome, a syndrome caused by a mutation in this gene
