= Tetrahydrocortisol =

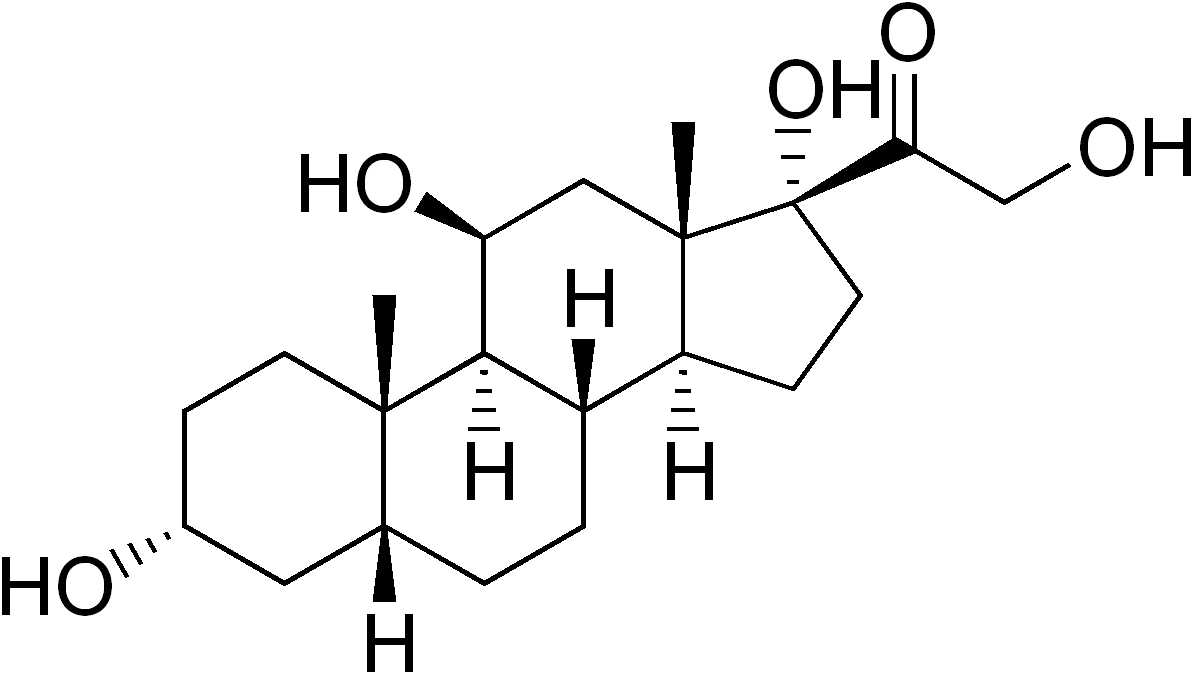

Names
- IUPAC name 3α,11β,17,21-Tetrahydroxy-5β-pregnan-20-one
- Systematic IUPAC name 2-Hydroxy-1-(1R,3aS,3bS,5aR,7R,9aS,9bS,10S,11aS)-1,7,10-trihydroxy-9a,11a-dimethylhexadecahydro-1H-cyclopenta[a]phenanthren-1-yl]ethan-1-one
- Other names Urocortisol; 3α,5β-Tetrahydrocortisol; 3α,5β-Cortisol

Identifiers
CAS Number	53-02-1
3D model (JSmol)	Interactive image
ChEBI	CHEBI:28320
ChemSpider	5655
ECHA InfoCard	100.000.146
PubChem CID	5864
UNII	7P2O6MFN8O
CompTox Dashboard (EPA)	DTXSID601018917
- InChI: InChI=1S/C21H34O5/c1-19-7-5-13(23)9-12(19)3-4-14-15-6-8-21(26,17(25)11-22)20(15,2)10-16(24)18(14)19/h12-16,18,22-24,26H,3-11H2,1-2H3/t12-,13-,14+,15+,16+,18-,19+,20+,21+/m1/s1 Key: AODPIQQILQLWGS-GXBDJPPSSA-N; InChI=1/C21H34O5/c1-19-7-5-13(23)9-12(19)3-4-14-15-6-8-21(26,17(25)11-22)20(15,2)10-16(24)18(14)19/h12-16,18,22-24,26H,3-11H2,1-2H3/t12-,13-,14+,15+,16+,18-,19+,20+,21+/m1/s1 Key: AODPIQQILQLWGS-GXBDJPPSBG
- SMILES: O=C(CO)[C@@]4(O)CC[C@H]3[C@H]2[C@@H]([C@@]1([C@@H](C[C@H](O)CC1)CC2)C)[C@@H](O)C[C@@]34C

Properties
Chemical formula	C_{21}H_{34}O_{5}
Molar mass	366.49 g/mol
- Except where otherwise noted, data are given for materials in their standard state (at 25 °C [77 °F], 100 kPa). verify (what is ?) Infobox references

Tetrahydrocortisol, or urocortisol, also known as 3α,11β,17α,21-tetrahydroxy-5β-pregnan-20-one, is a steroid and an inactive metabolite of cortisol.

Tetrahydrocortisol is a neurosteroid and has been found to act as a negative allosteric modulator of the GABA_{A} receptor, similarly to pregnenolone sulfate.

== See also ==
- Tetrahydrocortisone
- Tetrahydrocorticosterone
