= 5α-Dihydrocortisol =

Names
- IUPAC name 11β,17α,21-Trihydroxy-5α-pregnane-3,20-dione
- Systematic IUPAC name (1R,3aS,3bS,5aS,9aS,9bS,10S,11aS)-1,10-Dihydroxy-1-(hydroxyacetyl)-9a,11a-dimethylhexadecahydro-7H-cyclopenta[a]phenanthren-7-one
- Other names Hydrallostane; 5α-DHF; Allodihydrocortisol

Identifiers
CAS Number	516-41-6
3D model (JSmol)	Interactive image
ChEMBL	ChEMBL1079111
ChemSpider	16735853
PubChem CID	12816693
UNII	364XCM54BS
CompTox Dashboard (EPA)	DTXSID101315934
- InChI: InChI=1S/C21H32O5/c1-19-7-5-13(23)9-12(19)3-4-14-15-6-8-21(26,17(25)11-22)20(15,2)10-16(24)18(14)19/h12,14-16,18,22,24,26H,3-11H2,1-2H3/t12-,14-,15-,16-,18+,19-,20-,21-/m0/s1 Key: ACSFOIGNUQUIGE-SERXDUEGSA-N
- SMILES: C[C@]12CCC(=O)C[C@@H]1CC[C@@H]3[C@@H]2[C@H](C[C@]4([C@H]3CC[C@@]4(C(=O)CO)O)C)O

Properties
Chemical formula	C_{21}H_{32}O_{5}
Molar mass	364.482 g/mol
- Except where otherwise noted, data are given for materials in their standard state (at 25 °C [77 °F], 100 kPa). Infobox references

5α-Dihydrocortisol (5α-DHF), also known as hydrallostane or as allodihydrocortisol, is a metabolite of cortisol that is formed by 5α-reductase. It is present in the aqueous humor of the eye, is produced in the lens of the eye, and is involved in regulating the formation of the aqueous humor. 5α-DHF can be further metabolized into 3α,5α-tetrahydrocortisol by 3α-hydroxysteroid dehydrogenase.
