= Topical hydrocortisone =

Pharmaceutical drug

Clinical data
- Trade names: Ala-Cort, Aquanil HC, Beta HC, others
- Other names: Cortisol; 11β,17α,21-Trihydroxypregn-4-ene-3,20-dione
- AHFS/Drugs.com: Monograph
- MedlinePlus: a682793
- License data: US DailyMed: Hydrocortisone
- Pregnancy category: AU: A
- Routes of administration: Topical
- Drug class: Corticosteroid; Glucocorticoid; Mineralocorticoid
- ATC code: D07AA02 (WHO)

Legal status
- Legal status: AU: S4 (Prescription only) / S3 / S2; UK: POM (Prescription only) / P / GSL; US: OTC / Rx-only; EU: OTC / Rx-only

Identifiers
- IUPAC name: (8S,9S,10R,11S,13S,14S,17R)-11,17-Dihydroxy-17-(2-hydroxyacetyl)-10,13-dimethyl-2,6,7,8,9,11,12,14,15,16-decahydro-1H-cyclopenta[a]phenanthren-3-one
- CAS Number: 50-23-7
- PubChem CID: 5754
- DrugBank: DB00741
- ChemSpider: 5551
- UNII: WI4X0X7BPJ
- KEGG: D00088; D00165
- ChEBI: CHEBI:17650
- ChEMBL: ChEMBL389621

Chemical and physical data
- Formula: C_{21}H_{30}O_{5}
- Molar mass: 362.466 g·mol^{−1}
- 3D model (JSmol): Interactive image
- SMILES: O=C4\C=C2/[C@]([C@H]1[C@@H](O)C[C@@]3([C@@](O)(C(=O)CO)CC[C@H]3[C@@H]1CC2)C)(C)CC4
- InChI: InChI=1S/C21H30O5/c1-19-7-5-13(23)9-12(19)3-4-14-15-6-8-21(26,17(25)11-22)20(15,2)10-16(24)18(14)19/h9,14-16,18,22,24,26H,3-8,10-11H2,1-2H3/t14-,15-,16-,18+,19-,20-,21-/m0/s1; Key:JYGXADMDTFJGBT-VWUMJDOOSA-N

Topical hydrocortisone is a drug under the class of corticosteroids, which is used for the treatment of skin inflammation, itchiness and allergies. Some examples include insect bites, dermatitis and rash.

Hydrocortisone was discovered by Nobel laureates Edward C. Kendall and Philip S. Hench in the 1930s while they were conducting research on rheumatoid arthritis. Its topical use was first recorded in the 1950s.

The most common adverse effects after the application of topical hydrocortisone are burning and stinging sensations. Side effects after long-term usage include eyesight damage, elevated blood sugar levels and adrenal gland disorders.

Topical hydrocortisone is available in several dosage forms such as solution, lotion, cream, ointment and spray. Some brand names for topical hydrocortisone include Anusol HC, Cortizone 10, and Synacort.

== Medical uses ==
Topical hydrocortisone is indicated for relieving swelling, irritation and redness in a number of skin conditions, including insect bites, heat rash, eczema, psoriasis, contact dermatitis and nappy rash. It could be formulated as a single active ingredient in some medications, e.g. Cortaid, which is applied for anal itchiness. On some occasions, this drug may be used in combination with other types of drugs to alleviate skin problems. For example, it could be used together with antibiotics such as polymyxin, neomycin and bacitracin to improve dermal conditions.

== Adverse effects ==
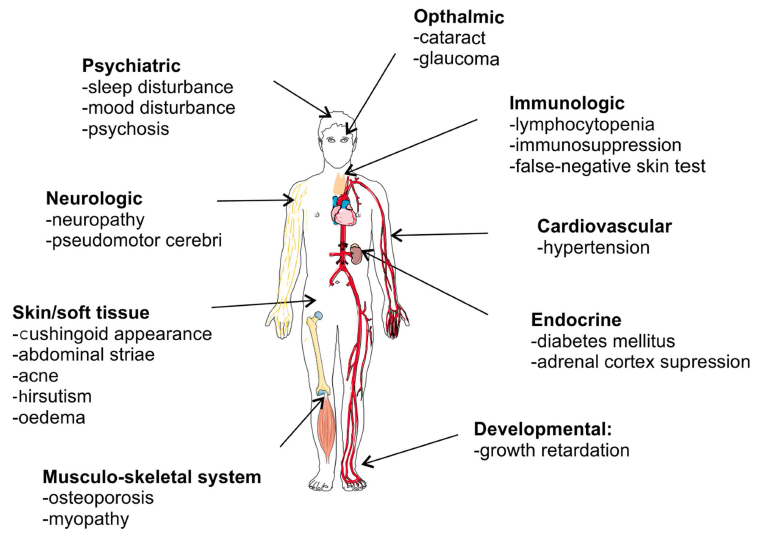
Possible adverse effects of topical hydrocortisone

Some common side effects include burning and stinging sensations. Colour change of the skin, bump formation on the skin and additional hair growth could also occur. It is recommended that a doctor be consulted if these side effects persist or become worse.

Some severe side effects are severe rash, swelling of the skin, and skin infection. Rare but serious allergic reactions, also known as anaphylaxis, can also occur. In the event that any of these side effects are encountered, patients are advised to approach a doctor immediately.

Adverse effects after a long-term use of topical hydrocortisone include adrenal gland disorders. This problem can be more severe when excess topical hydrocortisone are used for a prolonged period of time. Other adverse effects include blurry vision, dizziness, fainting, unusual heartbeat, thirsty sensation, frequent urination, and fatigue. It is recommended that a doctor be informed if any of these symptoms occur.

The impact of ingestion (eating) of such products has not been reported systematically, but a case report published in 2022 suggests this can lead to hospitalization and be potentially life threatening.

== Pharmacology ==
=== Pharmacodynamics ===
Hydrocortisone binds to glucocorticoid receptors in the human body, which, among other mechanisms and pathways, reduces the production of inflammatory transcription factors, phospholipase A2, and NF-kappa B. It also increases the expression of anti-inflammatory genes. In addition, hydrocortisone has a relatively wide therapeutic window, implying that toxicity is less likely to occur.

Topical hydrocortisone contributes to inflammatory-reducing activity in various ways. Firstly, hydrocortisone can bind to glucocorticoid receptors in the cytoplasm, causing alterations in the conformation of the receptors. This promotes the exchange and binding of proteins at the site of the receptors. The activated receptors then enter the nucleus to upregulate genes for reducing inflammation such as lipocortin. Next, lipocortin inhibits phospholipase A2, an enzyme preventing the synthesis of prostaglandins and lipoxygenases from arachidonic acid. After that, hydrocortisone stabilises the lysosomes in neutrophils, which are a type of white blood cell. Hence, the neutrophils would not degranulate, preventing inflammation. Eventually, mRNA segments are destabilized, affecting gene transcription and interrupting the gene production of cytokines, chemokines, cyclooxygenase-2, etc.

=== Pharmacokinetics ===
Topical hydrocortisone has minimal absorption into the body: Only 4-19% of the topical hydrocortisone cream applied would be absorbed into the human bloodstream. After a certain extent of absorption, it undergoes distribution, metabolism and elimination pathways that are similar to systemic hydrocortisone. Regarding the distribution of topical hydrocortisone, it binds to plasma proteins such as globulin and albumin, then the drug is mainly metabolized in the liver, and the metabolite will be excreted through bile or by kidneys.

== Chemistry ==
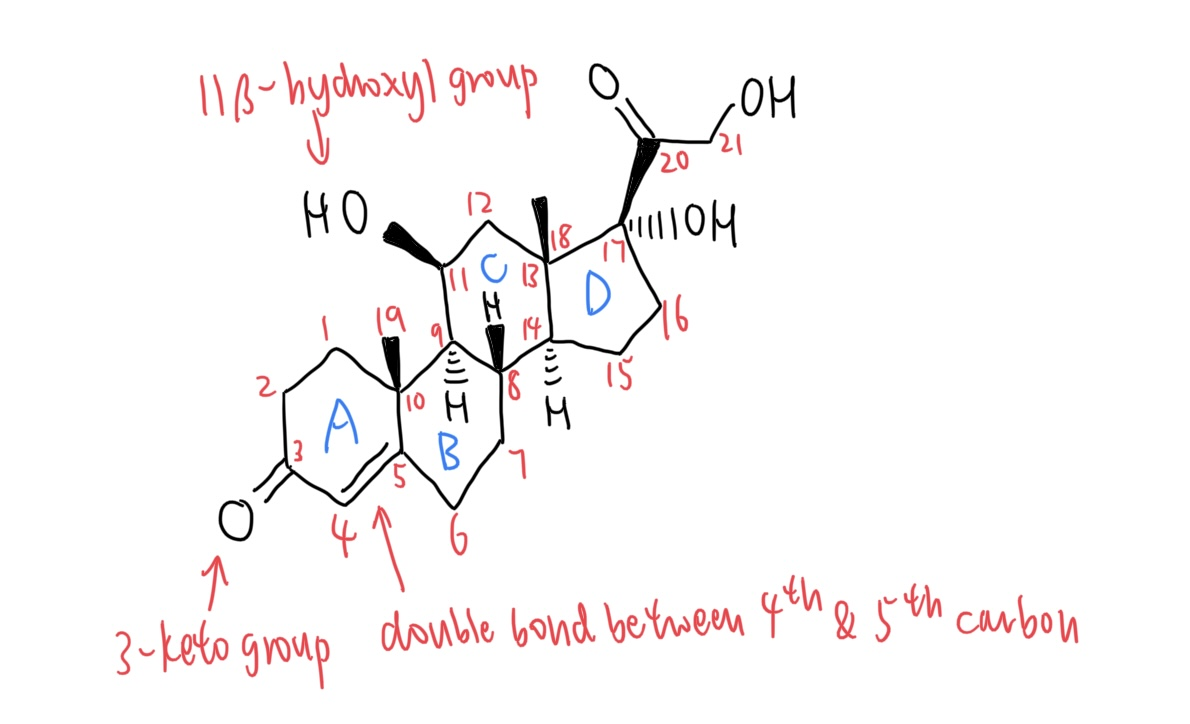
This is a chemical structure of hydrocortisone with markings of the functional groups that contribute to its glucocorticoid activity.

=== Structure-activity relationship ===
Hydrocortisone, or 17-hydroxycorticosterone, is under the class of glucocorticoids, which are steroids synthesized in the adrenal cortex of the kidneys. In order to illustrate its glucocorticoid activity, the A ring of hydrocortisone has a keto group in the 3rd carbon and a double bond between the 4th and 5th carbon. For the C ring of the compound, the 11th carbon has a beta hydroxyl substitution, which is also necessary for the drug to demonstrate glucocorticoid effects.

=== pKa ===
The estimated pKa values of hydrocortisone are 12.59 and -2.8 respectively.

=== Solubility ===
The log P value of hydrocortisone is 1.61, which was derived from experiments done by pharmacologist Corwin Hansch and his research team. In addition, the predicted water solubility of hydrocortisone is 0.199 mg/mL. These values indicate that hydrocortisone has a low solubility in water and is more soluble in organic solvents.

For other chemical information of topical hydrocortisone, please refer to the 'Topical hydrocortisone' table.

== Formulations ==
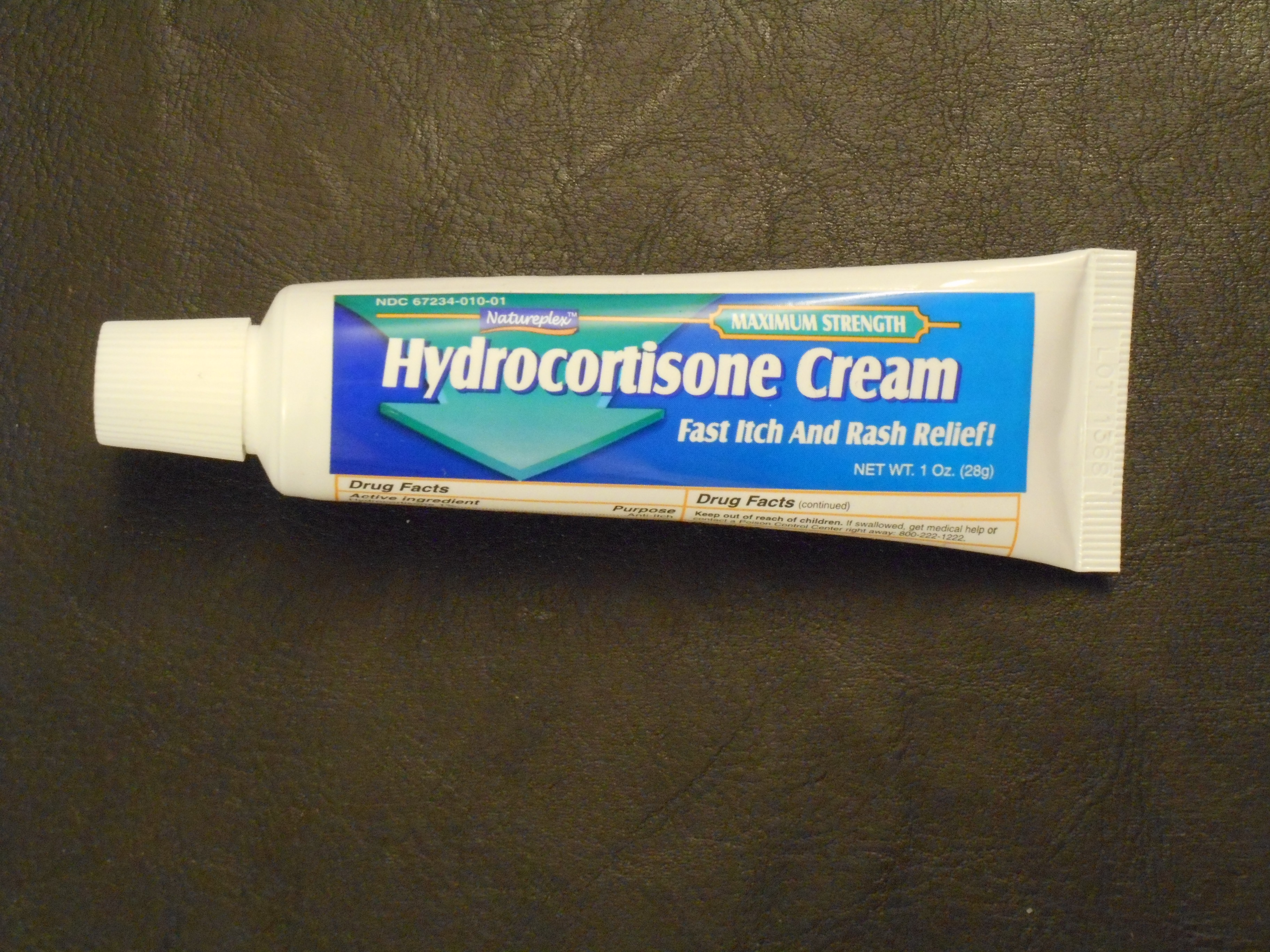
Topical hydrocortisone cream available in the United States

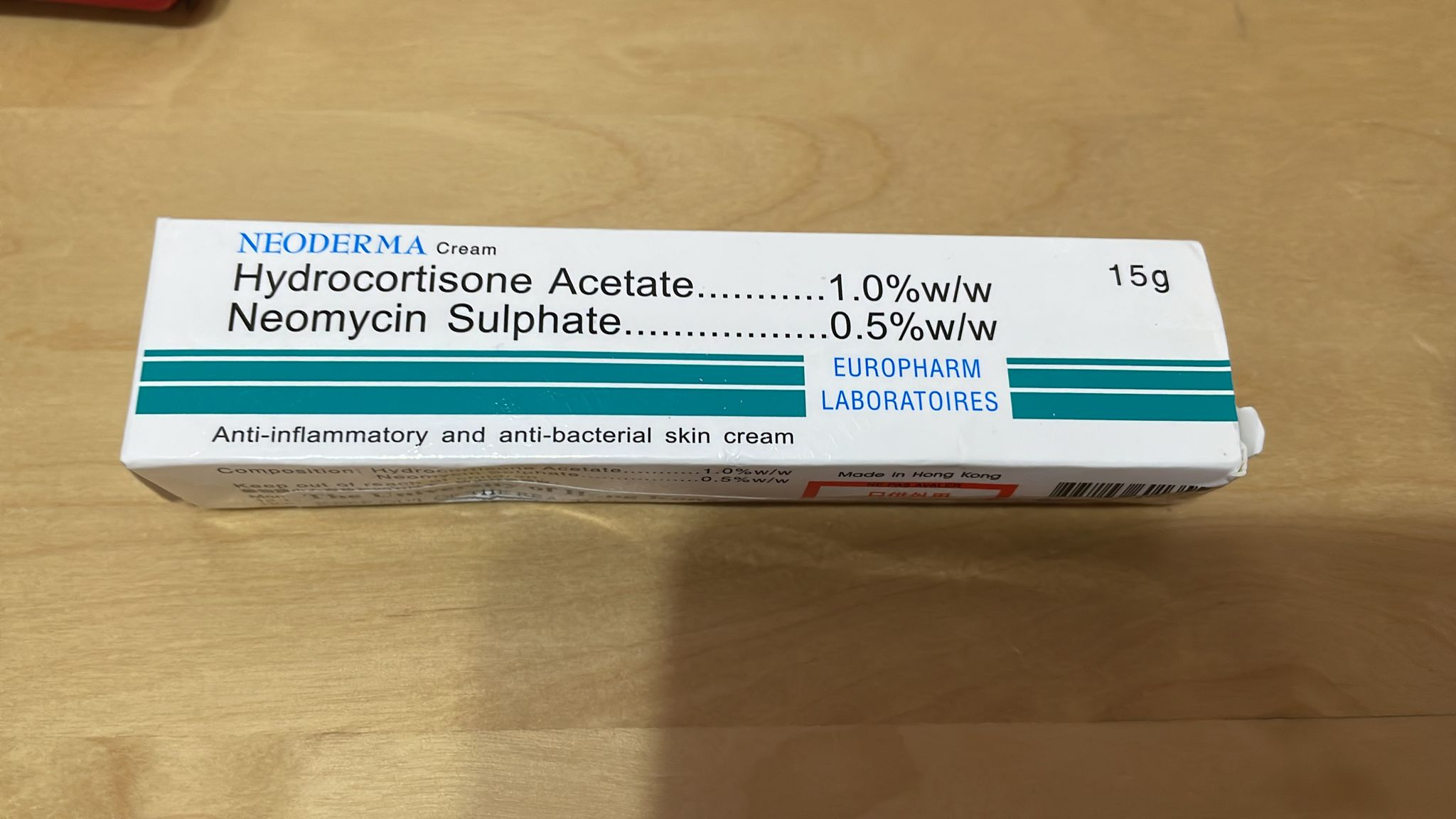
Topical hydrocortisone cream with neomycin available in Hong Kong

Topical hydrocortisone is formulated as liquid, solution, lotion, cream, gel, ointment, foam, and spray. The strength of topical hydrocortisone products ranges from 0.1% to 2.5%, which means there could be 1 mg to 25 mg hydrocortisone in 1g of the products. Some formulations for topical hydrocortisone include hydrocortisone 0.5% cream or ointment, hydrocortisone 1% cream or ointment, and hydrocortisone 2.5% cream or ointment. Regarding the method of applying the medications, please refer to the package insert or consult a pharmacist.

Some less common forms of topical hydrocortisone are also available in the market. For example, hydrocortisone butyrate is a relatively potent topical hydrocortisone cream that can only be purchased when you have a valid prescription. Besides, some forms of topical hydrocortisone are mixed with antimicrobial drugs to treat bacterial or fungal problems of the skin.

== History ==
In the 1930s, hydrocortisone was found by biochemist Edward C. Kendall and rheumatologist Philip S. Hench, who were both Nobel laureates. When they were investigating therapies for rheumatoid arthritis, they discovered that female patients of the disease would experience an alleviation of their condition if they were pregnant at the same time. It was also found that patients suffering from both rheumatoid arthritis and jaundice would have fewer symptoms associated with rheumatoid arthritis. Following this finding, they extracted different hormones from the adrenal cortex of cows in search of a suitable drug. They first identified cortisone to be one of the possible drugs, and further research led them to discover an effective drug for human dermal problems, which was hydrocortisone.

After the discovery of hydrocortisone, the earliest application of hydrocortisone as a topical form in humans was recorded in 1952. Its successful utilization facilitated more research on topical corticosteroids, which helped the development of similar drugs with higher activity.
