= Kahrizi syndrome =

Genetic disorder

Kahrizi syndrome (KHRZ) is an autosomal-recessive disease that is identified by intellectual disability, cataracts, coloboma, kyphosis, and coarse facial features caused by a homozygous mutation in the SRD5A3 gene.

== Signs and symptoms ==
Human traits related to Kahrizi syndrome are cataracts, wide nasal bridge, severe intellectual disability, motor delay, thick lower lip vermilion, capillary hemangioma, iris coloboma, bulbous nose, knee and elbow flexion contracture, and thoracic kyphosis.

Symptoms of Kahrizi Syndrome

- Head and Neck eyes:
  - Iris Coloboma
  - Cataracts
- Skeletal Spine:
  - Thoracic Kyphosis
- Head and Neck Mouth:
  - Thick Lips
- Skeletal:
  - Joint Contractures
- Head and Neck Nose:
  - Bulbous Nose
  - Broad Nasal Bridge
- Neurological Central Nervous System:
  - Delayed Motor Development
  - Severe Mental Retardation
  - Speech Never Acquired
- Skeletal Limbs:
  - Knee Contractures
- Skin Nails Hair Skin:
  - Capillary hemangioma

=== Clinical features ===
Three Iranian siblings born with syndrome characterized by severe intellectual disability, cataracts with onset in late adolescence, kyphosis, contracture of large joints, bulbous nose with broad nasal bridge, and thick lips. At age 8, all 3 siblings had developed severe thoracic kyphosis but after several skeletal X-rays revealed no vertebral abnormalities. One sibling had left iris coloboma, and another sibling had bilateral iris coloboma. The oldest brother had a large capillary hemangioma on the left cheek. At the time of the report, the siblings where 45,42, and 40 years old. At this age, none of the patients had learned to speak, and showed a late motor development. Both parents came from the same village in Iran and was assumed they were possibly related, but linkage could not be determined. Kahrizi syndrome could possibly be a cause of third-cousin genetic disorder. No studied have yet been proven.

== Phenotype and gene relationship ==
- Phenotype MIM number: 612713
- Inheritance: Autosomal Recessive
- Phenotype Mapping Key: 3
- Gene/Locus: SRD5A3
- Gene/Locus MIM number: 611715
