= Tetrahydrodeoxycorticosterone =

Chemical compound

Clinical data
- Other names: THDOC

Identifiers
- IUPAC name: (3α,5β)-3,21-dihydroxypregnan-20-one
- CAS Number: 567-03-3
- PubChem CID: 91475
- UNII: 4AB717DP4A
- ECHA InfoCard: 100.008.457

Chemical and physical data
- Formula: C_{21}H_{34}O_{3}
- Molar mass: 334.500 g·mol^{−1}
- 3D model (JSmol): Interactive image
- SMILES: C[C@]12CCC(C[C@H]1CC[C@@H]3[C@@H]2CC[C@]4([C@H]3CC[C@@H]4C(=O)CO)C)O

Tetrahydrodeoxycorticosterone (abbreviated as THDOC; 3α,21-dihydroxy-5α-pregnan-20-one), also referred to as allotetrahydrocorticosterone, is an endogenous neurosteroid. It is synthesized from the adrenal hormone deoxycorticosterone by the action of two enzymes, 5α-reductase type I and 3α-hydroxysteroid dehydrogenase. THDOC is a potent positive allosteric modulator of the GABA_{A} receptor, and has sedative, anxiolytic and anticonvulsant effects. Changes in the normal levels of this steroid particularly during pregnancy and menstruation may be involved in some types of epilepsy (catamenial epilepsy) and premenstrual syndrome, as well as stress, anxiety and depression.

== See also ==
- Allopregnanolone
- Dihydrodeoxycorticosterone (DHDOC)
- Tetrahydrocorticosterone (THB)
