= Tetrahydrocortisone =

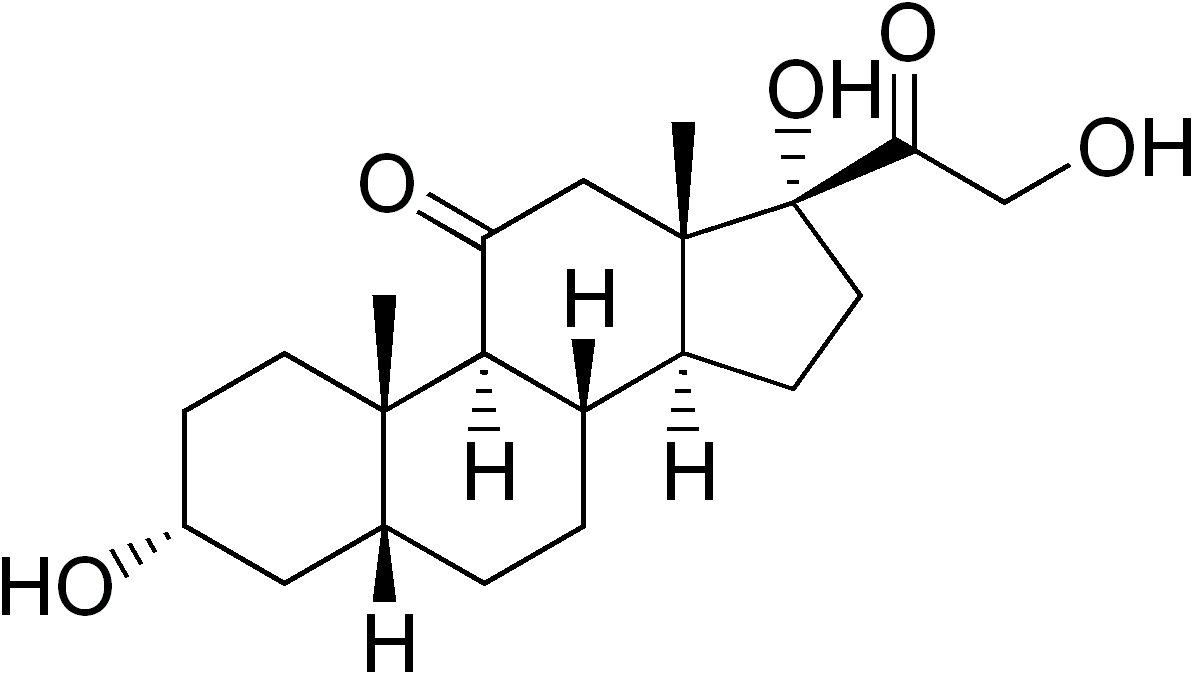

Names
- IUPAC name 3α,17,21-Trihydroxy-5β-pregnane-11,20-dione
- Systematic IUPAC name (1R,3aS,3bS,5aR,7R,9aS,9bS,11aS)-1,7-Dihydroxy-1-(hydroxyacetyl)-9a,11a-dimethylhexadecahydro-10H-cyclopenta[a]phenanthren-10-one
- Other names Urocortisone; 3α,5β-Tetrahydrocortisone

Identifiers
CAS Number	53-05-4
3D model (JSmol)	Interactive image
ChEMBL	ChEMBL1908043
ChemSpider	5657
ECHA InfoCard	100.000.148
PubChem CID	5866
UNII	5HF9TM2D15
CompTox Dashboard (EPA)	DTXSID70878591
- InChI: InChI=1S/C21H32O5/c1-19-7-5-13(23)9-12(19)3-4-14-15-6-8-21(26,17(25)11-22)20(15,2)10-16(24)18(14)19/h12-15,18,22-23,26H,3-11H2,1-2H3/t12-,13-,14+,15+,18-,19+,20+,21+/m1/s1 Key: SYGWGHVTLUBCEM-ZIZPXRJBSA-N; InChI=1/C21H32O5/c1-19-7-5-13(23)9-12(19)3-4-14-15-6-8-21(26,17(25)11-22)20(15,2)10-16(24)18(14)19/h12-15,18,22-23,26H,3-11H2,1-2H3/t12-,13-,14+,15+,18-,19+,20+,21+/m1/s1 Key: SYGWGHVTLUBCEM-ZIZPXRJBBU
- SMILES: O=C2[C@H]3[C@H]([C@@H]1CC[C@](O)(C(=O)CO)[C@@]1(C)C2)CC[C@@H]4C[C@H](O)CC[C@]34C

Properties
Chemical formula	C_{21}H_{32}O_{5}
Molar mass	364.48 g/mol
- Except where otherwise noted, data are given for materials in their standard state (at 25 °C [77 °F], 100 kPa). verify (what is ?) Infobox references

Tetrahydrocortisone, or urocortisone, also known as 3α,17α,21-trihydroxy-5β-pregnane-11,20-dione, is a steroid and an inactive metabolite of cortisone.

== See also ==
- Tetrahydrocortisol
- Tetrahydrocorticosterone
