= Dihydrodeoxycorticosterone =

Names
- IUPAC name 21-Hydroxy-5α-pregnane-3,20-dione
- Systematic IUPAC name (1S,3aS,3bR,5aS,9aS,9bS,11aS)-1-(Hydroxyacetyl)-9a,11a-dimethylhexadecahydro-7H-cyclopenta[a]phenanthren-7-one
- Other names 5α-Dihydro-11-deoxycorticosterone

Identifiers
CAS Number	298-36-2
3D model (JSmol)	Interactive image
ChEBI	CHEBI:81468
ChemSpider	4953958
PubChem CID	6451493
UNII	J7LXT59G72
CompTox Dashboard (EPA)	DTXSID40952236
- InChI: InChI=1S/C21H32O3/c1-20-9-7-14(23)11-13(20)3-4-15-16-5-6-18(19(24)12-22)21(16,2)10-8-17(15)20/h13,15-18,22H,3-12H2,1-2H3/t13-,15-,16-,17-,18+,20-,21-/m0/s1 Key: USPYDUPOCUYHQL-KVHKMPIWSA-N; InChI=1/C21H32O3/c1-20-9-7-14(23)11-13(20)3-4-15-16-5-6-18(19(24)12-22)21(16,2)10-8-17(15)20/h13,15-18,22H,3-12H2,1-2H3/t13-,15-,16-,17-,18+,20-,21-/m0/s1 Key: USPYDUPOCUYHQL-KVHKMPIWBY
- SMILES: C[C@]12CCC(=O)C[C@@H]1CC[C@@H]3[C@@H]2CC[C@]4([C@H]3CC[C@@H]4C(=O)CO)C

Properties
Chemical formula	C_{21}H_{32}O_{3}
Molar mass	332.484 g·mol^{−1}
- Except where otherwise noted, data are given for materials in their standard state (at 25 °C [77 °F], 100 kPa). Infobox references

5α-Dihydrodeoxycorticosterone (abbreviated as DHDOC), also known as 21-hydroxy-5α-pregnan-20-one, is an endogenous progestogen and neurosteroid. It is synthesized from the adrenal hormone deoxycorticosterone (DOC) by the enzyme 5α-reductase type I. DHDOC is an agonist of the progesterone receptor, as well as a positive allosteric modulator of the GABA_{A} receptor, and is known to have anticonvulsant effects.

== See also ==
- Tetrahydrodeoxycorticosterone (THDOC)
- 5α-Dihydroprogesterone (DHP)
- Hydroxydione
