= Glucocorticoid remediable aldosteronism =

- Other names: GRA
- Specialty: Endocrinology

Glucocorticoid remediable aldosteronism also describable as aldosterone synthase hyperactivity, is an autosomal dominant disorder in which the increase in aldosterone secretion produced by ACTH is no longer transient.

It is a cause of primary hyperaldosteronism.

== Symptoms and signs ==
Patients with GRA may be asymptomatic, but the following symptoms can be present:

- Fatigue
- Headache
- High blood pressure
- Hypokalemia
- Intermittent or temporary paralysis
- Muscle spasms
- Muscle weakness
- Numbness
- Polyuria
- Polydipsia
- Tingling
- Hypernatraemia
- Metabolic alkalosis

== Normal Physiology ==
Steroidogenesis, showing aldosterone synthase at right.

Aldosterone synthase is a steroid hydroxylase cytochrome P450 oxidase enzyme involved in the generation of aldosterone. It is localized to the mitochondrial inner membrane. The enzyme has steroid 18-hydroxylase activity to synthesize aldosterone and other steroids. Aldosterone synthase is found within the zona glomerulosa at the outer edge of the adrenal cortex. Aldosterone synthase normally is not ACTH sensitive, and is only activated by angiotensin II.

Aldosterone causes the tubules of the kidneys to retain sodium and water. This increases the volume of fluid in the body and drives up blood pressure.

Steroid hormones are synthesized from cholesterol within the adrenal cortex. Aldosterone and corticosterone share the first part of their biosynthetic pathway. The last part is either mediated by the aldosterone synthase (for aldosterone) or by the 11β-hydroxylase (for corticosterone).

Aldosterone synthesis is stimulated by several factors:

by increase in the plasma concentration of angiotensin III.
by increased plasma angiotensin II, ACTH, or potassium levels.
The ACTH stimulation test is sometimes used to stimulate the production of aldosterone along with cortisol to determine if primary or secondary adrenal insufficiency is present.
by plasma acidosis.
by the stretch receptors located in the atria of the heart.
by adrenoglomerulotropin, a lipid factor, obtained from pineal extracts. It selectively stimulates secretion of aldosterone.
The secretion of aldosterone has a diurnal rhythm.

Control of aldosterone release from the adrenal cortex:

- The role of the renin–angiotensin system:

Angiotensin is involved in regulating aldosterone and is the core regulator. Angiotensin II acts synergistically with potassium.

- The role of sympathetic nerves:

Aldosterone production is also affected to one extent or another by nervous control which integrates the inverse of carotid artery pressure, pain, posture, and probably emotion (anxiety, fear, and hostility)(including surgical stress).

- The role of baroreceptors:

Pressure in the carotid artery decreases aldosterone

- The role of the juxtaglomerular apparatus
- The plasma concentration of potassium:

The amount of aldosterone secreted is a direct function of the serum potassium as probably determined by sensors in the carotid artery.

- The plasma concentration of sodium:

Aldosterone is a function of the inverse of the sodium intake as sensed via osmotic pressure.

- Miscellaneous regulation:

ACTH, a pituitary peptide, also has some stimulating effect on aldosterone probably by stimulating deoxycorticosterone formation which is a precursor of aldosterone.
Aldosterone is increased by blood loss, pregnancy, and possibly by other circumstances such as physical exertion, endotoxin shock, and burns.

Aldosterone feedback:

Feedback by aldosterone concentration itself is of a non-morphological character (that is, other than changes in cell number or structure) and is relatively poor so that electrolyte feedback predominates in the short term.

== Pathophysiology ==
The genes encoding aldosterone synthase and 11β-hydroxylase are 95% identical and are close together on chromosome 8. In individuals with GRA, there is unequal crossing over so that the 5' regulatory region of the 11-hydroxylase gene is fused to the coding region of the aldosterone synthase.

The product of this hybrid gene is aldosterone synthase that is ACTH-sensitive in the zona fasciculata of the adrenal gland.

Although in normal subjects, ACTH accelerates the first step of aldosterone synthesis, ACTH normally has no effect on the activity of aldosterone synthase. However, in subjects with glucocorticoid-remediable aldosteronism, ACTH increases the activity of existing aldosterone synthase, resulting in an abnormally high rate of aldosterone synthesis and hyperaldosteronism.

== Diagnosis ==
Genetic testing is done to ascertain that the individual in question does indeed have the condition

== Treatment ==
In GRA, the hypersecretion of aldosterone and the accompanying hypertension are remedied when ACTH secretion is suppressed by administering glucocorticoids. Dexamethasone, spironolactone and eplerenone have been used in treatment.

== See also ==
- Inborn errors of steroid metabolism
- Hyperaldosteronism
- Pseudohyperaldosteronism
- Apparent mineralocorticoid excess syndrome
- Aldosterone and aldosterone synthase
