= Adrenocortical hormone =

Hormones produced by the adrenal cortex

In humans and other animals, the adrenocortical hormones are hormones produced by the adrenal cortex, the outer region of the adrenal gland. These polycyclic steroid hormones have a variety of roles that are crucial for the body's response to stress (for example, the fight-or-flight response), and they also regulate other functions in the body. Threats to homeostasis, such as injury, chemical imbalances, infection, or psychological stress, can initiate a stress response. Examples of adrenocortical hormones that are involved in the stress response are aldosterone and cortisol. These hormones also function in regulating the conservation of water by the kidneys and glucose metabolism, respectively.

== Classes ==
Adrenocortical hormones are divided into three classes by function: mineralocorticoids, glucocorticoids, and androgens.

1. Mineralocorticoid hormones are synthesized in the outermost layer of the adrenal cortex known as the zona glomerulosa. Their function is to regulate the concentration of electrolytes circulating in the blood. For example, aldosterone functions to raise blood sodium levels and lower blood potassium levels by targeting the kidneys. Specifically, it binds receptors of cells that comprise the distal tubules of the kidneys which then stimulate ion channels to conserve sodium and excrete potassium. Additionally, the ion gradient initiates conservation of water.
2. The glucocorticoid family of hormones is synthesized in the middle layer of the adrenal cortex known as the zona fasciculata. These hormones regulate the processing of proteins, fats, and carbohydrates by the human body. They also play a role in maintaining a normal stress response cycle.
3. Androgens, or sex hormones, are synthesized in the innermost layer of the adrenal cortex known as the zona reticularis. These hormones, such as estrogen in females and testosterone in males, are commonly known for promoting sexual characteristics and the maturation of reproductive organs of the respective gender.

== Structure ==
Adrenocortical hormones are considered steroid hormones because of the shared characteristic of a cholesterol backbone. The structures of different steroids differ by the types and locations of additional atoms on a cholesterol backbone. The cholesterol backbone consists of four hydrocarbon rings, three cyclohexane rings and one cyclopentane, that contribute to its insolubility in aqueous environments. However, the hydrophobic nature allows them to readily diffuse through the plasma membrane of cells. This is important to the function of steroid hormones as they rely on cellular response pathways to restore the homeostatic imbalance that initiated the hormone release.

== Synthesis ==
The synthesis of adrenocortical steroid hormones involves a chain of oxidation-reduction reactions catalyzed by a series of enzymes. Synthesis begins with a molecule of cholesterol. Through shared intermediates and pathways branching off those shared intermediates, the different classes of steroids are synthesized. Steroids are synthesized from cholesterol in their respective regions of the adrenal cortex. The process is controlled by steroidogenic acute regulatory protein (StAR) which sits in the mitochondrial membrane and regulates the passage of cholesterol. This is the rate-limiting step of steroid biosynthesis. Once StAR has transported cholesterol into the mitochondria, the cholesterol molecule undergoes a string of oxidation-reduction reactions catalyzed by a series of enzymes from the family of cytochrome P450 enzymes. A coenzyme system called adrenodoxin reductase transfers electrons to the P450 enzyme which initiates the oxidation-reduction reactions that transform cholesterol into the steroid hormones. Though synthesis is initiated inside mitochondria, precursors are shuttled to the endoplasmic reticulum for processing by enzymes present in the endoplasmic reticulum. The precursors are shuttled back to the mitochondria in the region of the adrenal cortex within which synthesis initially began and it is there that synthesis is completed.

== Pathology ==
=== Cushing's Syndrome ===
Cushing's syndrome arises from the repeated hypersecretion of glucocorticoids. It can be caused by either an adrenal tumor or by hypersecretion of adrenocorticotropic hormone (ACTH) from the anterior pituitary gland. It is predominantly due to an excess of the glucocorticoid cortisol. Secretion is typically regulated by the hypothalamus which secretes corticotropin-releasing hormone (CRH) to the pituitary gland, stimulating the pituitary to secrete adrenocorticotropic hormone (ACTH). ACTH then travels to the adrenal glands and induces the release of cortisol into the bloodstream. In Cushing's syndrome, this process occurs in excess. Some symptoms of an individual with Cushing's syndrome include low tissue protein levels, due to muscle and bone atrophy, and high blood glucose levels. Sodium levels also see an increase which results in fluid retention in tissues and elevated blood pressure. In addition to hypersecretion of cortisol, excess androgens are secreted. In females, increased secretion of androgens, such as testosterone, results in masculinization which may present as facial hair growth and a deepened voice.

Treatment for Cushing's syndrome aims to reduce the high levels of cortisol circulating through the human body. The course of action ultimately depends on the cause of the hypersecretion. Cushing's can be induced by repeated synthetic steroid use to treat inflammatory diseases, or it can also be caused by a tumor in the pituitary gland or adrenal gland. In either case, treatment may rely on removal of the tumor or of the adrenal glands. Without the adrenal glands, the human body is unable to supply the hormones it produces and therefore requires hormone replacement therapy.

=== Addison's Disease ===
Addison's disease is an autoimmune disorder that affects the adrenal cortex such that it is unable to efficiently secrete hormones. The immune system specifically targets the cells of the adrenal cortex and destroys them, but Addison's disease can also be caused by a severe infection such as tuberculosis. Some symptoms include hypoglycemia and decreased blood sodium levels and increased blood potassium levels caused by a deficiency of aldosterone. These electrolyte imbalances induce nerve and muscle issues. Other symptoms include fatigue, salt cravings, weight loss, and increased skin pigmentation. Increased skin pigmentation is caused by a deficiency of the adrenocortical hormone hydrocortisone. Its normal behavior would be as negative feedback at the pituitary gland, stimulating the pituitary gland to decrease secretion of corticotropin. Because hydrocortisone is not able to be produced in Addison's disease, the pituitary gland continues to secrete corticotropin which binds to the receptor for melanocyte-stimulating hormone. It then causes melanocytes to produce more pigment, thus darkening the skin tone.

The standard treatment for Addison's disease is hormone replacement therapy for the mineralocorticoids and glucocorticoids that are no longer able to be synthesized.[12] Former U.S. President John F. Kennedy is a well-known individual who suffered from Addison's disease throughout his presidency. Due to the availability of hormone replacement therapy, he and his staff were able to cover up his condition.

== Stress and immunity ==
Recent studies have discovered a pathway that links stress to the onset of disease through the activation of certain genes. The experience of psychological stress activates transcription factors that activate genes. In a study by Cole et al., it was concluded that GABA-1 transcription factor activates the interleukin-6-gene. This gene codes for a protein that activates the inflammatory response which directs an immune response to the site of the inflammation. Chronic inflammation makes an individual more susceptible to diseases such as cancer, heart disease, and diabetes.

Another study found that physical stress caused increased cortisol:DHEAS (dehydroepiandrosterone sulphate) molar ratios which may contribute to reduced immunity, especially in the elderly for whom cortisol:DHEAS ratios are already increased. This is because DHEAS levels decrease with age while cortisol levels do not. This high ratio was found to suppress the activity of neutrophils and raise susceptibility for infection.
