= Apparent mineralocorticoid excess syndrome =

- Other names: AME, 11-beta-hydroxysteroid dehydrogenase deficiency type 2, Ulick syndrome.
- Apparent mineralocorticoid excess syndrome has an autosomal recessive pattern of inheritance
- Specialty: Medical genetics, endocrinology
- Symptoms: Hypertension, hypokalemia, metabolic alkalosis, and low plasma renin activity.

Apparent mineralocorticoid excess syndrome (AME) is an autosomal recessive disorder causing hypertension (high blood pressure), hypernatremia (increased blood sodium concentration) and hypokalemia (decreased blood potassium concentration). It results from mutations in the HSD11B2 gene, which encodes the kidney isozyme of 11β-hydroxysteroid dehydrogenase type 2. In an unaffected individual, this isozyme inactivates circulating cortisol to the less active metabolite cortisone. Liquorice consumption can also inhibit the enzyme and cause AME.

The inactivating mutation leads to elevated local concentrations of cortisol in the aldosterone sensitive tissues like the kidney. Cortisol at high concentrations can cross-react and activate the mineralocorticoid receptor due to the non-selectivity of the receptor, leading to aldosterone-like effects in the kidney. This is what causes the hypokalemia, hypertension, and hypernatremia associated with the syndrome. Patients often present with severe hypertension and end-organ changes associated with it like left ventricular hypertrophy, retinal, renal and neurological vascular changes along with growth retardation and failure to thrive. In serum both aldosterone and renin levels are low.

== Signs and symptoms ==
This disorder presents similarly to hyperaldosteronism, leading to feedback inhibition of aldosterone. Common symptoms include hypertension, hypokalemia, metabolic alkalosis, and low plasma renin activity.

DOC excess syndrome is an excessive secretion of 21-hydroxyprogesterone also called 11-Deoxycorticosterone from adrenal glands and may cause mineralocorticoid hypertension.

== Genetics ==
AME is inherited in an autosomal recessive manner. This means the defective gene responsible for the disorder is located on an autosome, and two copies of the defective gene (one inherited from each parent) are required in order to be born with the disorder. The parents of an individual with an autosomal recessive disorder both carry one copy of the defective gene, but usually do not experience any signs or symptoms of the disorder.

== Diagnosis ==
Other conditions such as Liddle's syndrome can mimic the clinical features of AME, so diagnosis can be made by calculating the ratio of free urinary cortisol to free urinary cortisone. Since AME patients create less cortisone, the ratio will much be higher than non-affected patients. Alternatively, one could differentiate between the two syndromes by administering a potassium-sparing diuretic. Patients with Liddle's syndrome will only respond to a diuretic that binds the ENaC channel, whereas those with AME will respond to a diuretic that binds to ENaC or the mineralcorticoid receptor.

== Treatment ==
The treatment for AME is based on the blood pressure control with an aldosterone antagonist like spironolactone which also reverses the hypokalemic metabolic alkalosis and other anti-hypertensives. A renal transplant is found curative in almost all clinical cases. AME is exceedingly rare, with fewer than 100 cases recorded worldwide.

== History ==
The clinical symptoms of AME were first reported in 1974 by a Professor from Switzerland; Edmond A Werder in a 3-year-old girl with low birth weight, delayed growth, polydipsia, polyuria, and hypertension. Stanley Ulick in New York studied a similar patient in 1964, finding a low aldosterone secretory rate but increased secretion of 18-hydroxycorticosterone. This experiment called “isotopic dilution”, and it is conducted by measuring the radioactivity of urinary metabolites after injecting a known amount of radiolabeled aldosterone. Based in his and other works, Ulick proposed that 2 distinct enzymes act in succession on corticosterone. Ulick observed that 18-hydroxycorticosterone was converted to aldosterone much less well than corticosterone when added to adrenal slices, hence the possibility that corticosterone is converted to aldosterone by a single enzyme through an enzyme-bound intermediate was postulated by Ulick.. Later, a young native American girl was referred to the Dr. Ulick’s young pediatric endocrinologist Dr. Maria New. The girl was extremely hypertensive, despite very low levels of renin and aldosterone. Dr. Maria New also identified patients with similar symptoms, characterized their biochemical profiles. Over the months in New York, the young girl was extensively investigated by both Dr. New and the late Dr. Stanley Ulick to determine the cause of her condition. They sent blood and urine samples to the late John Baxter in San Francisco, and other eminent center in Melbourne, the later replied: "neither of us could find anything that would fill the bill"..The description of the syndrome was published in 1977, and the first coinage of “Apparent Mineralocorticoid Excess” used in a second paper in 1979. Indeed, the syndrome was initially known as "Ulick syndrome" in honor of researcher Ulick, who pioneered studies into the pathogenesis of this condition. Dr. Maria New later named the disease “Apparent Mineralocorticoid Excess” (AME). Initially, it was speculated that HSD11B1 (encoding 11β-hydroxysteroid dehydrogenase type 1 [11β-HSD1]) was the causative gene but no mutation was detected in AME patients; thus, the focus was shifted to other candidate genes. In 1995, the US Professor Robert Wilson identified the first HSD11B2 mutation in several siblings with typical characteristics of AME from a consanguineous Iranian family, unraveling the genetic defects of AME. The molecular pathogenesis of AME primarily results from a deficiency in the enzyme 11β-hydroxysteroid dehydrogenase type 2 (11β-HSD2), which is involved in the peripheral metabolism of cortisol. The distinguished Australian endocrine professor John Funder was described the full pathophysiology of the condition in 1995. For the last 50 years, Prof Funder’s research has been focused on aldosterone, the salt-retaining (mineralocorticoid) hormone, and the role of the mineralocorticoid receptor in organs such as the kidney..In 1999, B. Scott Nunez; another US professor, summarized the AME genotype–phenotype correlation by studying 14 affected children and proposed that clinical and/or biochemical parameters and enzyme activity were closely related.

== Liquorice effect ==
Liquorice consumption may also cause a temporary form of AME due to its ability to block 11β-hydroxysteroid dehydrogenase type 2, in turn causing increased levels of cortisol. Cessation of licorice consumption will reverse this form of AME.

== See also ==
- Inborn errors of steroid metabolism
- 11β-Hydroxylase I deficiency
- Hyperaldosteronism
- Pseudohyperaldosteronism
- Glucocorticoid-remediable aldosteronism
- Aldosterone and aldosterone synthase
- Maria New
