= Pseudohyperaldosteronism =

- Other names: Pseudoaldosteronism

Pseudohyperaldosteronism (also pseudoaldosteronism) is a medical condition which mimics the effects of elevated aldosterone (hyperaldosteronism) by presenting with high blood pressure, low blood potassium levels (hypokalemia), metabolic alkalosis, and low levels of plasma renin activity (PRA). However, unlike hyperaldosteronism, this conditions exhibits low or normal levels of aldosterone in the blood. Causes include genetic disorders (e.g. apparent mineralocorticoid excess syndrome, Liddle's syndrome, and types of congenital adrenal hyperplasia), acquired conditions (e.g. Cushing's syndrome and mineralocorticoid-producing adrenal tumors), metabolic disorders, and dietary imbalances including excessive consumption of licorice. Confirmatory diagnosis depends on the specific cause and may involve blood tests, urine tests, or genetic testing; however, all forms of this condition exhibit abnormally low concentrations of both plasma renin activity (PRA) and plasma aldosterone concentration (PAC) which differentiates this group of conditions from other forms of secondary hypertension. Treatment is tailored to the specific cause and focuses on symptom control, blood pressure management, and avoidance of triggers.

== Presentation ==
The presentation of pseudohyperaldosteronism varies depending on the cause. The genetic conditions such as Liddle's syndrome and congenital adrenal hyperplasia present in childhood or earlier in life than the acquired causes which can present at any age. Adult patients present with clinical history of resistant hypertension despite typical medical therapy and lifestyle changes. Hypertension itself is most often asymptomatic. Symptoms of hypokalemia include fatigue, muscular weakness, and increased urine production.

== Causes ==
This condition has several known causes including genetic disorders, acquired conditions, metabolic derangements, and dietary imbalances. All causes mimic the effects of elevated aldosterone without raising aldosterone levels but achieve this through varying mechanisms.

=== Genetic forms ===
Genetic disorders that lead to this condition include Liddle's syndrome, apparent mineralocorticoid excess (AME), and two types of congenital adrenal hyperplasia (CAH).

- Liddle's syndrome is autosomal dominant disorder affecting epithelial sodium channels (ENaC) in the distal tubules of the kidneys. In this disorder, a gain of function mutation decreases ENaC degradation leading to increased renal absorption of sodium and water.
- Apparent mineralocorticoid excess genetic forms include autosomal recessive disorders with mutations lowering the activity of the enzyme 11-beta-hydroxysteroid dehydrogenase type 2 (11-β-HSD2). These mutations limit the ability of 11-β-HSD2 to transform active cortisol to the less active cortisone. Excess cortisol is then able to bind and activate mineralocorticoid receptors due to receptor cross-reactivity leading to aldosterone-like effects.
- Congenital adrenal hyperplasia is an autosomal recessive disorder with multiple types, two of which lead to pseudohyperaldosteronism. Deficiency of 11-beta-hydroxylase blocks the conversion of 11-deoxycorticosterone (DOC) to corticosterone leading to an excess of DOC which acts as a mineralocorticoid similar to aldosterone. Deficiency of 17-alpha-hydroxylase blocks the conversion of pregnenolone and progesterone to their 17-a-hydroxy forms leading to increased mineralocorticoid production.

=== Acquired forms ===
Some causes of pseudohyperaldosteronism can be acquired throughout life with examples including adrenal tumors and ectopic ACTH syndrome.

- Adrenal tumor subtypes include adrenal adenomas that produce 11-deoxycorticosterone (DOC) leading to increased mineralocorticoid activity without elevated aldosterone.
- Ectopic ACTH syndrome describes conditions leading to excess production of adrenocorticotropic hormone (ACTH) subsequently leading to mineralocorticoid production. This can arise in ectopic forms of Cushing's syndrome associated with small-cell lung cancers and other ACTH-producing tumors. The excess ACTH can saturate the 11-β-HSD2 enzyme leading to decreased conversion of cortisol to cortisone and increased mineralocorticoid effects.

=== Metabolic and dietary forms ===
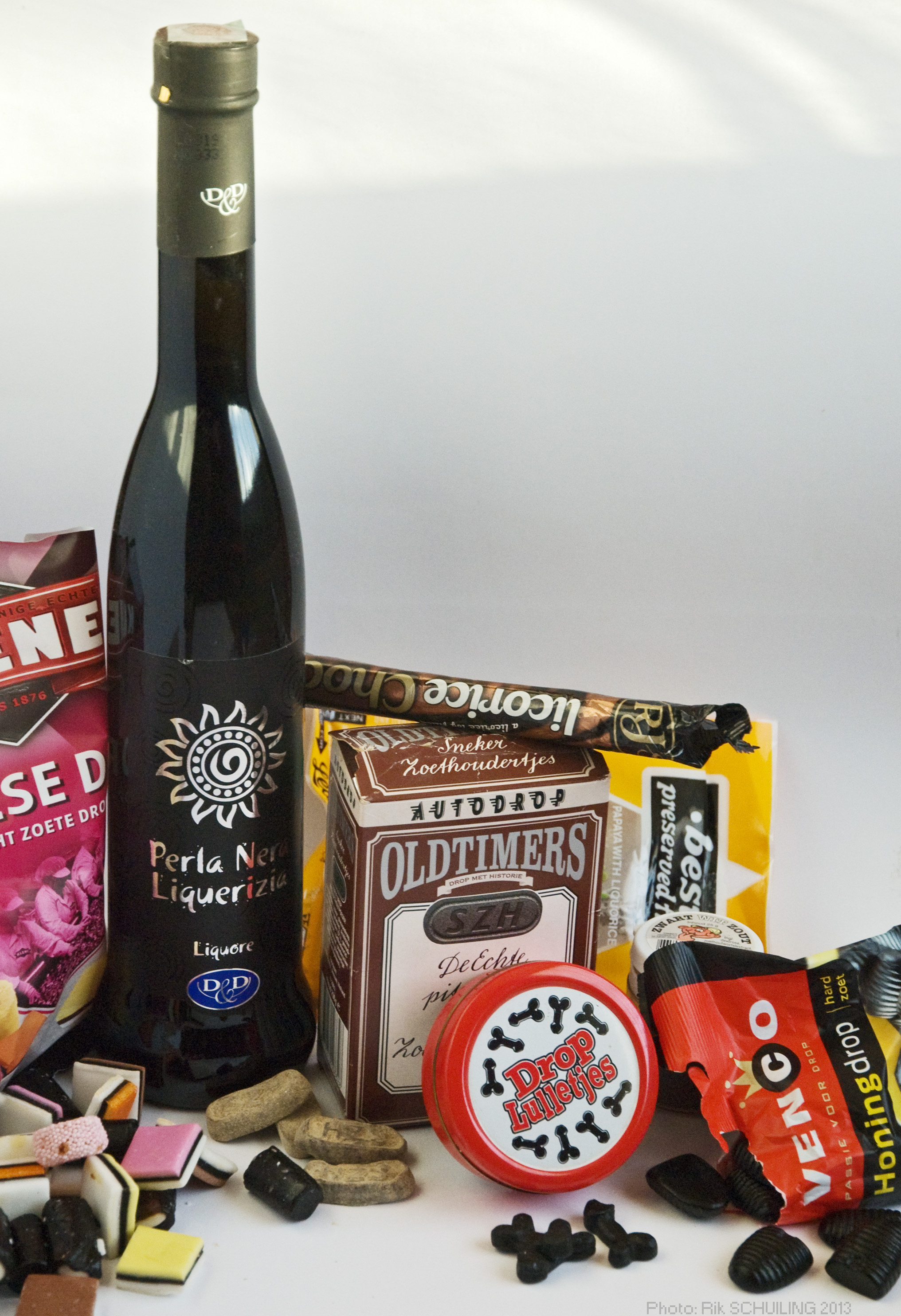
Various edible products containing licorice. Excessive consumption of licorice can lead to pseudohyperaldosteronism due to the plant's high concentrations of Glycyrrhetinic acid.

Metabolic causes include conditions of glucocorticoid resistance and from mineralocorticoid excess which can occur following high-dose corticosteroid therapy. Dietary causes include overconsumption of licorice-containing products. Glycyrrhetinic acid in licorice inhibits the 11-β-HSD2 enzyme resulting in inappropriate stimulation of the mineralocorticoid receptor by cortisol leading to aldosterone-like effects.

== Diagnosis ==
In patients with hypertension, diagnostic clues pointing to pseudohyperaldosteronism can be found on routine labwork. These include low serum potassium (hypokalemia), elevated serum sodium (hypernatremia), and elevated serum bicarbonate (metabolic alkalosis). Urine studies may show elevated urine potassium (kaliuresis). To further differentiate between hyperaldosteronism and pseudohyperaldosteronism, studies including plasma renin activity (PRA) and plasma aldosterone concentration (PAC) can be obtained. Pseudohyperaldosteronism will exhibit low levels of both PRA and PAC while hyperaldosteronism will demonstrate elevated PAC. Confirmatory tests to diagnose the specific forms of pseudohyperaldosteronism vary depending on the cause. The genetic conditions such as Liddle's syndrome and CAH can be confirmed with genetic tests for the affected genes. CAH can also be confirmed by analyzing enzyme levels following ACTH stimulation testing. AME can be diagnosed with a 24 hour urine collection exhibiting an increased ratio of urinary cortisol to urinary cortisone.

== Treatment ==
Specific treatment of pseudohyperaldosteronism depends on the inciting cause. General management focuses on countering the effects of excess mineralocorticoid activity to achieve adequate blood pressure control and avoid end-organ damage and cardiovascular mortality. In some cases, specific antihypertensive medications may be recommended. In Liddle's syndrome, ENaC-binding potassium-sparing diuretics (e.g. amiloride or triamterene) are used to counter the excess ENaC activity. In AME, the mineralocorticoid receptor-binding potassium-sparing diuretics (e.g. spironolactone or eplerenone) are used to limit aldosterone receptor activity. Other medications such as glucocorticoids are added in AME and CAH to inhibit ACTH and further cortisol production. Lifestyle changes such as a low sodium diet are also used for managing hypertension, and cessation of licorice intake is recommended in cases of licorice overconsumption.

== See also ==
- Primary aldosteronism
- Secondary hypertension
