= Steroid 11β-hydroxylase =

Protein found in mammals

CYP11B1

Identifiers
- Aliases: CYP11B1, CPN1, CYP11B, FHI, P450C11, cytochrome P450 family 11 subfamily B member 1
- External IDs: OMIM: 610613; MGI: 88584; GeneCards: CYP11B1
Enzyme activity
EC #	BRENDA	ExPASy	KEGG	MetaCyc
1.14.15.4	↗	↗	↗	↗

Gene location (Human)
Chr.	Chromosome 8 (human)
Band	8q24.3	Start	142,872,356 bp
Band	8q24.3	End	142,879,846 bp

Gene location (Mouse)
Chr.	Chromosome 15 (mouse)
Band	15 D3|15 34.29 cM	Start	74,722,859 bp
Band	15 D3|15 34.29 cM	End	74,728,167 bp
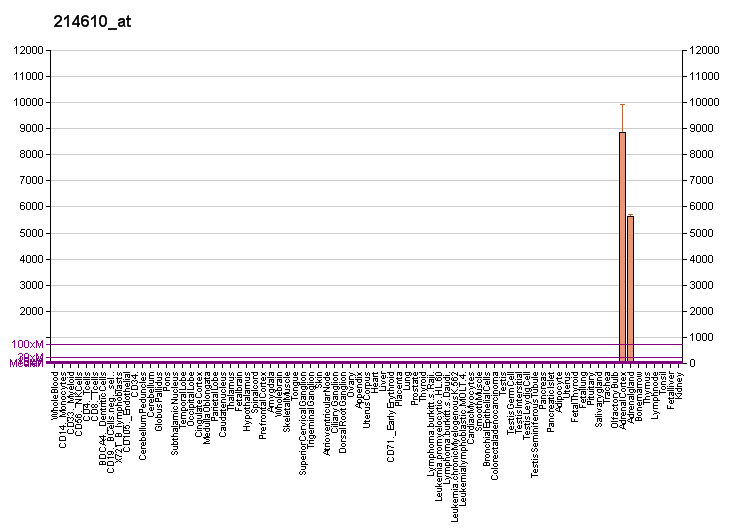
RNA expression pattern
Bgee	Human / Mouse (ortholog); Top expressed in: right adrenal cortex; left adrenal gland; left adrenal cortex; testicle; pancreatic ductal cell; right testis; right coronary artery; left testis; metanephros; ectocervix / Top expressed in: adrenal gland; lumbar subsegment of spinal cord; lumbar spinal ganglion; vastus lateralis muscle; spermatid; carotid body; gastrula; thoracic diaphragm; triceps brachii muscle; sternocleidomastoid muscle; More reference expression data
BioGPS	More reference expression data
Gene ontology
Molecular function	iron ion binding; corticosterone 18-monooxygenase activity; metal ion binding; monooxygenase activity; oxidoreductase activity, acting on paired donors, with incorporation or reduction of molecular oxygen; oxidoreductase activity; steroid 11-beta-monooxygenase activity; heme binding
Cellular component	membrane; mitochondrial membranes; mitochondrion; mitochondrial inner membrane
Biological process	glucose homeostasis; lipid metabolism; aldosterone biosynthetic process; cortisol biosynthetic process; regulation of blood pressure; C21-steroid hormone biosynthetic process; cellular response to hormone stimulus; glucocorticoid biosynthetic process; immune response; sterol metabolic process; cellular response to potassium ion; steroid biosynthetic process; steroid metabolic process; cholesterol metabolic process; cellular response to peptide hormone stimulus; cortisol metabolic process
Sources:Amigo / QuickGO
Orthologs
Databases	NCBI: entry; OMA: entry
Species	Human	Mouse
Entrez	1584	13072
Ensembl	ENSG00000160882	ENSMUSG00000022589
UniProt	P15538	P15539
RefSeq (mRNA)	NM_000497; NM_001026213	NM_009991
RefSeq (protein)	NP_000488; NP_001021384	NP_034121
Location (UCSC)	Chr 8: 142.87 – 142.88 Mb	Chr 15: 74.72 – 74.73 Mb
PubMed search
- Wikidata
View/Edit Human	View/Edit Mouse

steroid 11β-monooxygenase

Identifiers
- EC no.: 1.14.15.4
- CAS no.: 9029-66-7

Databases
- BRENDA: enzyme data
- ExPASy: NiceZyme view
- KEGG: enzyme entry
- MetaCyc: metabolic pathway
- Rhea: reactions
- PDB structures: RCSB PDB PDBe PDBsum
- Gene Ontology: AmiGO / QuickGO
Search
- PMC: articles
- PubMed: articles
- NCBI: proteins

Steroid 11β-hydroxylase, also known as steroid 11β-monooxygenase, is a steroid hydroxylase found in the zona glomerulosa and zona fasciculata of the adrenal cortex. Named officially the cytochrome P450 11B1, mitochondrial, it is a protein that in humans is encoded by the CYP11B1 gene. The enzyme is involved in the biosynthesis of adrenal corticosteroids by catalyzing the addition of hydroxyl groups during oxidation reactions.

== Gene ==
The CYP11B1 gene encodes 11β-hydroxylase, a member of the cytochrome P450 superfamily of enzymes. The cytochrome P450 proteins are monooxygenases that catalyze many reactions involved in drug metabolism and synthesis of cholesterol, steroids and other lipids. The product of this CYP11B1 gene is the 11β-hydroxylase protein. This protein localizes to the mitochondrial inner membrane and is involved in the conversion of various steroids in the adrenal cortex. Transcript variants encoding different isoforms have been noted for this gene.

The CYP11B1 gene is reversibly inhibited by etomidate and metyrapone.

== Function ==
11β-hydroxylase is a steroidogenic enzyme, i.e. the enzyme involved in the metabolism of steroids. The enzyme is primarily localized in the zona glomerulosa and zona fasciculata of the adrenal cortex. The enzyme functions by introducing a hydroxyl group at carbon position 11β on the steroid nucleus, thereby facilitating the conversion of certain steroids.

Humans have two isozymes with 11β-hydroxylase activity: CYP11B1 and CYP11B2.

CYP11B1 (11β-hydroxylase) is expressed at high levels and is regulated by ACTH, while CYP11B2 (aldosterone synthase) is usually expressed at low levels and is regulated by angiotensin II. In addition to the 11β-hydroxylase activity, both isozymes have 18-hydroxylase activity. The CYP11B1 isozyme has strong 11β-hydroxylase activity, but the activity of 18-hydroxylase is only one-tenth of CYP11B2. The weak 18-hydroxylase activity of CYP11B1 explains why an adrenal with suppressed CYP11B2 expression continues to synthesize 18-hydroxycorticosterone.

Here are some of the steroids, grouped by catalytic activity of the CYP11B1 isozyme:

- strong activity:
  - 11-deoxycortisol to cortisol
  - 11-deoxycorticosterone to corticosterone
- medium activity:
  - progesterone to 11β-hydroxyprogesterone
  - 17α-hydroxyprogesterone to 21-deoxycortisol
  - androstenedione to 11β-hydroxyandrostenedione
  - testosterone to 11β-hydroxytestosterone
- weak activity:
  - corticosterone to 18-hydroxycorticosterone
  - cortisol to 18-hydroxycortisol

== Cortisol and corticosterone metabolism ==
11β-hydroxylase has strong catalytic activity during conversion of 11-deoxycortisol to cortisol and 11-deoxycorticosterone to corticosterone, by catalyzing the hydroxylation of carbon hydrogen bond at 11-beta position. Note the extra "–OH" added at the 11 position (near the center, on ring "C"):

11-Deoxycortisol

Cortisol
11-Deoxycorticosterone

Corticosterone

== Mechanism of action ==
As a mitochondrial P450 system, P450c11 is dependent on two electron transfer proteins, adrenodoxin reductase and adrenodoxin that transfer 2 electrons from NADPH to the P450 for each monooxygenase reaction catalyzed by the enzyme. In most respects this process of electron transfer appears similar to that of P450scc system that catalyzes cholesterol side chain cleavage. Similar to P450scc the process of electrons transfer is leaky leading to superoxide production. The rate of electron leakage during metabolism depends on the functional groups of the steroid substrate.

== Regulation ==
The expression of the enzyme in adrenocortical cells is regulated by the trophic hormone corticotropin (ACTH).

== Clinical significance ==
A mutation in genes encoding 11β-hydroxylase is associated with congenital adrenal hyperplasia due to 11β-hydroxylase deficiency.

11β-hydroxylase is involved in the metabolism of 17α-hydroxyprogesterone to 21-deoxycortisol, in cases of congenital adrenal hyperplasia due to 21-hydroxylase deficiency.

== See also ==
- Steroidogenic enzyme

== Additional images ==
Steroidogenesis, showing steroid 11-beta-hydroxylase vertically at right.

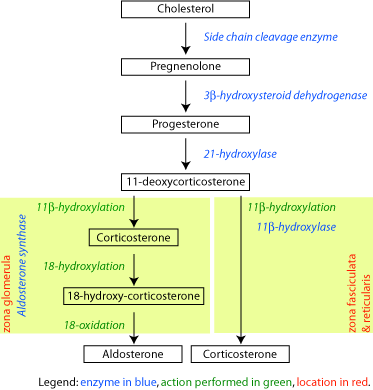
Corticosteroid biosynthetic pathway in rat

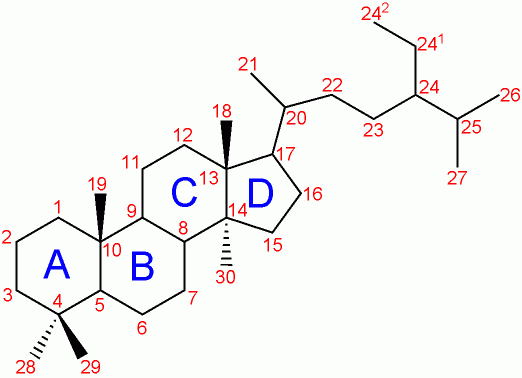
Steroid numbering
