= 18-Hydroxycorticosterone =

Chemical compound

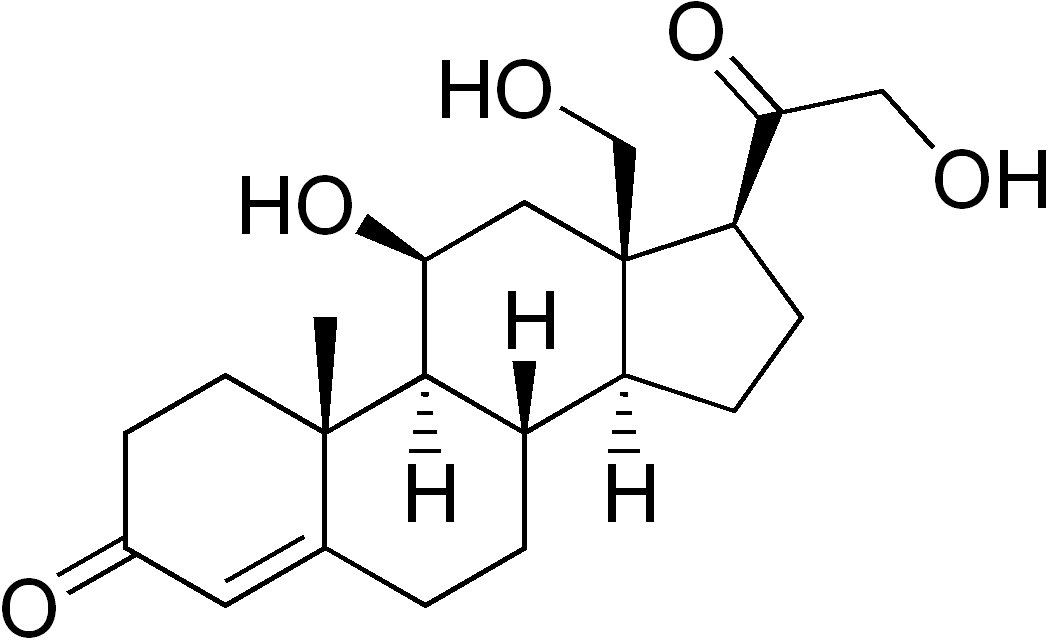

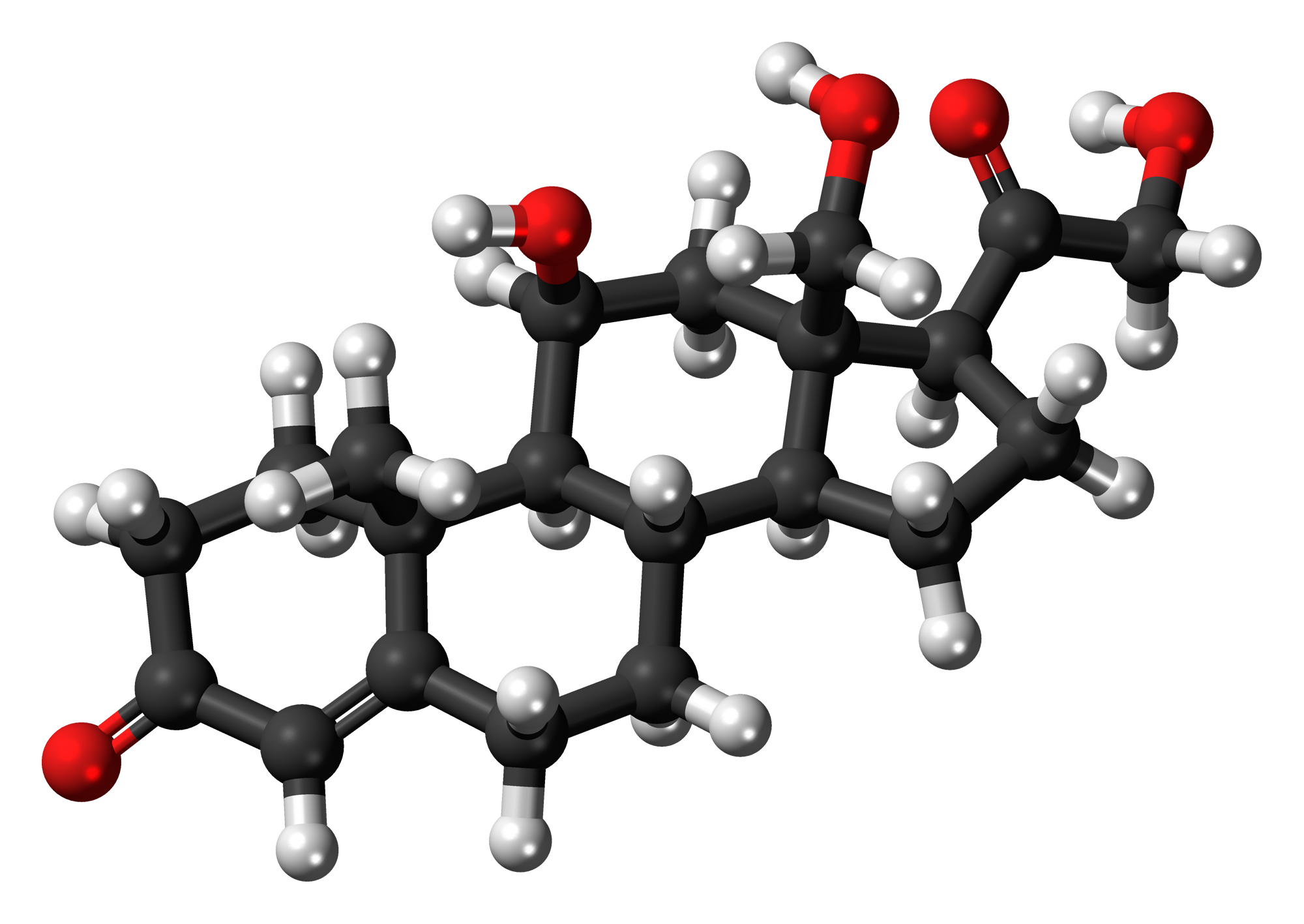

Names
- IUPAC name 11β,18,21-Trihydroxypregn-4-ene-3,20-dione
- Systematic IUPAC name (1S,3aS,3bS,9aR,9bS,10S,11aR)-10-Hydroxy-1-(hydroxyacetyl)-11a-(hydroxymethyl)-9a-methyl-1,2,3,3a,3b,4,5,8,9,9a,9b,10,11,11a-tetradecahydro-7H-cyclopenta[a]phenanthren-7-one

Identifiers
CAS Number	561-65-9
3D model (JSmol)	Interactive image
ChEBI	CHEBI:16485
ChemSpider	10748
ECHA InfoCard	100.008.384
MeSH	18-hydroxycorticosterone
PubChem CID	11222
UNII	4U5T0O9SI3
CompTox Dashboard (EPA)	DTXSID80897516
- InChI: InChI=1S/C21H30O5/c1-20-7-6-13(24)8-12(20)2-3-14-15-4-5-16(18(26)10-22)21(15,11-23)9-17(25)19(14)20/h8,14-17,19,22-23,25H,2-7,9-11H2,1H3/t14-,15-,16+,17-,19+,20-,21+/m0/s1 Key: HFSXHZZDNDGLQN-ZVIOFETBSA-N; InChI=1/C21H30O5/c1-20-7-6-13(24)8-12(20)2-3-14-15-4-5-16(18(26)10-22)21(15,11-23)9-17(25)19(14)20/h8,14-17,19,22-23,25H,2-7,9-11H2,1H3/t14-,15-,16+,17-,19+,20-,21+/m0/s1 Key: HFSXHZZDNDGLQN-ZVIOFETBBO
- SMILES: O=C4\C=C2/[C@]([C@H]1[C@@H](O)C[C@@]3([C@@H](C(=O)CO)CC[C@H]3[C@@H]1CC2)CO)(C)CC4

Properties
Chemical formula	C_{21}H_{30}O_{5}
Molar mass	362.46 g/mol
- Except where otherwise noted, data are given for materials in their standard state (at 25 °C [77 °F], 100 kPa). verify (what is ?) Infobox references

18-Hydroxycorticosterone is an endogenous steroid. It is a derivative of corticosterone.

== Function ==
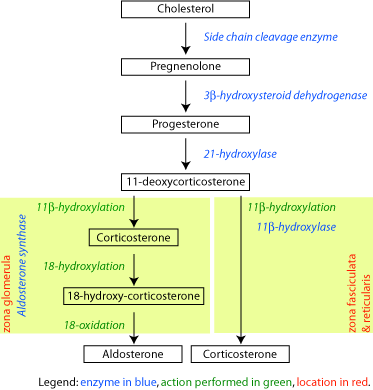
Corticosteroid biosynthetic pathway in rat

18-Hydroxycorticosterone is an intermediate in the synthesis of aldosterone by the enzyme aldosterone synthase in the zona glomerulosa. It is also an intermediate in the biosynthesis of corticosterone. It spontaneously and reversibly converts to various less polar forms and derivatives, some of which are precursors to aldosterone or corticosterone. Specifically, 21-hydroxy-11,18-oxido-4-pregnene-3,20-dione (18-DAL) is hydroxylated to aldosterone in the presence of malate and NADP+ at pH 4.8, indicating that 18-DAL acts as a metabolic intermediate between 18-hydroxycorticosterone and aldosterone. Corticosterone is a mediate precursor in this biosynthesis pathway, with 18-hydroxycorticosterone serving as an intermediate between corticosterone and aldosterone.

== See also ==
- 18-Hydroxycortisol
- Aldosterone synthase
