= Zona reticularis =

Layer of adrenal cortex

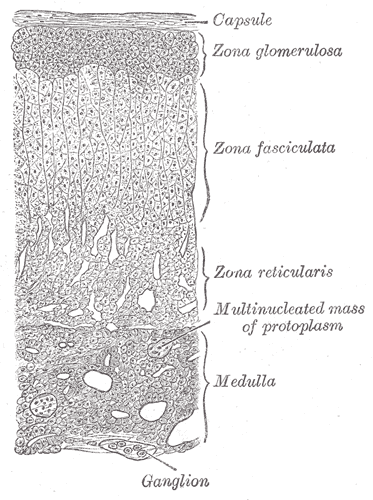
- Layers of cortex.

Details

Identifiers
- Latin: zona reticularis
- MeSH: D015385
- FMA: 69236

The zona reticularis (sometimes, reticulate zone) is the innermost layer of the adrenal cortex, lying deep to the zona fasciculata and superficial to the adrenal medulla. The cells are arranged cords that project in different directions giving a net-like appearance (L. reticulum - net).

Cells in the zona reticularis produce precursor androgens including dehydroepiandrosterone (DHEA) and androstenedione from cholesterol. DHEA is further converted to DHEA-sulfate via a sulfotransferase, SULT2A1. These precursors are not further converted in the adrenal cortex if the cells lack 17β-Hydroxysteroid dehydrogenase. Instead, they are released into the blood stream and taken up in the testicles and ovaries to produce testosterone and the estrogens respectively.

ACTH partially regulates adrenal androgen secretion, also CRH.

In humans, the reticularis layer does contain 17α-hydroxylase; this hydroxylates pregnenolone, which is then converted to cortisol by a mixed function oxidase. Deficiency of 17α-hydroxylase results in low blood levels of estrogens, androgens, and cortisol, and the resultant compensatory increases in adrenocorticotrophic hormone stimulates the production of 11-deoxycorticosterone and corticosterone. In rodents, the lack of 17α-hydroxylase results in the compensatory synthesis of corticosterone instead of cortisol.

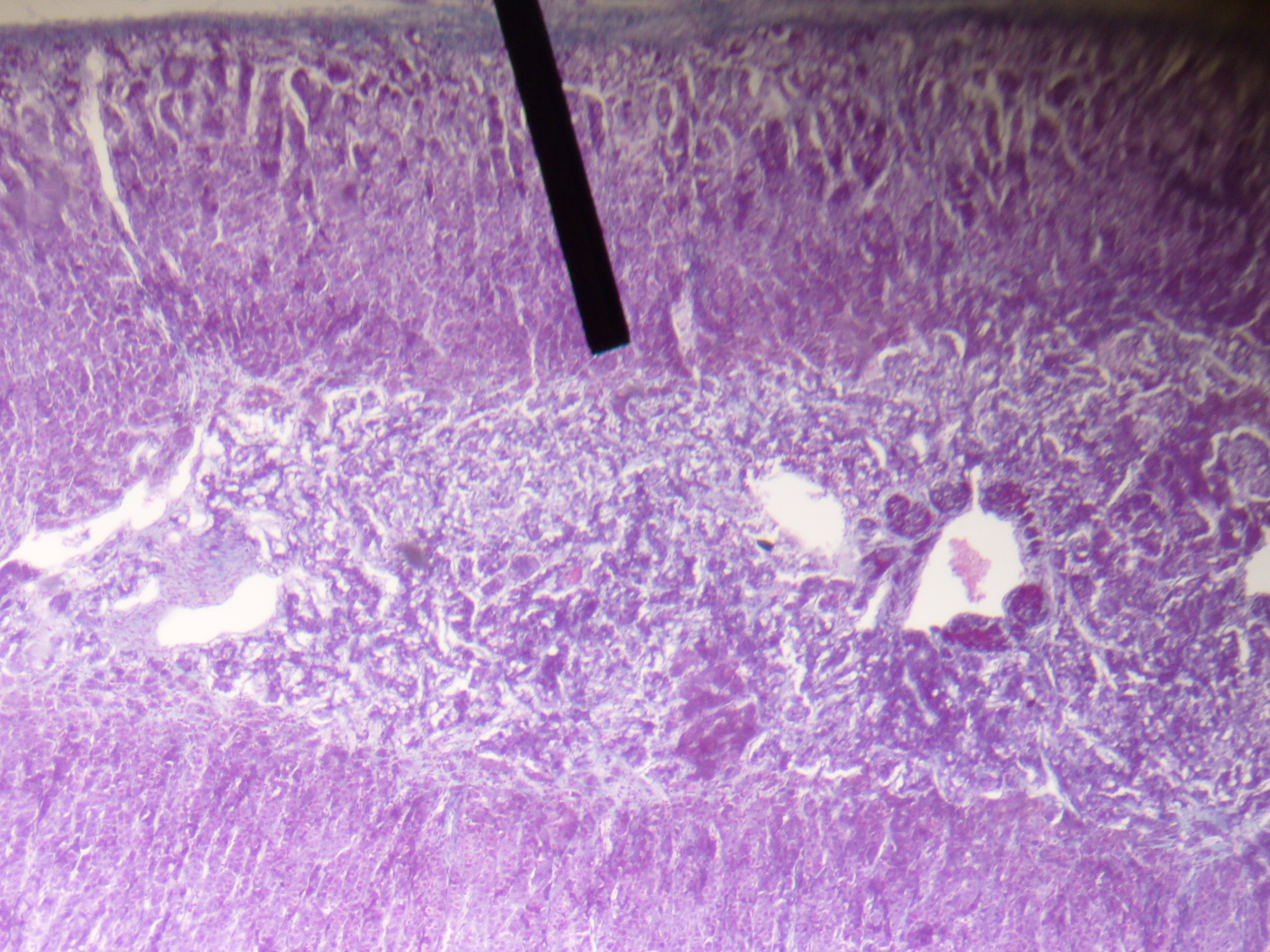
Adrenal gland (zona reticularis layer).
