= Vicadrostat =

Pharmacological agent

Vicadrostat INN: Vicadrostat

Clinical data
- Other names: BI 690517; CS-1099562, VICADROSTAT (USAN US)
- Routes of administration: oral
- Drug class: Inhibitor of aldosterone and cortisol synthesis; SGLT2 inhibitor (in combination with empagliflozin)
- ATC code: none

Pharmacokinetic data
- Elimination half-life: 4.4 to 6.3 hours

Identifiers
- IUPAC name: 2-Chloro-4-[(6R)-6-(hydroxymethyl)-6-methyl-4-oxo-7H-pyrano[3,4-d]imidazol-3-yl]benzonitrile
- CAS Number: 1868065-21-7
- PubChem CID: 118676295
- IUPHAR/BPS: 13885
- DrugBank: DB21693
- UNII: AF4VW4GA3H
- KEGG: D13192
- ChEMBL: ChEMBL6068035

Chemical and physical data
- Formula: C_{15}H_{12}ClN_{3}O_{3}
- Molar mass: 317.73 g·mol^{−1}
- 3D model (JSmol): Interactive image
- SMILES: C[C@@]1(CC2=C(C(=O)O1)N(C=N2)C3=CC(=C(C=C3)C#N)Cl)CO
- InChI: InChI=1S/C15H12ClN3O3/c1-15(7-20)5-12-13(14(21)22-15)19(8-18-12)10-3-2-9(6-17)11(16)4-10/h2-4,8,20H,5,7H2,1H3/t15-/m1/s1; Key:MCVIVPZYYMNCAW-OAHLLOKOSA-N

Vicadrostat is also known by a number of code names; one of the best known is BI 690517. This is an experimental low-molecular-weight drug which acts as an inhibitor of aldosterone and cortisol synthesis and is proposed for use in combination with the SGLT2 inhibitor empagliflozin (is abbreviated to VicaEmpa) to treat people with type 2 diabetes, high blood pressure, cardiovascular disease and kidney disease.

== Pharmacology ==
=== Pharmacodynamics ===
Vicadrostat is an aldosterone synthase inhibitor; Phase II clinical trials (involving 586 patients) have shown that a 10 mg dose of vicadrostat reduces the urinary albumin-to-creatinine ratio by approximately 40% compared with placebo; this effect is achieved both with and without concomitant use of an SGLT2 inhibitor (empagliflozin).
