= Spongiocyte =

Type of cell in the zona fasciculata

Details
- Location: Adrenal cortex

In the human endocrine system, a spongiocyte is a cell in the zona fasciculata of the adrenal cortex containing lipid droplets that show pronounced vacuolization, due to the way the cells are prepared for microscopic examination.

The lipid droplets contain neutral fats, fatty acids, cholesterol, and phospholipids; all of which are precursors to the steroid hormones secreted by the adrenal glands. The principal hormone secreted from the cells of the zona fasciculata are glucocorticoids, but some androgens are produced as well.
