= Aldosterone synthase =

Protein-coding gene in the species Homo sapiens

CYP11B2
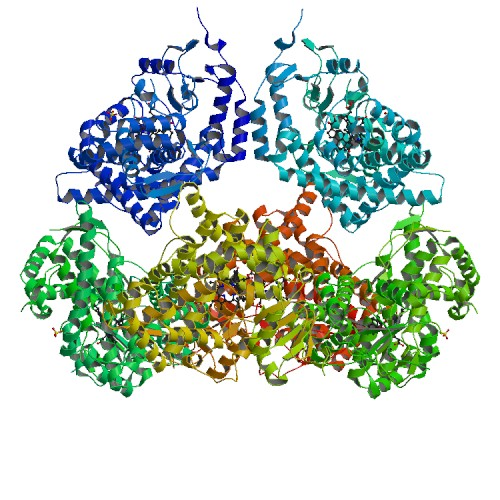

Identifiers
- Aliases: CYP11B2, ALDOS, CPN2, CYP11B, CYP11BL, CYPXIB2, P-450C18, P450C18, P450aldo, cytochrome P450 family 11 subfamily B member 2
- External IDs: OMIM: 124080; MGI: 88583; GeneCards: CYP11B2
Available structures
PDB	Human UniProt search: PDBe RCSB
PDB	List of PDB id codes 4DVQ, 4FDH, 4ZGX
Enzyme activity
EC #	BRENDA	ExPASy	KEGG	MetaCyc
1.14.15.4	↗	↗	↗	↗
1.14.15.5	↗	↗	↗	↗

Gene location (Human)
Chr.	Chromosome 8 (human)
Band	8q24.3	Start	142,910,559 bp
Band	8q24.3	End	142,917,843 bp

Gene location (Mouse)
Chr.	Chromosome 15 (mouse)
Band	15 D3|15 34.29 cM	Start	74,705,974 bp
Band	15 D3|15 34.29 cM	End	74,713,492 bp
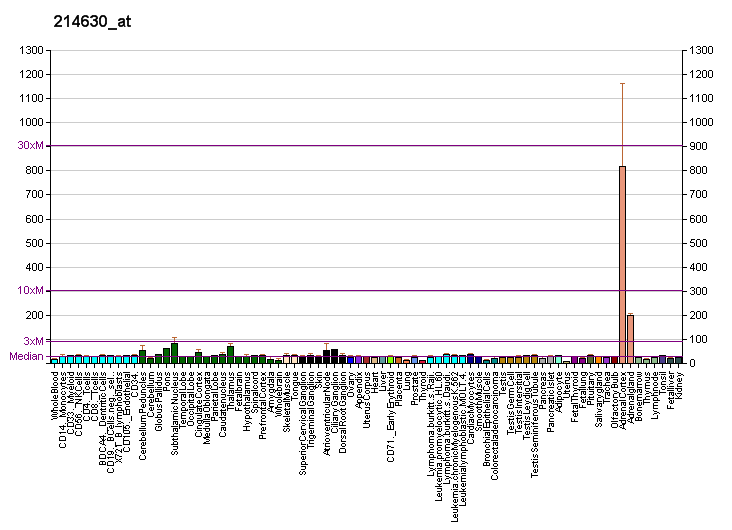
RNA expression pattern
Bgee	Human / Mouse (ortholog); Top expressed in: right adrenal cortex; left adrenal gland; left adrenal cortex; testicle; fundus; connective tissue; adipose tissue; heart; atrium; right atrium / Top expressed in: adrenal gland; gastrula; decidua; umbilical cord; spinal ganglia; extraocular muscle; upper arm; triceps brachii muscle; ureter; testicle; More reference expression data
BioGPS	More reference expression data
Gene ontology
Molecular function	iron ion binding; corticosterone 18-monooxygenase activity; metal ion binding; monooxygenase activity; heme binding; oxidoreductase activity, acting on paired donors, with incorporation or reduction of molecular oxygen; oxidoreductase activity; steroid 11-beta-monooxygenase activity; steroid hydroxylase activity
Cellular component	mitochondrial membranes; membrane; mitochondrion; mitochondrial inner membrane
Biological process	lipid metabolism; aldosterone biosynthetic process; cortisol biosynthetic process; C21-steroid hormone biosynthetic process; cellular response to hormone stimulus; potassium ion homeostasis; mineralocorticoid biosynthetic process; regulation of blood volume by renal aldosterone; renal water homeostasis; sterol metabolic process; sodium ion homeostasis; cellular response to potassium ion; steroid biosynthetic process; steroid metabolic process; glucocorticoid biosynthetic process; cholesterol metabolic process; cellular response to peptide hormone stimulus; cortisol metabolic process
Sources:Amigo / QuickGO
Orthologs
Databases	NCBI: entry; OMA: entry
Species	Human	Mouse
Entrez	1585	110115
Ensembl	ENSG00000179142	ENSMUSG00000075604
UniProt	P19099	n/a
RefSeq (mRNA)	NM_000498	NM_001033229
RefSeq (protein)	NP_000489	n/a
Location (UCSC)	Chr 8: 142.91 – 142.92 Mb	Chr 15: 74.71 – 74.71 Mb
PubMed search
- Wikidata
View/Edit Human	View/Edit Mouse

Aldosterone synthase, also called steroid 18-hydroxylase, corticosterone 18-monooxygenase or P450C18, is a steroid hydroxylase cytochrome P450 enzyme involved in the biosynthesis of the mineralocorticoid aldosterone and other steroids. The enzyme catalyzes sequential hydroxylations of the steroid angular methyl group at C18 after initial 11β-hydroxylation (the enzyme has steroid 18-hydroxylase activity as well as steroid 11 beta-hydroxylase activity). It is encoded by the CYP11B2 gene in humans.

Aldosterone synthase is a protein which is only expressed in the zona glomerulosa of the adrenal cortex and is primarily regulated by the renin–angiotensin system. It is the sole enzyme capable of synthesizing aldosterone in humans and plays an important role in electrolyte balance and blood pressure.

== Genetics ==
Aldosterone synthase is encoded on chromosome 8q22 by the CYP11B2 gene. The gene contains 9 exons and spans roughly 7000 base pairs of DNA. CYP11B2 is closely related with CYP11B1. The two genes show 93% homology to each other and are both encoded on the same chromosome. Research has shown that calcium ions activate transcription factors at CYP11B2 through well defined interactions at the 5'-flanking region of CYP11B2.

Aldosterone synthase is a member of the cytochrome P450 superfamily of enzymes. The cytochrome P450 proteins are monooxygenases that catalyze many reactions involved in drug metabolism and synthesis of cholesterol, steroids, and other lipids.

== Function ==
Aldosterone synthase is the enzyme that has steroid 18-hydroxylase activity as well as steroid 11 beta-hydroxylase activity. The 18-hydroxylase activity consists in catalyzing sequential hydroxylations of the steroid angular methyl group at C18.

Whereas steroid 11β-hydroxylase (encoded by CYP11B1 gene) only catalyzes hydroxylation at position 11 beta (mainly of 11-deoxycorticosterone and 11-deoxycortisol), aldosterone synthase (encoded by CYP11B2 gene) catalyzes the synthesis of aldosterone from deoxycorticosterone, a process that successively requires hydroxylation at positions 11 beta and 18 and oxidation at position 18.

Adrenocorticotropic hormone is assumed to play a role in the regulation of aldosterone synthase likely through stimulating the synthesis of 11-deoxycorticosterone which is the initial substrate of the enzymatic action in aldosterone synthase.

Renin–angiotensin system schematic showing aldosterone activity on the right

== Metabolism ==
Biosynthetic pathway of aldosterone starting with progesterone

Aldosterone synthase converts 11-deoxycorticosterone to corticosterone, to 18-hydroxycorticosterone, and finally to aldosterone:

11-deoxycorticosterone

Corticosterone

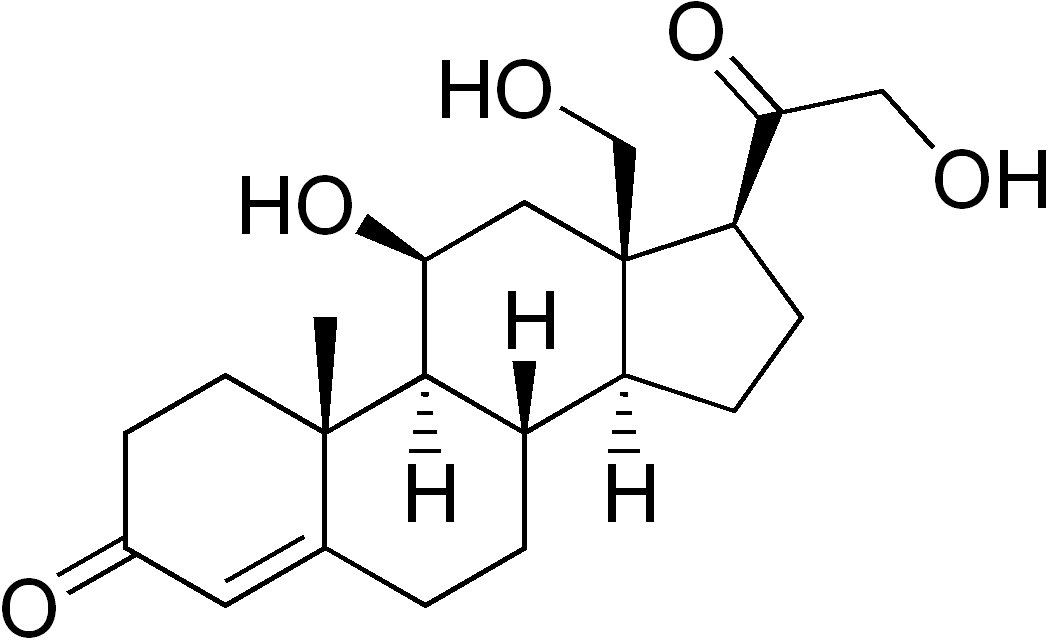
18-hydroxycorticosterone

Aldosterone

In human metabolism the biosynthesis of aldosterone largely depends on the metabolism of cholesterol. Cholesterol is metabolized in what is known as the early pathway of aldosterone synthesis and is hydroxylated becoming (20R,22R)-dihydroxycholesterol which is then metabolized as a direct precursor to pregnenolone. Pregnenolone can then followed one of two pathways which involve the metabolism of progesterone or the testosterone and estradiol biosynthesis. Aldosterone is synthesized by following the metabolism of progesterone.

In the potential case where aldosterone synthase is not metabolically active the body accumulates 11-deoxycorticosterone. This increases salt retention leading to increased hypertension.

== Substrates ==
Aldosterone synthase shows different catalytic activity during metabolism of its substrates. Here are some of the substrates, grouped by catalytic activity of the enzyme:

- strong:
  - 11-deoxycorticosterone to corticosterone and aldosterone;
- medium:
  - 11-deoxycortisol to 18-hydroxycortisol and cortisol;
- weak:
  - progesterone to 11β-hydroxyprogesterone,
  - testosterone to 18-hydroxytestosterone and 11β-Hydroxytestosterone,
  - androstendione (to 11β-Hydroxyandrostendione and 18-hydroxyandrostendione);
- very weak:
  - corticosterone,
  - cortisol to 18-hydroxycortisol,
  - 18-Hydroxy-11-deoxycorticosterone,
  - 21-hydroxypregnenolone.

== Methyl oxidase deficiency ==
Lack of metabolically active aldosterone synthase leads to corticosterone methyl oxidase deficiency type I and II. The deficiency is characterized clinically by salt-wasting, failure to thrive, and growth retardation. The in-active proteins are caused by the autosomal recessive inheritance of defective CYP11B2 genes in which genetic mutations destroy the enzymatic activity of aldosterone synthase. Deficient aldosterone synthase activity results in impaired biosynthesis of aldosterone while corticosterone in the zona glomerulosa is excessively produced in both corticosterone methyl oxidase deficiency type I and II. The corticosterone methyl oxidase deficiencies both share this effect however type I causes an overall deficiency of 18-hydroxycorticosterone while type II overproduces it.

== Enzymatic inhibition ==
Inhibition of aldosterone synthase is currently being investigated as a medical treatment for hypertension, heart failure, and renal disorders. Deactivation of enzymatic activity reduces aldosterone concentrations in plasma and tissues which decreases mineralocorticoid receptor-dependent and independent effects in cardiac vascular and renal target organs. Inhibition has shown to decrease plasma and urinary aldosterone concentrations by 70 - 80%, rapid hypokalaemia correction, moderate decrease of blood pressure, and an increase plasma renin activity in patients who are on a low-sodium diet. Ongoing medical research is focusing on the synthesis of second-generation aldosterone synthase inhibitors to create an ideally selective inhibitor as the current, orally delivered, LCl699 has shown to be non-specific to aldosterone synthase.

- LCI699/Osilodrostat
- Baxdrostat
- Lorundrostat
- Dexfadrostat
- BI-690517/Vicadrostat
- JX09/PB6440

== See also ==
- Steroidogenic enzyme
- Hypoaldosteronism
- Glucocorticoid remediable aldosteronism
