= Maria New =

American geneticist

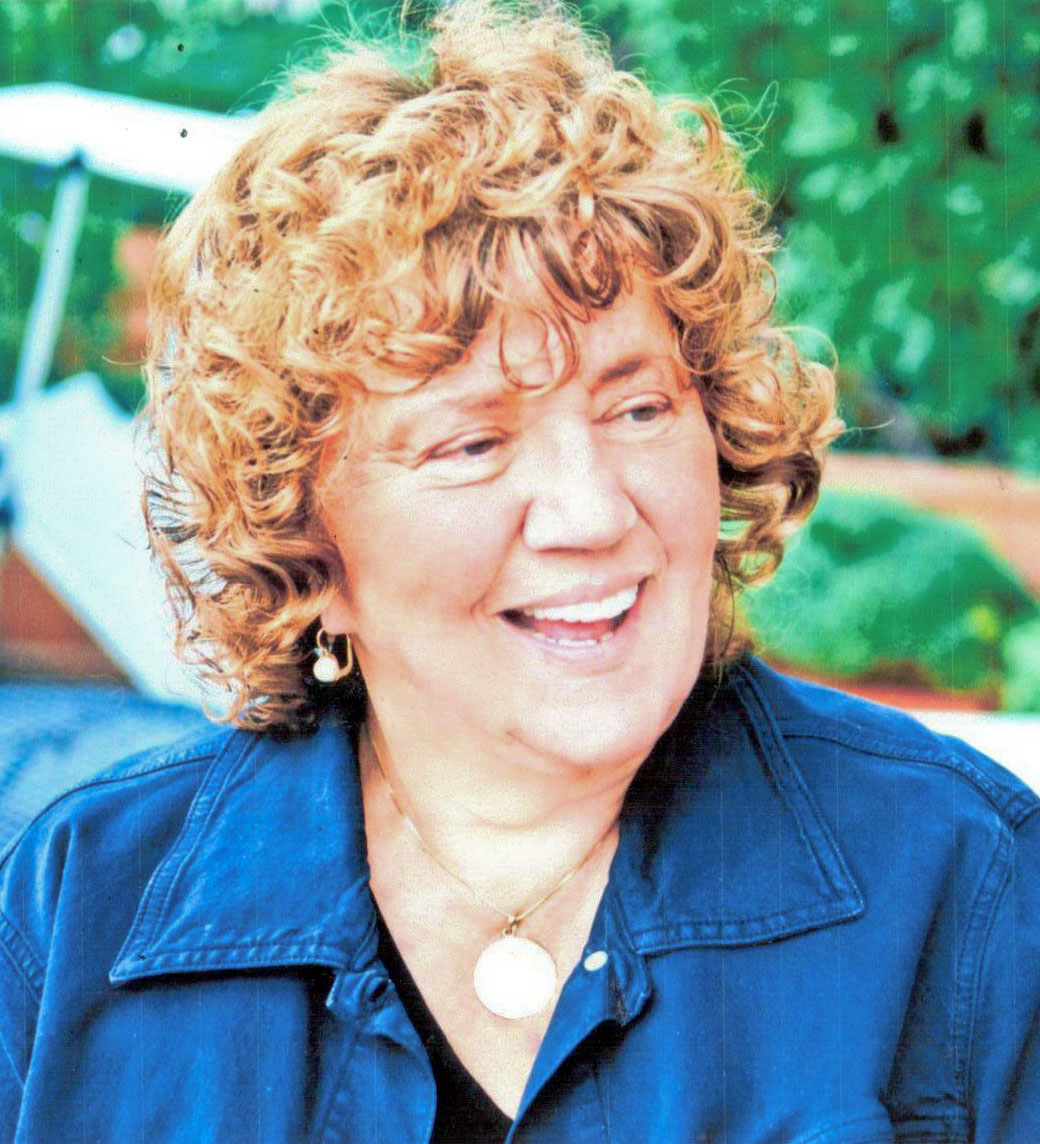
- Born: December 11, 1928
- Died: July 26, 2024 (aged 95)
- Education: Cornell University, Perelman School of Medicine at the University of Pennsylvania
- Children: 3
- Awards: Fellow of the New York Academy of Medicine, Fred Conrad Koch Award, member of the National Academy of Sciences
- Scientific career
- Fields: pediatric endocrinology, medicine
- Workplaces: Icahn School of Medicine at Mount Sinai, Cornell University

Maria Iandolo New (December 11, 1928 - July 26, 2024) was a professor of pediatrics, genomics and genetics at Icahn School of Medicine at Mount Sinai in New York City. She was an expert in congenital adrenal hyperplasia (CAH), a genetic condition affecting the adrenal gland that can affect sexual development.

== Medical education ==
New received her undergraduate degree in chemistry with a minor in Latin from Cornell University in Ithaca, New York, in 1950, and her M. D. from the Perelman School of Medicine at the University of Pennsylvania in Philadelphia, in 1954. She completed an internship in medicine at Bellevue Hospital in New York, followed by a residency in pediatrics at the New York Hospital. From 1957 to 1958 she studied renal functioning under a fellowship from the National Institutes of Health (NIH). She was a research pediatrician to the Diabetic Study Group of the Comprehensive Care Teaching Program at the New York Hospital-Cornell Medical Center from 1958 to 1961, and had a second NIH fellowship under Ralph E. Peterson from 1961 to 1964, to study specific steroid hormone production during infancy, childhood and adolescence.

== Career ==
In 1964, New was appointed chief of pediatric endocrinology at Cornell University Medical College, a position she held for 40 years. In 1978, she was named Harold and Percy Uris professor of pediatric endocrinology and metabolism. In 1980, New was appointed hair of the Department of Pediatrics at Cornell University Medical College and pediatrician-in-chief of the Department of Pediatrics at New York-Presbyterian Hospital. She was one of the few women in the country to serve as chair of a major division of a medical college, and her tenure lasted for 22 years. While chair, New founded and directed the 8-bed Children's Clinical Research Center, a clinical research center in pediatrics with groundbreaking research in pediatric endocrinology, hematology, and immunology, during the emergence of AIDS. In 2004, New was recruited to the Mount Sinai School of Medicine as professor of pediatrics and human genetics, and director of the Adrenal Steroid Disorders Program. She was also adjunct professor of genetics at Columbia College of Physicians and Surgeons, and associate dean for research at the Herbert Wertheim College of Medicine at Florida International University.

New is recognized as one of the world's leading pediatric endocrinologists. Her career links clinical and basic science. She has continued her scientific research, including the use of molecular genetic diagnosis, prenatal diagnosis and treatment. Although steroid physiology was well understood when New began her scientific career, little of the knowledge had been applied to the understanding of steroid disorders in children. New's research on the mechanism and genetics of steroid disorders has established standards for pre- and post-natal care for patients with congenital adrenal hyperplasia and apparent mineralocorticoid excess.

During a 43-year period, New held the longest continuously funded National Institutes of Health grant, "Androgen Metabolism in Childhood", which supported research characterizing the diverse clinical spectra of patients with rare steroidogenic enzyme defects, such as congenital adrenal hyperplasia, and their metabolic consequences.

Her later primary research emphasis was on genetic steroid disorders. New continued to study three monogenic disorders: 21-hydroxylase deficiency, 11β-hydroxylase deficiency, and apparent mineralocorticoid excess, emphasizing genotype/phenotype correlation and prenatal diagnosis and treatment. She has published more than 640 academic articles in a wide range of prestigious journals and published a genetics book entitled Genetic Steroid Disorders in 2014. She has also received numerous awards recognizing her work treating mothers and children affected with the disorder.

== Principal discoveries ==
In 1977, New first described apparent mineralocorticoid excess (AME) in a Zuni girl. Her team was the first to publish mutations on the 11β-hydroxysteroid dehydrogenase type 2 enzyme (encoded by the HSD11B2 gene) causing this potentially fatal form of low renin hypertension. New opened a new field of receptor biology by demonstrating the action of the 11β-HSD2 enzyme at the mineralocorticoid receptor of the distal renal tubule to metabolize cortisol to cortisone and thus protect the receptor. This was the first demonstration of the metabolism of a ligand to down-regulate its action on receptor activation.

In 1979, New described a form of mild steroid 21-hydroxylase deficiency called nonclassical 21-hydroxylase deficiency, which is characterized by diverse hyperandrogenic symptoms appearing postnatally in males and females. The remarkable prevalence of 1 in 27 Ashkenazi Jews of a mild form of CAH was documented by New in 1985 and the genetic frequency of the mutation is 1 in 3 in the Ashkenazi Jewish population. These studies established nonclassical 21-hydroxylase deficiency as the most frequent disorder of all autosomal recessive diseases in humans. While a spectrum of severity of congenital adrenal hyperplasia had always been observed, New was first to identify the mild form with specific molecular mutations.

== Prenatal Dexamethasone ==
Ethical issues have been raised about New's research. Namely, it has been questioned whether pregnant women undergoing treatment for the possible effects of congenital adrenal hyperplasia on their unborn babies were properly informed concerning the treatments that were administered to them. In September 2010 the FDA found nothing worth pursuing. In a 2012 article Alice Dreger followed up on the issues involved. Further research and long term studies are needed to establish the correct usage guideline.

== Awards and honors ==
- Judson J. Van Wyk Prize, Lawson Wilkins Pediatric Endocrine Society (2010)
- Fred Conrad Koch Award, The Endocrine Society (2003), the highest prize from the American Endocrine Society
- MERIT Award, National Institute of Child Health and Human Development (1998)
- Rhône-Poulenc Rorer Clinical Investigator Award, The Endocrine Society (1995)
- Dale Medal, Society for Endocrinology (1995)
- Robert H. Williams Distinguished Leadership Award, The Endocrine Society (1988), the highest award from the British Endocrine Society
- University of Pennsylvania Distinguished Graduate Award
- St. Geme Lectureship, University of Colorado School of Medicine (2010)
- President, Lawson Wilkins Pediatric Endocrine Society (1985)

Elected Member of the US National Academy of Sciences, National Academy of Medicine, and the American Academy of Arts and Sciences
