= Lorundrostat =

Chemical compound

Clinical data
- Other names: MLS 101

Legal status
- Legal status: Investigational

Identifiers
- IUPAC name: N-(4-Acetamidocyclohexyl)-2-[4-[5-(4-methylphenyl)-1,2,4-triazin-3-yl]piperazin-1-yl]acetamide
- CAS Number: 1820940-17-7
- PubChem CID: 126567187
- ChemSpider: 123963150
- UNII: KA8W5LDS6Z
- KEGG: D12773
- ChEMBL: ChEMBL5095105

Chemical and physical data
- Formula: C_{24}H_{33}N_{7}O_{2}
- Molar mass: 451.575 g·mol^{−1}
- 3D model (JSmol): Interactive image
- SMILES: CC1=CC=C(C=C1)C2=CN=NC(=N2)N3CCN(CC3)CC(=O)NC4CCC(CC4)NC(=O)C
- InChI: InChI=1S/C24H33N7O2/c1-17-3-5-19(6-4-17)22-15-25-29-24(28-22)31-13-11-30(12-14-31)16-23(33)27-21-9-7-20(8-10-21)26-18(2)32/h3-6,15,20-21H,7-14,16H2,1-2H3,(H,26,32)(H,27,33); Key:YHGVDZULVMINCJ-UHFFFAOYSA-N

Lorundrostat (developmental name MLS 101) is an aldosterone synthase inhibitor developed by Mineralys Therapeutics for high blood pressure. In clinical trials as an add-on medication for people with uncontrolled hypertension, decreased renin and elevated aldosterone it significantly reduced blood pressure. Hyperkalemia occurred in some trial participants.

In a meta-analysis analysing data from 3 randomized controlled trials over 3 months of clinical use, lorundrostat at 50-100mg/day was found to be effective in lowering blood pressure, with associated issues of mild increase in serum potassium levels and decline in the glomerular filtration rate
