= 11-Deoxycorticosterone =

Names
- IUPAC name 21-Hydroxypregn-4-ene-3,20-dione
- Systematic IUPAC name (1S,3aS,3bS,9aR,9bS,11aS)-1-(Hydroxyacetyl)-9a,11a-dimethyl-1,2,3,3a,3b,4,5,8,9,9a,9b,10,11,11a-tetradecahydro-7H-cyclopenta[a]phenanthren-7-one
- Other names Deoxycorticosterone; Desoxycortone; Deoxycortone; Cortexone; 21-Hydroxyprogesterone; 21-Hydroxy-4-pregnene-3,20-dione; Reichstein's substance Q; Kendall's desoxy compound B; NSC-11319

Identifiers
CAS Number	64-85-7
3D model (JSmol)	Interactive image
ChEBI	CHEBI:16973
ChEMBL	ChEMBL1498
ChemSpider	5932
ECHA InfoCard	100.000.543
IUPHAR/BPS	2871
PubChem CID	6166
UNII	40GP35YQ49
CompTox Dashboard (EPA)	DTXSID0045254
- InChI: InChI=1S/C21H30O3/c1-20-9-7-14(23)11-13(20)3-4-15-16-5-6-18(19(24)12-22)21(16,2)10-8-17(15)20/h11,15-18,22H,3-10,12H2,1-2H3/t15-,16-,17-,18+,20-,21-/m0/s1 Key: ZESRJSPZRDMNHY-YFWFAHHUSA-N
- SMILES: O=C4\C=C2/[C@]([C@H]1CC[C@@]3([C@@H](C(=O)CO)CC[C@H]3[C@@H]1CC2)C)(C)CC4

Properties
Chemical formula	C_{21}H_{30}O_{3}
Molar mass	330.468 g/mol

Pharmacology
ATC code	H02AA03 (WHO)
- Except where otherwise noted, data are given for materials in their standard state (at 25 °C [77 °F], 100 kPa). Infobox references

11-Deoxycorticosterone (DOC), or simply deoxycorticosterone, also known as 21-hydroxyprogesterone, as well as desoxycortone (INN), deoxycortone, and cortexone, is a steroid hormone produced by the adrenal gland that possesses mineralocorticoid activity and acts as a precursor to aldosterone. It is an active (Na+-retaining) mineralocorticoid. As its names indicate, 11-deoxycorticosterone can be understood as the 21-hydroxy-variant of progesterone or as the 11-deoxy-variant of corticosterone.

DOCA is the abbreviation for the ester 11-deoxycorticosterone acetate.

== Biological activity ==
DOC is a potent mineralocorticoid but is virtually devoid of glucocorticoid activity. However, 11β-hydroxylation of DOC produces corticosterone and confers glucocorticoid activity, along with 10-fold reduced mineralocorticoid activity. In addition to its mineralocorticoid activity, DOC has been found to possess one-third to one-tenth the potency of progesterone as a progestogen when administered systematically to rabbits. However, it has no such activity when applied directly to the uterine mucosa of mice. The discrepancy may be related to the fact that DOC can be converted into progesterone in vivo.

== Biological role ==
DOC is a precursor molecule for the production of aldosterone. The major pathway for aldosterone production is in the adrenal glomerulosa zone of the adrenal gland. It is not a major secretory hormone. It is produced from progesterone by 21β-hydroxylase and is converted to corticosterone by 11β-hydroxylase. Corticosterone is then converted to aldosterone by aldosterone synthase.

Most of the DOC is secreted by the zona fasciculata of the adrenal cortex which also secretes cortisol, and a small amount by the zona glomerulosa, which secretes aldosterone. DOC stimulates the collecting tubules (the tubules which branch together to feed the bladder) to continue to excrete potassium in much the same way that aldosterone does but not like aldosterone in the end of the looped tubules (distal). At the same time it is not nearly so rigorous at retaining sodium as aldosterone, more than 20 times less. DOC accounts for only 1% of the sodium retention normally In addition to its inherent lack of vigor there is an escape mechanism controlled by an unknown non steroid hormone which overrides DOC's sodium conserving power after a few days just as aldosterone is overridden also. This hormone may be the peptide hormone kallikrein, which is augmented by DOC and suppressed by aldosterone. If sodium becomes very high, DOC also increases urine flow. DOC has about 1/20 of the sodium retaining power of aldosterone, and is said to be as little as one per cent of aldosterone at high water intakes. Since DOC has about 1/5 the potassium excreting power of aldosterone, it probably requires aldosterone's help if the serum potassium content becomes too high. DOC's injections do not cause much additional potassium excretion when sodium intake is low. This is probably because aldosterone is already stimulating potassium outflow. When sodium is low DOC probably would not have to be present, but when sodium rises aldosterone declines considerably, and DOC probably tends to take over.

DOC has a similar feedback with respect to potassium as aldosterone. A rise in serum potassium causes a rise in DOC secretion. However, sodium has little effect, and what effect it does have is direct. Angiotensin (the blood pressure hormone) has little effect on DOC, but DOC causes a rapid fall in renin, and therefore angiotensin I, the precursor of angiotensin II. Therefore, DOC must be indirectly inhibiting aldosterone since aldosterone depends on angiotensin II. Sodium, and therefore blood volume, is difficult to regulate internally. That is, when a large dose of sodium threatens the body with high blood pressure, it cannot be resolved by transferring sodium to the intracellular (inside the cell) space. The red cells would have been possible, but that would not change the blood volume. Potassium, on the other hand, can be moved into the large intracellular space, and apparently it is by DOC in rabbits. Thus, a problem in high blood potassium can be resolved somewhat without jettisoning too much of what is sometimes a dangerously scarce mineral that can not be pumped actively independently from sodium. It is imperative to keep total potassium adequate because a deficiency causes the heart to lose force. Movement of potassium into the cells would intensify the sodium problem somewhat because when potassium moves into the cell, a somewhat smaller amount of sodium moves out. Thus, it is desirable to resolve the blood pressure problem as much as possible by the fall in renin above, therefore avoiding loss of sodium, which was usually in very short supply on the African savannas where human ancestors probably evolved.

The resemblance of the pattern of the electromotive forces produced by DOC in the kidney tubules to normal potassium intake, and the total dissimilarity of their shape as produced by potassium deficient tubules, would tend to support the above view. The above attributes are consistent with a hormone which is relied upon to unload both excess sodium and potassium. DOC's action in augmenting kallikrein, the peptide hormone thought to be the sodium "escape hormone," and aldosterone's action in suppressing it, is also supportive of the above concept.

ACTH has more effect on DOC than it does on aldosterone. This difference may exist to give the immune system control over the electrolyte regulation during diarrhea since during dehydration, aldosterone virtually disappears even though renin and angiotensin rise high. It is because aldosterone disappears that potassium supplements are very dangerous during dehydration and must not be attempted until at least one hour after rehydration so the hormones can reach the nucleus.

DOC's primary purpose is to regulate electrolytes. However, it has other effects, such as to remove potassium from leucocytes and muscle, depress glycogen formation and to stimulate copper containing lysyl oxidase enzyme and connective tissue, which attributes may be used by the body to help survive during potassium wasting intestinal diseases. The greater efficiency of DOC in permitting sodium excretion (or perhaps it should be expressed as inefficiency at retention) must be partly through morphological changes in the kidney cells because escape from DOC's sodium retention takes several days to materialize, and when it does, these cells are much more efficient at unloading sodium if sodium is then added than cells accustomed to a prior low intake. Thus, paradoxically, a low salt intake should be protective against loss of sodium in perspiration.

Progesterone prevents some of the loss of potassium by DOC.

== Additional images ==
Steroidogenesis

Corticosterone

== See also ==
- 11-Deoxycortisol
- 17α-Hydroxyprogesterone
- Corticosterone
- Congenital adrenal hyperplasia

== Sources ==
- Abbrecht PH (September 1972). "Cardiovascular effects of chronic potassium deficiency in the dog". The American Journal of Physiology. 223 (3): 555–60. doi:10.1152/ajplegacy.1972.223.3.555. PMID 4403425.
- Bartlett GR, MacKay EM (July 1949). "Insulin stimulation of glycogen formation in rat abdominal muscle". Proceedings of the Society for Experimental Biology and Medicine. 71 (3): 493–5. doi:10.3181/00379727-71-17234. PMID 18136520. S2CID 31824669.
- Bauer JH, Gauntner WC (March 1979). "Effect of potassium chloride on plasma renin activity and plasma aldosterone during sodium restriction in normal man". Kidney International. 15 (3): 286–93. doi:10.1038/ki.1979.37. PMID 513492.
- Bönner G, Autenrieth R, Marin-Grez M, Rascher W, Gross F (1981). "Effects of sodium loading, desoxycorticosterone acetate, and corticosterone on urinary kallikrein excretion". Hormone Research. 14 (2): 87–94. doi:10.1159/000179365. PMID 6912177.
- Brown RD, Strott CA, Liddle GW (June 1972). "Site of stimulation of aldosterone biosynthesis by angiotensin and potassium". The Journal of Clinical Investigation. 51 (6): 1413–8. doi:10.1172/JCI106937. PMC 292278. PMID 4336939.
- Buckingham J, MacDonald F, Heilbron I, eds. (1995). Dictionary of Organic Compounds. Vol. 1 (6th ed.). CRC Press. ISBN 978-0412540905.
- Costanzo LS (2014). Physiology (International ed.). Lippincott Williams & Wilkins. ISBN 978-1469832005.
- Desaulles P (1958). Muller AF, O'Connor CM (eds.). Comparison of the effects of aldosterone, cortexone and cortisol on adrenalectomized rats under various salt loads. An International Symposium on Aldosterone, Geneva 1957. Boston: Little Brown Co. pp. 29–38. OCLC 14594852.
- Ellinghaus K (1971). "Sodium and potassium balance during the administration of desoxycorticosterone in dogs with differing dietary sodium intakes". Pflügers Archiv. 322 (4): 347–54. doi:10.1007/BF00587752. PMID 5100181. S2CID 1968289.
- Grekin RJ, Terris JM, Bohr DF (1980). "Electrolyte and hormonal effects of deoxycorticosterone acetate in young pigs". Hypertension. 2 (3): 326–32. doi:10.1161/01.HYP.2.3.326. PMID 6993359.
- Lieberman MA, Marks A, Peet A (2012). Marks' Basic Medical Biochemistry: A Clinical Approach. Matthew Chansky (Illustrator) (4th ed.). Lippincott Williams and Wilkins. ISBN 978-1608315727.
- Majima M, Hayashi I, Fujita T, Ito H, Nakajima S, Katori M (October 1999). "Facilitation of renal kallikrein-kinin system prevents the development of hypertension by inhibition of sodium retention". Immunopharmacology. 44 (1–2): 145–52. doi:10.1016/S0162-3109(99)00086-7. PMID 10604538.
- Merrill DC, Skelton MM, Cowley AW (June 1986). "Humoral control of water and electrolyte excretion during water restriction". Kidney International. 29 (6): 1152–61. doi:10.1038/ki.1986.121. PMID 3528610.
- Oddie CJ, Coghlan JP, Scoggins BA (June 1972). "Plasma desoxycorticosterone levels in man with simultaneous measurement of aldosterone, corticosterone, cortisol and 11-deoxycortisol". The Journal of Clinical Endocrinology and Metabolism. 34 (6): 1039–54. doi:10.1210/jcem-34-6-1039. PMID 4336456.
- O'Neil RG, Helman SI (December 1977). "Transport characteristics of renal collecting tubules: influences of DOCA and diet". The American Journal of Physiology. 233 (6): F544-58. doi:10.1152/ajprenal.1977.233.6.F544. PMID 596453.
- Pearce JW, Sonnenberg H, Veress AT, Ackermann U (April 1969). "Evidence for a humoral factor modifying the renal response to blood volume expansion in the rat". Canadian Journal of Physiology and Pharmacology. 47 (4): 377–86. doi:10.1139/y69-066. PMID 5772633.
- Peterson LN, Wright FS (September 1977). "Effect of sodium intake on renal potassium excretion". The American Journal of Physiology. 233 (3): F225-34. doi:10.1152/ajprenal.1977.233.3.F225. PMID 910918.
- Pospísilová J, Pospísil M (1970). "Influence of mineralocorticoids on collagen synthesis in subcutaneous granuloma in adrenalectomized and non-adrenalectomized mice". Physiologia Bohemoslovaca. 19 (6): 539–43. PMID 4251388.
- Rubini ME, Chojnacki RE (January 1972). "Principles of parenteral therapy". The American Journal of Clinical Nutrition. 25 (1): 96–113. doi:10.1093/ajcn/25.1.96. PMID 5007603.
- Ruch T, Fulton JF, eds. (1960). Medical Physiology and Biophysics. W. B. Saunders and Co.
- Schacht RG, Lowenstein J, Baldwin DS (October 1971). "Renal mechanism for DOCA escape in man". Bulletin of the New York Academy of Medicine. 47 (10): 1233. PMID 5286466.
- Schambelan M, Biglieri EG (April 1972). "Deoxycorticosterone production and regulation in man". The Journal of Clinical Endocrinology and Metabolism. 34 (4): 695–703. doi:10.1210/jcem-34-4-695. PMID 4335105.
- Swiss Pharmaceutical Society (2011). Index Nominum: International Drug Directory (20th ed.). Wissenschaftliche Verlag. ISBN 978-3804750531.
- Tobian L, Binion J (October 1954). "Artery wall electrolytes in renal and DCA hypertension". The Journal of Clinical Investigation. 33 (10): 1407–14. doi:10.1172/JCI103018. PMC 1072561. PMID 13201647.
- Wambach G, Higgins JR (March 1979). "Effect of progesterone on serum and tissue electrolyte concentration in doca-treated rats". Hormone and Metabolic Research. 11 (3): 258–9. doi:10.1055/s-0028-1095777. PMID 447212. S2CID 36911377.
- Wilson DL (July 1957). "Direct effects of adrenal cortical steroids on the electrolyte content of rabbit leucocytes". The American Journal of Physiology. 190 (1): 104–8. doi:10.1152/ajplegacy.1957.190.1.104. PMID 13458419.
