= Adrenal cortex =

Cortex of the adrenal gland

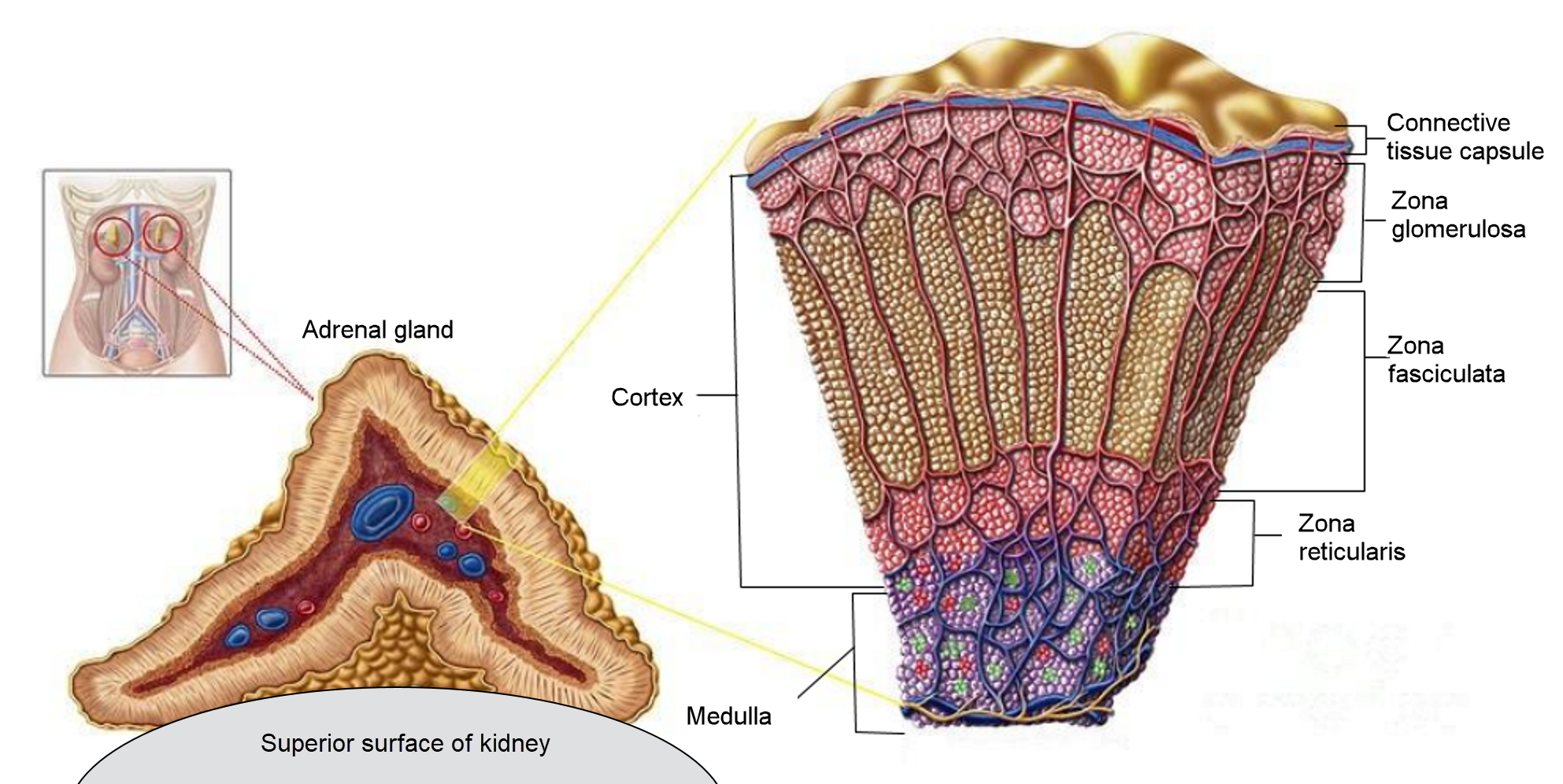
- Layers of cortex

Details
- Precursor: Mesoderm

Identifiers
- Latin: cortex glandulae suprarenalis
- MeSH: D000302
- TA98: A11.5.00.007; A13.2.03.005
- TA2: 3881
- FMA: 15632

The adrenal cortex is the outer region and also the largest part of the adrenal gland. It is divided into three separate zones: zona glomerulosa, zona fasciculata and zona reticularis. Each zone is responsible for producing specific hormones. It is also a secondary site of androgen synthesis.

== Layers ==
The adrenal cortex comprises three main zones, or layers that are regulated by distinct hormones as noted below. This anatomic zonation can be appreciated at the microscopic level, where each zone can be recognized and distinguished from one another based on structural and anatomic characteristics.

=== Zona glomerulosa ===
The outermost layer, the zona glomerulosa is the main site for the production of aldosterone, a mineralocorticoid. The synthesis and secretion of aldosterone are mainly regulated by the renin–angiotensin–aldosterone system. The zona glomerulosa cells express a specific enzyme aldosterone synthase (also known as CYP11B2). Aldosterone is largely responsible for the long-term regulation of blood pressure. Aldosterone's effects are on the distal convoluted tubule and collecting duct of the kidney where it causes increased reabsorption of sodium and increased excretion of both potassium (by principal cells) and hydrogen ions (by intercalated cells of the collecting duct). Sodium retention is also a response of the distal colon, and sweat glands to aldosterone receptor stimulation. Although sustained production of aldosterone requires persistent calcium entry through low-voltage activated Ca^{2+} channels, isolated zona glomerulosa cells are considered nonexcitable, with recorded membrane voltages that are too hyperpolarized to permit Ca^{2+} channels entry.

The secretion of aldosterone is also stimulated by adrenocorticotropic hormone (ACTH).

The cells of the zona glomerulosa do not express 11β-hydroxylase and 17α-hydroxylase. This is the reason zona glomerulosa cannot synthesize cortisol, corticosterone, or sex hormones (androgens). The expression of neuron-specific proteins in the zona glomerulosa cells of human adrenocortical tissues has been predicted and reported by several authors and it was suggested that the expression of proteins like the neuronal cell adhesion molecule (NCAM) in the cells of the zona glomerulosa reflects the regenerative feature of these cells, which would lose NCAM immunoreactivity after moving to the zona fasciculata. However, together with other data on neuroendocrine properties of zona glomerulosa cells, NCAM expression may reflect a neuroendocrine differentiation of these cells.

=== Zona fasciculata ===
Situated between the glomerulosa and reticularis, the cells of the zona fasciculata synthesize and secrete glucocorticoids (such as 11-deoxycorticosterone, corticosterone, and cortisol), as well as small amounts of adrenal androgens and estrogens. The zona fasciculata has more 3β-hydroxysteroid dehydrogenase activity than the zona reticularis. Therefore, the zona fasciculata makes more 11-deoxycorticosterone, corticosterone, and cortisol. The major hormone that stimulates cortisol secretion in humans is the ACTH that is released from the anterior pituitary. It has been shown that the steroidogenic capacity of the zona fasciculata increases during illness in infants.

=== Zona reticularis ===
The innermost cortical layer, the zona reticularis, produces adrenal androgens, as well as small amounts of estrogens and some glucocorticoids. The zona reticularis has more of the cofactors required for the 17,20-lyase activity of 17α-hydroxylase than zona fasciculata. Therefore, the zona reticularis makes more androgens, mainly dehydroepiandrosterone (DHEA), DHEA sulfate (DHEA-S), and androstenedione (the precursor to testosterone) in humans. The secretion of DHEAS is also stimulated by ACTH.

== Hormone synthesis ==
Adrenal steroid pathways

The precursor of steroids synthesized in the adrenal cortex is cholesterol that is stored in vesicles. Cholesterol can be synthesized de novo in the adrenal cortex. Yet, the major source of cholesterol appears to be cholesterol that is taken up with circulating lipoproteins.

The steps up to this point occur in many steroid-producing tissues. Subsequent steps to generate aldosterone and cortisol, however, primarily occur in the adrenal cortex:

- Progesterone → (hydroxylation at C21) → 11-Deoxycorticosterone → (two further hydroxylations at C11 and C18) → Aldosterone
- Progesterone → (hydroxylation at C17) → 17-alpha-hydroxyprogesterone → (hydroxylation at C21) → 11-Deoxycortisol → (hydroxylation at C11) → Cortisol

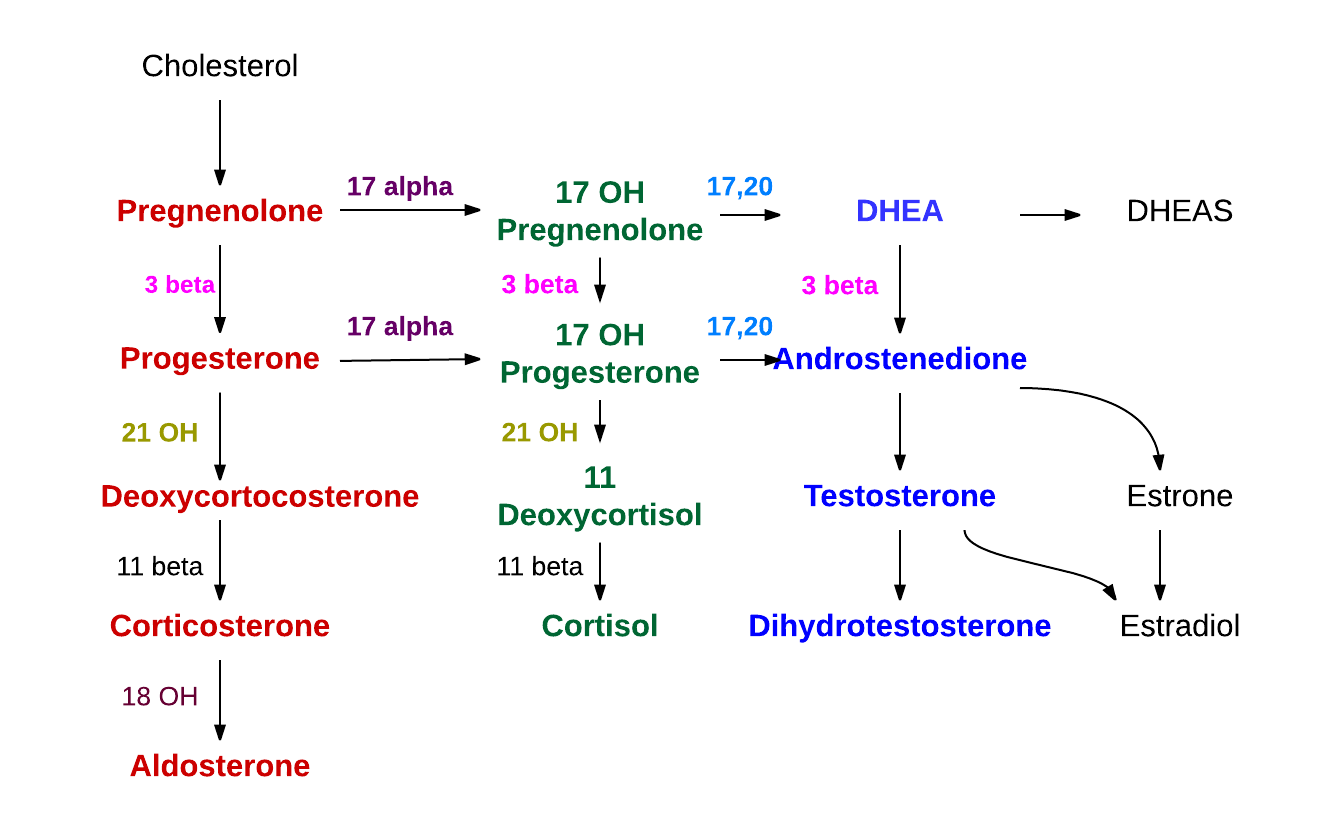
Adrenal steroid hormone synthesis steps

== Production ==
The adrenal cortex produces a number of different corticosteroid hormones.

=== Mineralocorticoids ===
The primary mineralocorticoid, aldosterone, is produced in the adrenocortical zona glomerulosa by the action of the enzyme aldosterone synthase (also known as CYP11B2). Aldosterone is largely responsible for the long-term regulation of blood pressure. Aldosterone effects on the distal convoluted tubule and collecting duct of the kidney where it causes increased reabsorption of sodium and increased excretion of both potassium (by principal cells) and hydrogen ions (by intercalated cells of the collecting duct). Sodium retention is also a response of the distal colon, and sweat glands to aldosterone receptor stimulation. Although sustained production of aldosterone requires persistent calcium entry through low-voltage activated Ca^{2+} channels, isolated zona glomerulosa cells are considered nonexcitable, with recorded membrane voltages that are too hyperpolarized to permit Ca^{2+} channels entry.

=== Glucocorticoids ===
Glucocorticoids are produced mainly in the zona fasciculata.

Glucocorticoids are steroid hormones that are necessary for life. They play a role in numerous physiological responses including; metabolism, immune response, mood, cognitive functions, cardiovascular function, and reproduction. Glucocorticoids are also widely prescribed as medication to treat numerous conditions such as autoimmune diseases and lymphoproliferative diseases. The main glucocorticoid in humans is cortisol.

=== Androgens ===
They are produced mainly in the zona reticularis. The most important androgens include:

- Testosterone: a hormone with a wide variety of effects, ranging from enhancing muscle mass and stimulation of cell growth to the development of the secondary sex characteristics.
- Dihydrotestosterone (DHT): a metabolite of testosterone, and a more potent androgen than testosterone in that it binds more strongly to androgen receptors.
- Androstenedione (Andro): an androgenic steroid produced by the testes, adrenal cortex, and ovaries. While androstenediones are converted metabolically to testosterone and other androgens, they are also the parent structure of estrone.
- Dehydroepiandrosterone (DHEA): It is the primary precursor of natural estrogens. DHEA is also called dehydroisoandrosterone or dehydroandrosterone. The reticularis also produces DHEA-sulfate due to the actions of a sulfotransferase, SULT2A1.

== Pathology ==
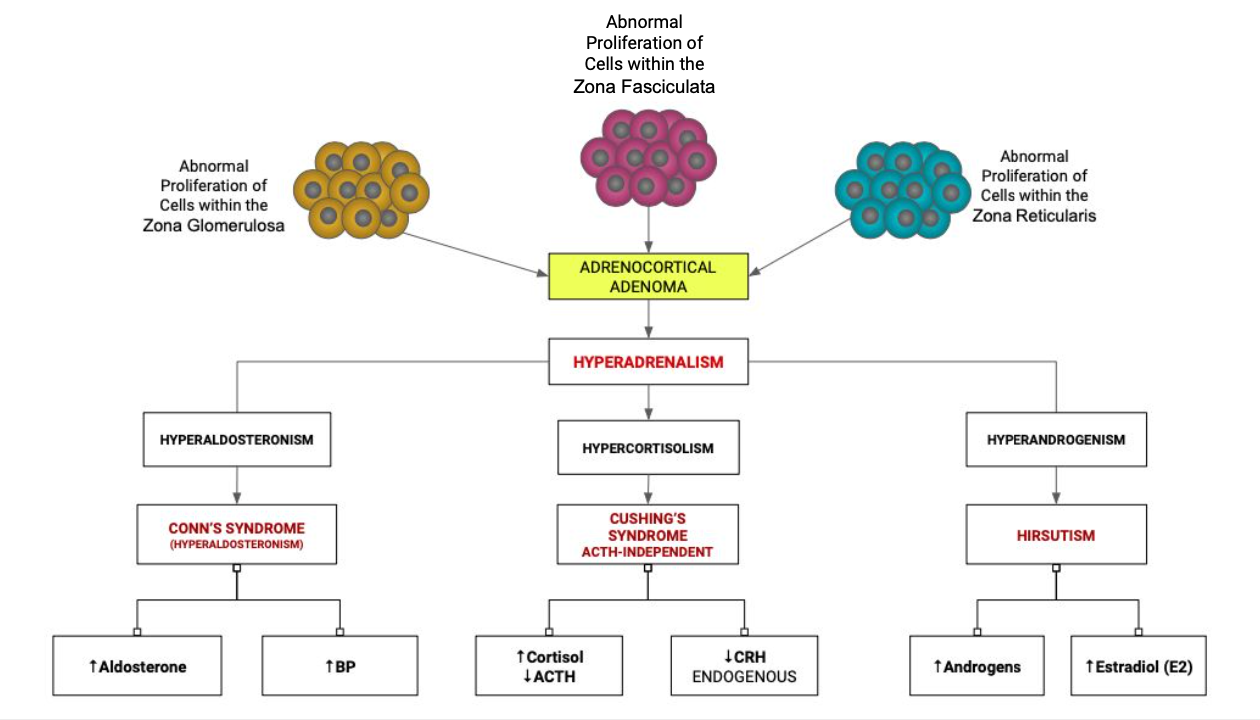
Pathology of adrenal cortex

- Adrenal insufficiency (e.g. due to Addison's disease)
- Cushing's syndrome
- Cushing's disease
- Conn's syndrome
- Adrenocortical carcinoma

== See also ==
- Adrenarche
- Adrenopause
