= Corticosterone =

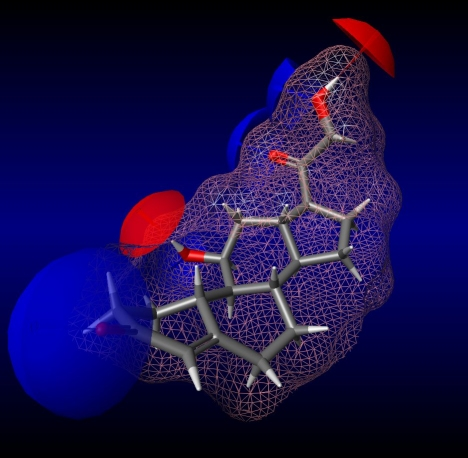

Names
- IUPAC name 11β,21-Dihydroxypregn-4-ene-3,20-dione
- Systematic IUPAC name (1S,3aS,3bS,9aR,9bS,10S,11aS)-10-Hydroxy-1-(hydroxyacetyl)-9a,11a-dimethyl-1,2,3,3a,3b,4,5,8,9,9a,9b,10,11,11a-tetradecahydro-7H-cyclopropa[a]phenanthren-7-one

Identifiers
CAS Number	50-22-6
3D model (JSmol)	Interactive image
Beilstein Reference	2339601
ChEBI	CHEBI:16827
ChEMBL	ChEMBL110739
ChemSpider	5550
DrugBank	DB04652
ECHA InfoCard	100.000.018
EC Number	200-019-6
IUPHAR/BPS	2869
KEGG	C02140
MeSH	Corticosterone
PubChem CID	5753
UNII	W980KJ009P
CompTox Dashboard (EPA)	DTXSID6022474
- InChI: InChI=1S/C21H30O4/c1-20-8-7-13(23)9-12(20)3-4-14-15-5-6-16(18(25)11-22)21(15,2)10-17(24)19(14)20/h9,14-17,19,22,24H,3-8,10-11H2,1-2H3/t14-,15-,16+,17-,19+,20-,21-/m0/s1 Key: OMFXVFTZEKFJBZ-HJTSIMOOSA-N; InChI=1/C21H30O4/c1-20-8-7-13(23)9-12(20)3-4-14-15-5-6-16(18(25)11-22)21(15,2)10-17(24)19(14)20/h9,14-17,19,22,24H,3-8,10-11H2,1-2H3/t14-,15-,16+,17-,19+,20-,21-/m0/s1 Key: OMFXVFTZEKFJBZ-HJTSIMOOBD
- SMILES: O=C4\C=C2/[C@]([C@H]1[C@@H](O)C[C@@]3([C@@H](C(=O)CO)CC[C@H]3[C@@H]1CC2)C)(C)CC4

Properties
Chemical formula	C_{21}H_{30}O_{4}
Molar mass	346.467 g·mol^{−1}

Hazards
- GHS labelling
Pictograms	(GHS07: Exclamation mark)
Signal word	Warning
Hazard statements	H317
Precautionary statements	P261, P272, P280, P302+P352, P321, P333+P313, P363, P501
- Except where otherwise noted, data are given for materials in their standard state (at 25 °C [77 °F], 100 kPa). verify (what is ?) Infobox references

Corticosterone, also known as 17-deoxycortisol and 11β,21-dihydroxyprogesterone, is a 21-carbon steroid hormone of the corticosteroid type produced in the cortex of the adrenal glands. In the very rare case of congenital adrenal hyperplasia due to 17α-hydroxylase deficiency cortisol production is blocked.

== Roles ==
In many species, including amphibians, reptiles, rodents and birds, corticosterone is a main glucocorticoid, involved in regulation of energy, immune reactions, and stress responses.

However, in humans, cortisol is the primary glucocorticoid that is produced primarily in the zona fasciculata of the adrenal cortex. Corticosterone has only weak glucocorticoid and mineralocorticoid potencies in humans and is important mainly as an intermediate in the steroidogenic pathway from pregnenolone to aldosterone. Corticosterone is converted to aldosterone by aldosterone synthase, found only in the mitochondria of glomerulosa cells. Glomerulosa cells are found in the zona glomerulosa, which is the most superficial region of endocrine cells in the adrenal cortex.

Corticosterone is the precursor molecule to the mineralocorticoid aldosterone, one of the major homeostatic modulators of sodium and potassium levels in vivo.

== Release or generation mechanisms ==
One example of a release pathway relates to UV-B stimulation on the skins of certain amphibians such as the Rough-skinned Newt, Taricha granulosa; this trigger seems to cause the internal generation of corticosterone in that species.

== Corticosterone in birds ==
A sizable amount of research has been done on the effects of corticosterone in birds. A brief survey of this research is below.

Corticosterone both inhibits protein synthesis and degrades proteins. Birds with increased levels of corticosterone will have slower feather growth during their molting period and an extended period of poor flight. As a result, many birds have reduced levels of corticosterone when they moult so as to prevent the degradation of their new feathers. Interestingly, higher levels of corticosterone are also associated with a wider range of exploration, despite beforementioned inhibited feather growth.

Corticosterone has further developmental effects on birds. Increased levels of corticosterone in chicks leads to increased begging for food and aggressiveness. In the short term this leads to higher chance of obtaining food, but in the long term, increased corticosterone in early life compromises the birds cognitive functioning (problem solving, association of visual cue with food, etc.).

Parental response to increased begging by chicks is an increased time foraging for food. This leaves the nest of chicks without protection for increased durations of time. To counter this, during extended periods of food shortage, chicks of some species may suppress corticosterone activity and thus reduce the negative effects elevated corticosterone induces.

== Effect on memory ==
Corticosterone has multiple effects on memory. The main effects are seen through the impact of stress on emotional memories as well as long term memory (LTM).

With emotional memories, corticosterone is largely associated with fear memory recognition. Studies have shown that when fear memories are reactivated or consolidated, levels of corticosterone increased. The increase in corticosterone is linked to anxiety relief. This finding depends on the time at which the administration of corticosterone took place as compared to when the fear conditioning took place; corticosterone can either facilitate or interrupt conditioned fear.

Not only does corticosterone have effects on emotional memories but memory recognition and consolidation as well. The release of corticosterone has been associated with neurogenesis under certain conditions.

With respect to recognition and long term memories, corticosterone has variable effects. Studies show that the modification of certain chemical and brain processes that affect corticosterone levels can also impact stress effects on memory. In studies on rats, the fluctuations of corticosterone concentration are shown to prevent stress' impairment of recognition memory in lower amounts. These lower levels seem to be linked to the rescue of stress-induced attenuation of CA1 long-term potentiation. When researchers looked at stress effects on LTM, they found many outcomes. In multiple studies, the formation of LTM (tested 24 h later) was found to be enhanced by corticosterone in some studies, while the persistence of LTM (tested at least 1 wk later) was only assisted by corticosterone in the late phase of memory consolidation and reconsolidation. Stress facilitates the consolidation but disrupts the reconsolidation of emotional memory. As mentioned previously, the persistence of LTM is selectively enhanced when stress and corticosterone are administered during the late phase after acquisition, but it is disrupted when stress and corticosterone are administered during the late phase after retrieval of memory. With regards to the persistence of LTM, there is a restricted time window between acquisition and retrieval where persistence is affected. These studies found that while persistence of LTM is selectively affected based on stage of memory, the formation of LTM is left intact after a certain length of time. Up to this point, studies have not agreed as to whether or not these processes are dependent on corticosterone or what even happens based on corticosterone in these processes and how memory is ultimately affected.

In the end, corticosterone affects many processes in terms of memory as well as different types of memories themselves.

== Additional images ==
Steroidogenesis

Deoxycorticosterone

Aldosterone

== See also ==
- 11-Deoxycortisol
- 11-Deoxycorticosterone
- Cortisol
