= Zona fasciculata =

Middle and widest zone of the adrenal cortex

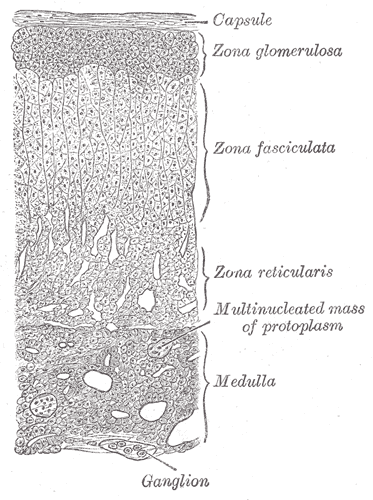
- Layers of adrenaline gland.

Details

Identifiers
- Latin: zona fasciculata
- MeSH: D015383
- FMA: 69234

The zona fasciculata (sometimes, fascicular or fasciculate zone) constitutes the middle and also the widest zone of the adrenal cortex, sitting directly beneath the zona glomerulosa. Constituent cells are organized into bundles or "fascicles".

The zona fasciculata chiefly produces glucocorticoids (mainly cortisol in humans), which regulate the metabolism of glucose. Glucocorticoid production is stimulated by adrenocorticotropic hormone (ACTH), which is released from the anterior pituitary, especially in times of stress as part of the fight-or-flight response. The zona fasciculata also generates a small amount of weak androgens (e.g., dehydroepiandrosterone). The main source of androgens will come from the zona reticularis region. In certain animals such as rodents, the lack of 17alpha-hydroxylase results in the synthesis of corticosterone instead of cortisol.

Steroid-producing adrenal tumours and hyperplasia of the zona fasciculata result in excess cortisol production and are the cause for adrenal Cushing's syndrome. The genetic disorder McCune–Albright syndrome can also present as Cushing's syndrome in affected patients.

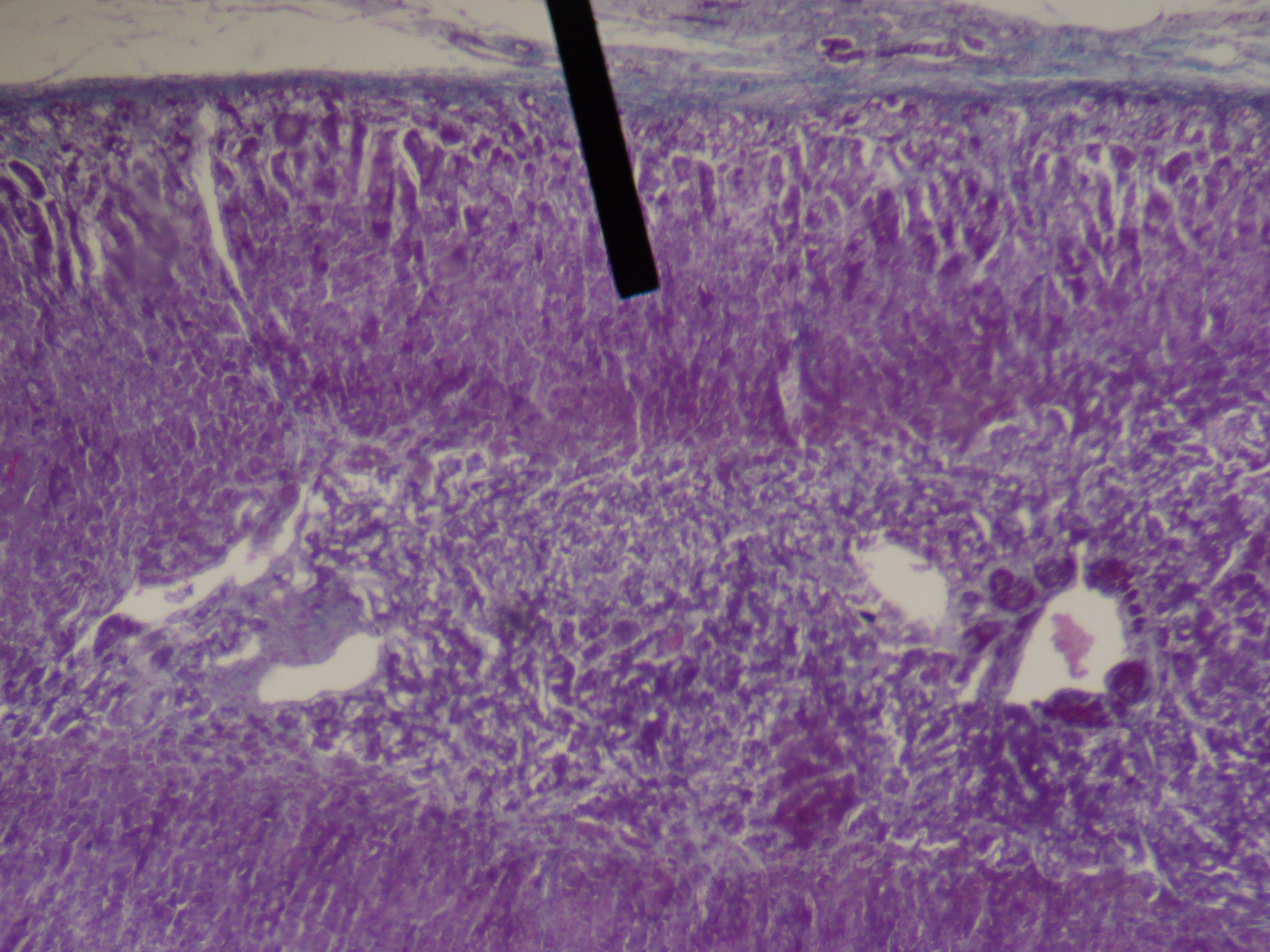
Adrenal gland (zona fasciculata layer).

== See also ==
- Spongiocyte
