= Zona glomerulosa =

Part of the adrenal gland

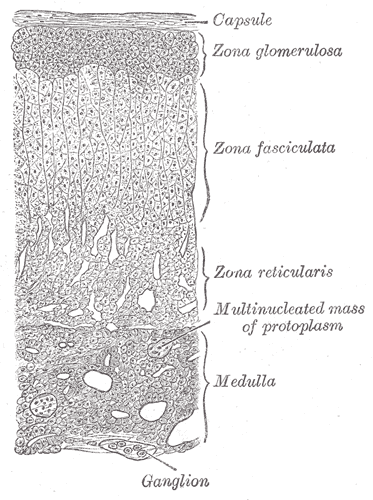
- Layers of cortex.

Details

Identifiers
- Latin: zona glomerulosa
- MeSH: D015384
- FMA: 69225

The zona glomerulosa (sometimes, glomerular zone) of the adrenal gland is the most superficial layer of the adrenal cortex, lying directly beneath the renal capsule. Its cells are ovoid and arranged in clusters or arches (glomus is Latin for "ball").

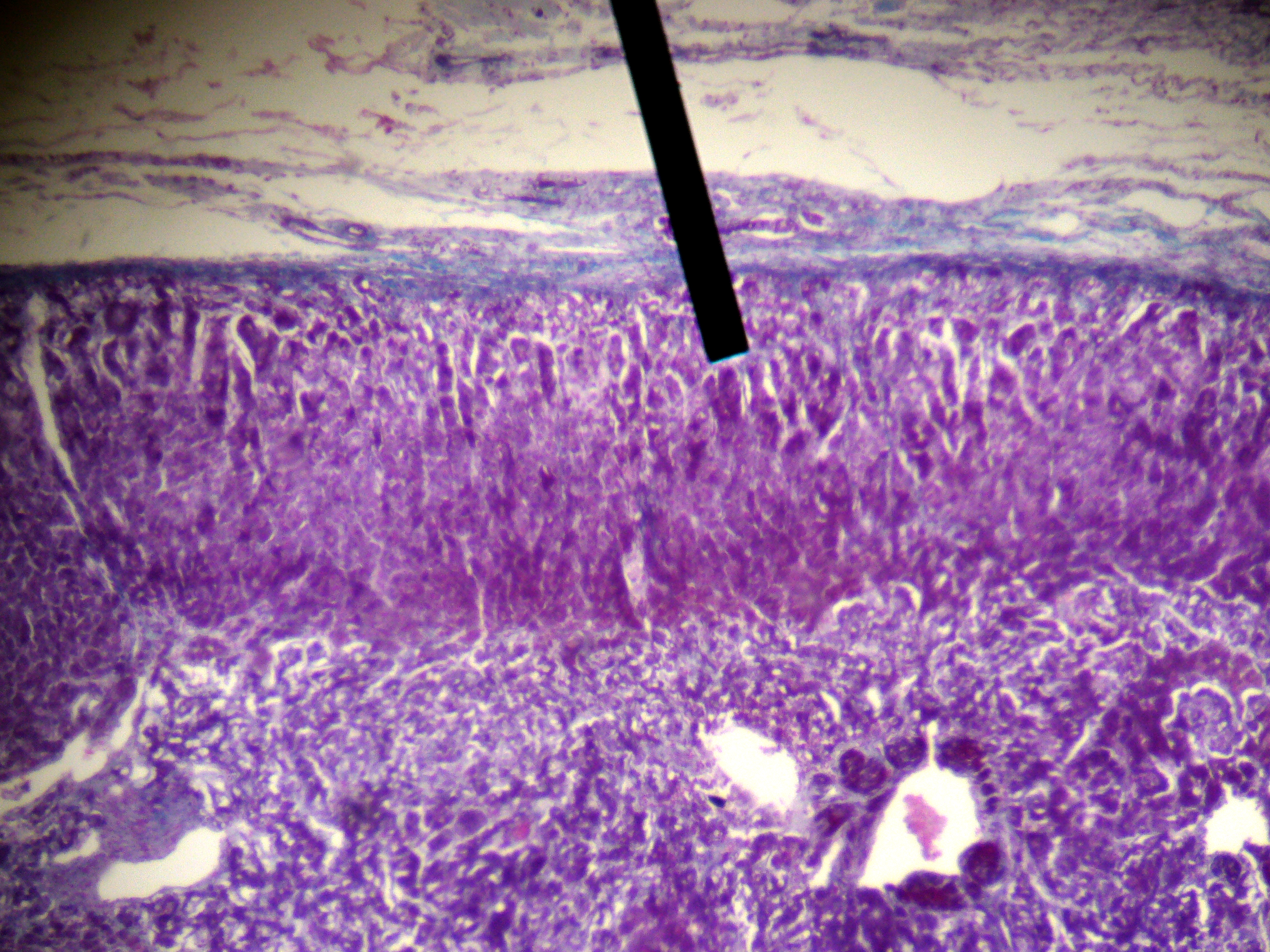
H & E staining of the adrenal cortex. The zona glomerulosa is the outermost layer, below the renal capsule (near the pointer)

In response to increased potassium levels, renin or decreased blood flow to the kidneys, cells of the zona glomerulosa produce and secrete the mineralocorticoid aldosterone into the blood as part of the renin–angiotensin system. Although sustained production of aldosterone requires persistent calcium entry through low-voltage activated Ca^{2+} channels, isolated zona glomerulosa cells are considered nonexcitable, with recorded membrane voltages that are too hyperpolarized to permit Ca^{2+} channels entry. However, mouse zona glomerulosa cells within adrenal slices spontaneously generate membrane potential oscillations of low periodicity; this innate electrical excitability of these cells provides a platform for the production of a recurrent Ca^{2+} channels signal that can be controlled by angiotensin II and extracellular potassium, the 2 major regulators of aldosterone production. Aldosterone regulates the body's concentration of electrolytes, primarily sodium and potassium, by acting on the distal convoluted tubule of kidney nephrons to: increase sodium reabsorption, increase potassium excretion, increase water reabsorption through osmosis.

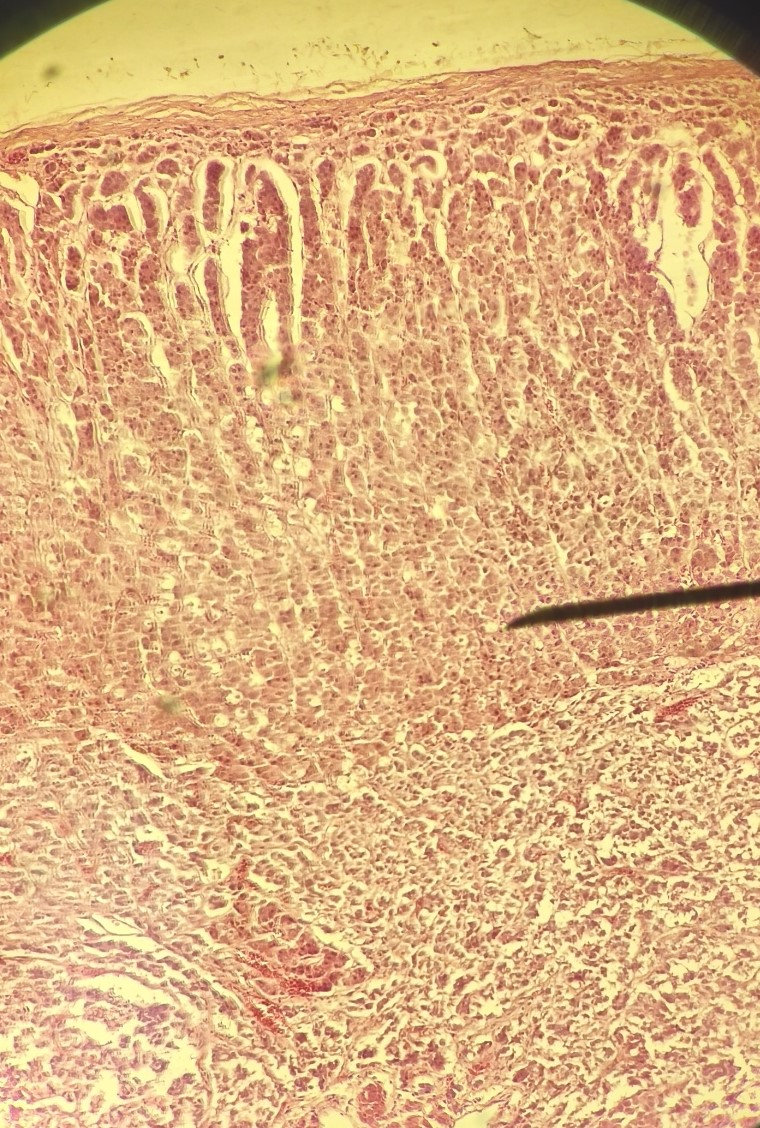
Light microscopy with H & E staining of the suprarenal gland. The zona glomerulosa layer consists of small columnar or pyramidal cells with spherical dense nucleus. The cells have mildly acidophilic cytoplasm with a few small lipid droplets.

The enzyme aldosterone synthase (also known as CYP11B2) acts in this location The expression of neuron-specific proteins in the zona glomerulosa cells of human adrenocortical tissues has been predicted and reported by several authors and it was suggested that the expression of proteins like the neuronal cell adhesion molecule (NCAM) in the cells of the zona glomerulosa reflects the regenerative feature of these cells, which would lose NCAM immunoreactivity after moving to the zona fasciculata. However, together with other data on neuroendocrine properties of zona glomerulosa cells, NCAM expression may reflect a neuroendocrine differentiation of these cells. Voltage-dependent calcium channels have been detected in the zona glomerulosa of the human adrenal, which suggests that calcium-channel blockers may directly influence the adrenocortical biosynthesis of aldosterone in vivo.
