= Cortisone =

Corticosteroid precursor and metabolite of cortisol

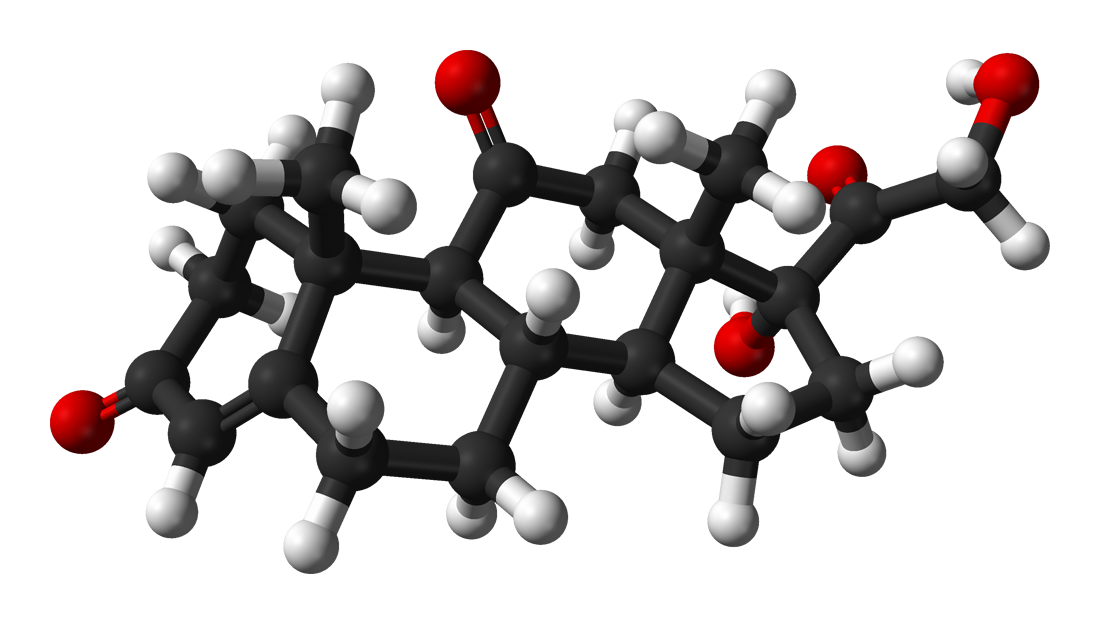

Names
Pronunciation	/ˈkɔːrtɪsoʊn/, /ˈkɔːrtɪzoʊn/
- IUPAC name 17α,21-Dihydroxypregn-4-ene-3,11,20-trione
- Systematic IUPAC name (1R,3aS,3bS,9aR,9bS,11aS)-1-Hydroxy-1-(hydroxyacetyl)-9a,11a-dimethyl-2,3,3a,3b,4,5,8,9,9a,9b,11,11a-dodecahydro-7H-cyclopenta[a]phenanthrene-7,10(1H)-dione
- Other names 17α,21-Dihydroxy-11-ketoprogesterone; 17α-Hydroxy-11-dehydrocorticosterone

Identifiers
CAS Number	53-06-5
3D model (JSmol)	Interactive image
ChEBI	CHEBI:16962
ChEMBL	ChEMBL111861
ChemSpider	193441
ECHA InfoCard	100.000.149
IUPHAR/BPS	5171
KEGG	D07749
MeSH	Cortisone
PubChem CID	222786
UNII	V27W9254FZ
CompTox Dashboard (EPA)	DTXSID5022857
- InChI: InChI=1S/C21H28O5/c1-19-7-5-13(23)9-12(19)3-4-14-15-6-8-21(26,17(25)11-22)20(15,2)10-16(24)18(14)19/h9,14-15,18,22,26H,3-8,10-11H2,1-2H3/t14-,15-,18+,19-,20-,21-/m0/s1 Key: MFYSYFVPBJMHGN-ZPOLXVRWSA-N; InChI=1/C21H28O5/c1-19-7-5-13(23)9-12(19)3-4-14-15-6-8-21(26,17(25)11-22)20(15,2)10-16(24)18(14)19/h9,14-15,18,22,26H,3-8,10-11H2,1-2H3/t14-,15-,18+,19-,20-,21-/m0/s1 Key: MFYSYFVPBJMHGN-ZPOLXVRWBW
- SMILES: O=C(CO)[C@@]3(O)CC[C@H]2[C@@H]4CC\C1=C\C(=O)CC[C@]1(C)[C@H]4C(=O)C[C@@]23C

Properties
Chemical formula	C_{21}H_{28}O_{5}
Molar mass	360.450 g·mol^{−1}
Melting point	220 to 224 °C (428 to 435 °F; 493 to 497 K)

Pharmacology
ATC code	H02AB10 (WHO) S01BA03 (WHO)
- Except where otherwise noted, data are given for materials in their standard state (at 25 °C [77 °F], 100 kPa). verify (what is ?) Infobox references

Cortisone is a naturally occurring, mostly inactive pregnene (21-carbon) steroid hormone. In the body, cortisone is produced as part of the cortisol–cortisone shunt, which protects vulnerable organs like the kidneys from cortisol. These organs produce the enzyme 11β-HSD2 which locally converts cortisol into inactive cortisone. Cortisone is later converted back into the active steroid cortisol by the enzyme 11β-HSD1, particularly in the liver, which maintains blood cortisol levels. Without the reaction converting cortisol into cortisone, cortisol binds with the mineralocorticoid receptors of the kidney, causing hypertension along with the other symptoms of apparent mineralocorticoid excess syndrome. Because it gets converted into cortisol by the body, it is sometimes used as a pharmaceutical prodrug as an alternative to directly taking cortisol.

The term "cortisone" is frequently misused to mean either any corticosteroid or hydrocortisone, which is in fact cortisol. Many who speak of receiving a "cortisone shot" or taking "cortisone" are more likely receiving hydrocortisone or one of many other, much more potent synthetic corticosteroids.

Cortisone can be administered as a prodrug, meaning it has to be converted by the body (specifically the liver, converting it into cortisol) after administration to be effective. It is used to treat a variety of ailments and can be administered intravenously, orally, intra-articularly (into a joint), or transcutaneously. Cortisone suppresses various elements of the immune system, thus reducing inflammation and attendant pain and swelling. Risks exist, in particular in the long-term use of cortisone. However, using cortisone only results in very mild activity, and very often more potent steroids are used instead.

== Medical uses ==
Cortisone itself is inactive. It must be converted to cortisol by the action of 11β-hydroxysteroid dehydrogenase type 1. This primarily happens in the liver, the main site at which cortisone becomes cortisol after oral or systemic injection, and can thus have a pharmacological effect. After application to the skin or injection into a joint, local cells that express 11β-hydroxysteroid dehydrogenase type 1 instead convert it to active cortisol.

A cortisone injection may provide short-term pain relief and may reduce the swelling from inflammation of a joint, tendon, or bursa in, for example, the joints of the knee, elbow and shoulder and into a broken coccyx.

Cortisone is used by dermatologists to treat keloids, relieve the symptoms of eczema and atopic dermatitis, and stop the development of sarcoidosis.

== Side effects ==
Oral use of cortisone has a number of potential systemic adverse effects, including asthma, hyperglycemia, insulin resistance, diabetes mellitus, osteoporosis, anxiety, depression, amenorrhoea, cataracts, glaucoma, Cushing's syndrome, increased risk of infections, and impaired growth. With topical application, it can lead to thinning of the skin, impaired wound healing, increased skin pigmentation, tendon rupture, and skin infections (including abscesses).

== Biological activity ==
Cortisone is a corticosteroid, functioning as both a glucocorticoid and mineralocorticoid. Cortisone itself is inactive and instead acts as a prodrug or prohormone of cortisol (hydrocortisone), which is responsible for its biological activity. It is metabolized into cortisol via the actions of 11β-hydroxysteroid dehydrogenase 1 (11β-HSD1). Cortisol can also be metabolized back into cortisone by the actions of 11β-hydroxysteroid dehydrogenase 2 (11β-HSD2). Through conversion into cortisol, cortisone acts indirectly as an agonist of the corticosteroid receptors, including the glucocorticoid receptor (GR) and mineralocorticoid receptor (MR). In addition, through cortisol, it acts indirectly as an agonist of membrane corticosteroid receptors, including membrane glucocorticoid receptors (mGRs) and membrane mineralocorticoid receptors (mMRs).

Cortisone has about 80% of the oral potency of hydrocortisone as both a glucocorticoid and mineralocorticoid when used clinically in humans. Relatedly, a dose of 25 mg cortisone is equivalent to about 20 mg hydrocortisone.

In addition to its corticosteroid activity, cortisone has been reported to be a highly potent negative allosteric modulator of the GABA_{A} receptor (1 pM–10 nM). This was demonstrated specifically in guinea pig ileum tissue.

== History ==
Cortisone was first identified by the American chemists Edward Calvin Kendall and Harold L. Mason while researching at the Mayo Clinic. During the discovery process, cortisone was known as compound E (while cortisol was known as compound F).

In 1949, Philip S. Hench and colleagues discovered that large doses of injected cortisone were effective in the treatment of patients with severe rheumatoid arthritis. Kendall was awarded the 1950 Nobel Prize for Physiology or Medicine along with Philip Showalter Hench and Tadeusz Reichstein for the discovery of the structure and function of adrenal cortex hormones including cortisone. Both Reichstein and the team of O. Wintersteiner and J. Pfiffner had separately isolated the compound prior to the discovery made by Mason and Kendall, but failed to recognize its biological significance. Mason's contributions to the crystallization and characterization of the compound have generally been forgotten outside of the Mayo Clinic.

Cortisone was first produced commercially by Merck & Co. in 1948 or 1949. On September 30, 1949, Percy Julian announced an improvement in the process of producing cortisone from bile acids. This eliminated the need to use osmium tetroxide, a rare, expensive, and dangerous chemical. In the UK in the early 1950s, John Cornforth and Kenneth Callow at the National Institute for Medical Research collaborated with Glaxo to produce cortisone from hecogenin from sisal plants.

== Production ==
Cortisone is one of several end-products of a process called steroidogenesis. This process starts with the synthesis of cholesterol, which then proceeds through a series of modifications in the adrenal gland to become any one of many steroid hormones. One end-product of this pathway is cortisol. For cortisol to be released from the adrenal gland, a cascade of signaling occurs. Corticotropin-releasing hormone released from the hypothalamus stimulates corticotrophs in the anterior pituitary to release ACTH, which relays the signal to the adrenal cortex. Here, the zona fasciculata and zona reticularis, in response to ACTH, secrete glucocorticoids, in particular cortisol. In various peripheral tissues, notably the kidneys, cortisol is inactivated to cortisone by the enzyme corticosteroid 11-beta-dehydrogenase isozyme 2. This is crucial because cortisol is a potent mineralocorticoid and would cause havoc with electrolyte levels (raising blood sodium and lowering blood potassium levels) and raise blood pressure if it were not inactivated in the kidneys.

Because cortisone must be converted to cortisol before being active as a glucocorticoid, its activity is less than simply administering cortisol directly (80–90%).

== Society and culture ==
=== Popular culture ===
Abuse and addiction to cortisone was the subject of the 1956 motion picture Bigger Than Life, produced by and starring James Mason. Though it was a box-office flop upon its initial release, many modern critics hail the film as a masterpiece and brilliant indictment of contemporary attitudes toward mental illness and addiction. In 1963, Jean-Luc Godard named it one of the ten greatest American sound films ever made.

John F. Kennedy was regularly administered corticosteroids such as cortisone as a treatment for Addison's disease.

== See also ==
- Central serous retinopathy
- Corticosterol

== Bibliography ==
- Bonagura J., DVM; et al. (2000). Current Veterinary Therapy. Vol. 13. pp. 321–381.
- Cossar, Harper (2011). Letterboxed: The Evolution of Widescreen Cinema. University Press of Kentucky. ISBN 978-0-813-12651-7.
- Halliwell, Martin (2013). Therapeutic Revolutions: Medicine, Psychiatry, and American Culture, 1945-1970. Rutgers University Press. ISBN 978-0-813-56066-3.
- Ingle DJ (October 1950). "The biologic properties of cortisone: a review". J. Clin. Endocrinol. Metab. 10 (10): 1312–54. doi:10.1210/jcem-10-10-1312. PMID 14794756.
- Woodward R. B.; Sondheimer F.; Taub D. (1951). "The Total Synthesis of Cortisone". Journal of the American Chemical Society. 73 (8): 4057. Bibcode:1951JAChS..73.4057W. doi:10.1021/ja01152a551.
