= 18-Oxocortisol =

Names
- IUPAC name 11β,17,21-Trihydroxy-3,20-dioxopregn-4-en-18-al
- Systematic IUPAC name (1R,3aS,3bS,9aR,9bS,10S,11aR)-1,10-Dihydroxy-1-(hydroxyacetyl)-9a-methyl-7-oxo-1,2,3,3a,3b,4,5,7,8,9,9a,9b,10,11-tetradecahydro-11aH-cyclopenta[a]phenanthrene-11a-carbaldehyde

Identifiers
| CAS Number | 2410-60-8 |
| 3D model (JSmol) | Interactive image |
| ChEBI | CHEBI:89213 |
| ChemSpider | 24840619 |
| PubChem CID | 123712 |
| CompTox Dashboard (EPA) | DTXSID001317244 |
- InChI: InChI=1S/C21H28O6/c1-19-6-4-13(24)8-12(19)2-3-14-15-5-7-21(27,17(26)10-22)20(15,11-23)9-16(25)18(14)19/h8,11,14-16,18,22,25,27H,2-7,9-10H2,1H3/t14-,15-,16-,18+,19-,20+,21-/m0/s1 Key: XUQWWIFROYJHCU-UKSDXMLSSA-N
- SMILES: C[C@]12CCC(=O)C=C1CC[C@@H]3[C@@H]2[C@H](C[C@]4([C@H]3CC[C@@]4(C(=O)CO)O)C=O)O

Properties
| Chemical formula | C_{21}H_{28}O_{6} |
| Molar mass | 376.449 g·mol^{−1} |

Related compounds
| Related compounds | 18-Hydroxycortisol |
- Except where otherwise noted, data are given for materials in their standard state (at 25 °C [77 °F], 100 kPa). Infobox references

18-Oxocortisol is an endogenous steroid, a metabolite of cortisol.

== Clinical significance ==
18-Oxocortisol has been proposed as a biomarker for certain diseases. In humans, 18-oxocortisol has no biological activity on glucocorticoid or mineralocorticoid receptors. In healthy subjects, the biosynthesis of 18-oxocortisol is low. The highest synthesis of 18-oxocortisol was found in certain cases of hypertension like in type 1 familial hyperaldosteronism (glucocorticoid-curable hyperaldosteronism) and type 3 familial hyperaldosteronism, where the adrenal glands are enlarged up to six times their normal size. Increased synthesis is also found in patients with aldosterone-producing adenomas. ACTH stimulation test increases urinary excretion of 18-oxocortisol, and dexamethasone inhibits the excretion.

The measurement of 18-oxocortisol using liquid chromatography tandem mass spectrometry has demonstrated its usefulness in distinguishing between unilateral and bilateral forms of primary aldosteronism. These measurements, along with measurements of 18-hydroxycortisol, provide a non-invasive method for diagnosing and classifying different subtypes of PA, potentially reducing the need for more invasive procedures like adrenal vein sampling. In aldosterone-producing adrenocortical adenoma (APA), which is the main cause of primary aldosteronism, the enzyme aldosterone synthase (CYP11B2) is required for aldosterone production. Somatic mutations in genes like KCNJ5 and CACNA1D can lead to an overexpression of CYP11B2 and increased production of aldosterone. CYP11B2 catalyzes the conversion of cortisol to 18-hydroxycortisol and then further converts it into 18-oxocortisol, making 18-oxocortisol a significant biomarker for diagnosing primary aldosteronism.

== Biosynthesis ==
In patients with familial hyperaldosteronism type 1, there is a genetic crossover between specific regions of the CYP11B1 and CYP11B2 genes. This crossover results in the expression of an additional gene in the zona fasciculata, which is regulated by ACTH. The additional gene plays a role in synthesizing 18-oxocortisol by attaching the oxo (=O) functional group to carbon 18 of the steroid nucleus of cortisol. This additional gene also plays a role in the biosynthesis of aldosterone and 18-hydroxycortisol.

== See also ==
- Cortisol
- 18-Hydroxycortisol
- 18-Hydroxycorticosterone
- Aldosterone synthase
- Steroid 11β-hydroxylase
- 6β-Hydroxycortisol
