= RU-28362 =

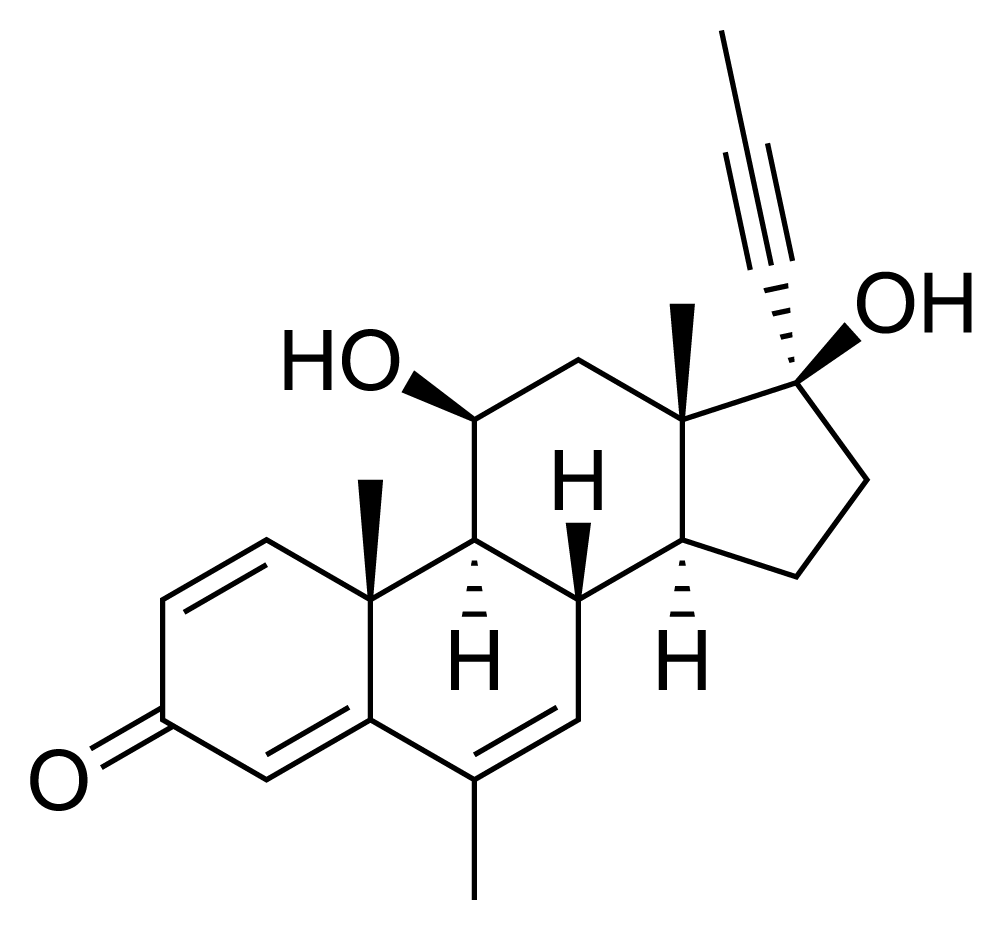

Names
- IUPAC name 11β,17β-Dihydroxy-6-methyl-17α-(prop-1-yn-1-yl)androsta-1,4,6-trien-3-one
- Systematic IUPAC name (1S,3aS,3bS,9aR,9bS,10S,11aS)-1,10-Dihydroxy-5,9a,11a-trimethyl-1-(prop-1-yn-1-yl)-1,2,3,3a,3b,9a,9b,10,11,11a-decahydro-7H-cyclopenta[a]phenanthren-7-one

Identifiers
CAS Number	74915-64-3
3D model (JSmol)	Interactive image
ChemSpider	110341
IUPHAR/BPS	3445
PubChem CID	123790
UNII	VH397CN9SV
CompTox Dashboard (EPA)	DTXSID101027141
- InChI: InChI=1S/C23H28O3/c1-5-8-23(26)10-7-17-16-11-14(2)18-12-15(24)6-9-21(18,3)20(16)19(25)13-22(17,23)4/h6,9,11-12,16-17,19-20,25-26H,7,10,13H2,1-4H3/t16-,17-,19-,20+,21-,22-,23-/m0/s1 Key: UFZKDKHLKHEFGA-ZFTCBNFESA-N; InChI=1S/C23H28O3/c1-5-8-23(26)10-7-17-16-11-14(2)18-12-15(24)6-9-21(18,3)20(16)19(25)13-22(17,23)4/h6,9,11-12,16-17,19-20,25-26H,7,10,13H2,1-4H3/t16-,17-,19-,20+,21-,22-,23-/m0/s1 Key: UFZKDKHLKHEFGA-ZFTCBNFESA-N; InChI=1/C23H28O3/c1-5-8-23(26)10-7-17-16-11-14(2)18-12-15(24)6-9-21(18,3)20(16)19(25)13-22(17,23)4/h6,9,11-12,16-17,19-20,25-26H,7,10,13H2,1-4H3/t16-,17-,19-,20+,21-,22-,23-/m0/s1 Key: UFZKDKHLKHEFGA-ZFTCBNFEBV
- SMILES: CC#C[C@@]1(CC[C@@H]2[C@@]1(C[C@@H]([C@H]3[C@H]2C=C(C4=CC(=O)C=C[C@]34C)C)O)C)O

Properties
Chemical formula	C_{23}H_{28}O_{3}
Molar mass	352.474 g·mol^{−1}
- Except where otherwise noted, data are given for materials in their standard state (at 25 °C [77 °F], 100 kPa). Infobox references

RU-28362 is a synthetic androstane glucocorticoid that was developed by Roussel Uclaf. It is a selective agonist of the glucocorticoid receptor (corticoid type II receptor), but not of the mineralocorticoid receptor (corticoid type I receptor).

A similar compound is dexamethasone that also selectively binds to the glucocorticoid receptor with high affinity. This is in contrast to the natural steroid hormones cortisol or corticosterone, which bind to both of the corticosteroid receptors, though they bind to the mineralocorticoid receptor with greater affinity.

== See also ==
- Fluoxymesterone
