= C21H28O6 =

The molecular formula C_{21}H_{28}O_{6} (molar mass: 376.44 g/mol, exact mass: 376.1886 u) may refer to:

- Bis-HPPP, or 2,2-Bis[4(2,3-hydroxypropoxy)phenyl]propane
- 18-Oxocortisol
- Oxisopred
