= 18-Hydroxycortisol =

Names
- IUPAC name 11β,17,18,21-Tetrahydroxypregn-4-ene-3,20-dione
- Systematic IUPAC name (1S,3aS,3bS,9aR,9bS,10S,11aS)-1,10-Dihydroxy-1-(hydroxyacetyl)-11a-(hydroxymethyl)-9a-methyl-1,2,3,3a,3b,4,5,8,9,9a,9b,10,11,11a-tetradecahydro-7H-cyclopenta[a]phenanthren-7-one

Identifiers
CAS Number	144302-17-0; 86002-90-6 (non-specific)
3D model (JSmol)	Interactive image
ChEBI	CHEBI:89455
ChemSpider	17215950
PubChem CID	102029
UNII	T8YUY43659
- InChI: InChI=1S/C21H30O6/c1-19-6-4-13(24)8-12(19)2-3-14-15-5-7-21(27,17(26)10-22)20(15,11-23)9-16(25)18(14)19/h8,14-16,18,22-23,25,27H,2-7,9-11H2,1H3/t14-,15-,16-,18+,19-,20+,21+/m0/s1
- SMILES: C1(=O)CC[C@@]2([C@]3([C@H](C[C@@]4([C@@](CC[C@]4([C@@]3(CCC2=C1)[H])[H])(C(=O)CO)O)CO)O)[H])C

Properties
Chemical formula	C_{21}H_{30}O_{6}
Molar mass	378.465 g·mol^{−1}

Related compounds
Related compounds	18-Oxocortisol
- Except where otherwise noted, data are given for materials in their standard state (at 25 °C [77 °F], 100 kPa). Infobox references

18-Hydroxycortisol is an endogenous steroid, a metabolite of cortisol.

== Clinical significance ==
18-hydroxycortisol has been proposed as a biomarker for certain diseases. In humans, 18-hydroxycortisol has no biological activity on glucocorticoid or mineralocorticoid receptors. In healthy subjects, the biosynthesis of 18-hydroxycortisol is low. The highest synthesis of 18-hydroxycortisol was found in certain cases of hypertension like in type 1 familial hyperaldosteronism (glucocorticoid-curable hyperaldosteronism) and type 3 familial hyperaldosteronism, where the adrenal glands are enlarged up to six times their normal size. Increased synthesis is also found in patients with aldosterone-producing adenomas. ACTH stimulation test increases urinary excretion of 18-hydroxycortisol, and dexamethasone inhibits the excretion.

== Biosynthesis ==
In patients with familial hyperaldosteronism type 1, there is a genetic crossover between specific regions of the CYP11B1 and CYP11B2 genes. This crossover results in the expression of an additional gene in the zona fasciculata, which is regulated by ACTH. The additional gene plays a role in synthesizing 18-hydroxycortisol by 18-hydroxylation of cortisol. This gene also plays a role in the biosynthesis of aldosterone and 18-oxocortisol.

== See also ==
- Cortisol
- 18-Hydroxycorticosterone
- 18-Oxocortisol
- Aldosterone synthase
- Steroid 11β-hydroxylase
- 6β-Hydroxycortisol
