= C24H29FO4 =

The molecular formula C_{24}H_{29}FO_{4} (molar mass: 400.49 g/mol) may refer to:

- DU-41164
- DU-41165, or 6-fluoro-16-methylene-17α-acetoxy-δ^{6}-retroprogesterone
