= Corticosteroid receptor =

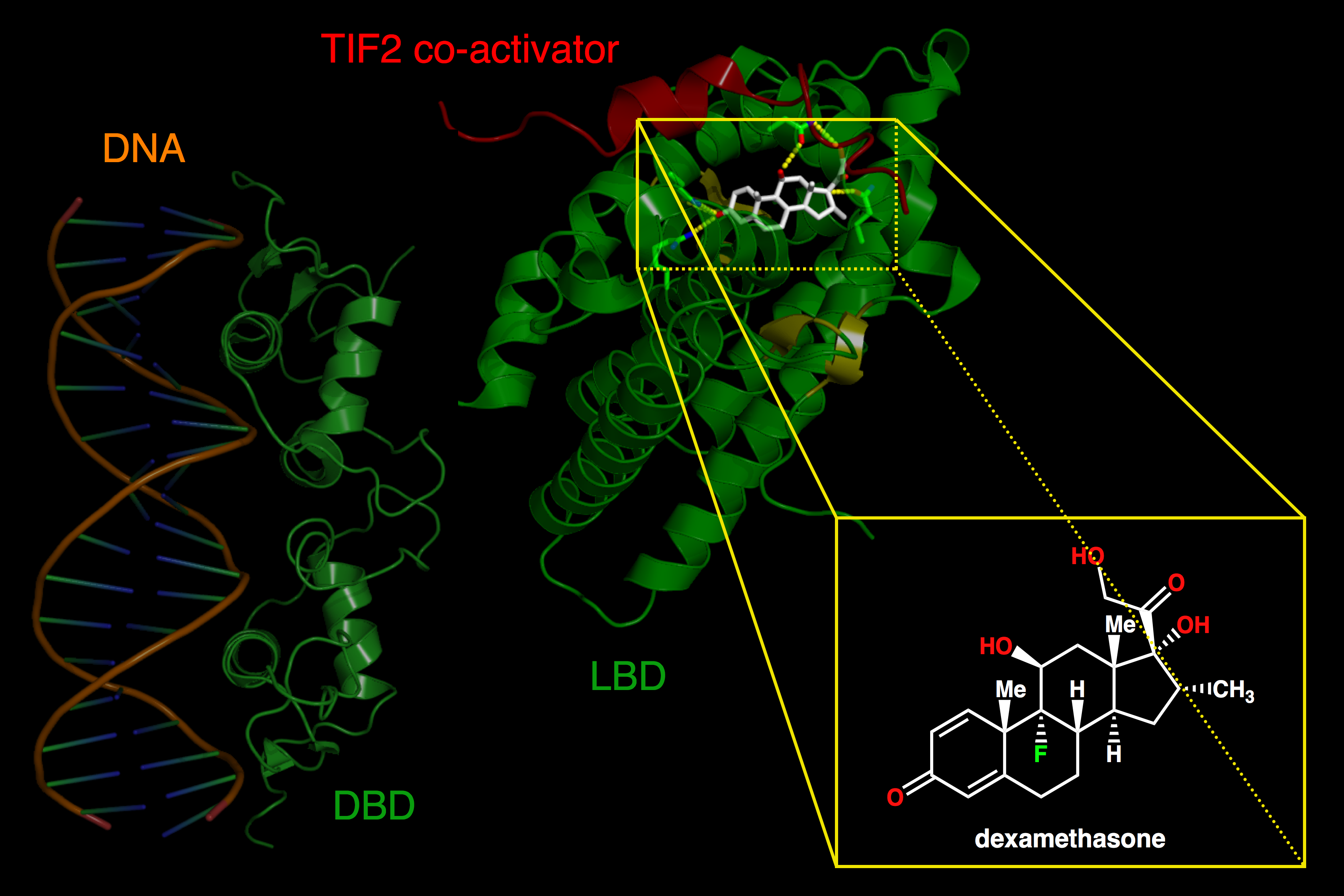
The glucocorticoid receptor.

The corticosteroid receptors are receptors for corticosteroids. Corticosteroid receptors mediate the target organ response to the major products of the adrenal cortex, glucocorticoids (principally cortisol in man), and mineralocorticoids (principally aldosterone). They are members of the intracellular receptor superfamily which is highly evolutionarily conserved, and includes receptors for thyroid hormones, vitamin D, sex steroids, and retinoids. They include the following two nuclear receptors:

- Glucocorticoid receptor (type I) – glucocorticoids like cortisol
- Mineralocorticoid receptor (type I) – mineralocorticoids like aldosterone

There are also membrane corticosteroid receptors, including the membrane glucocorticoid receptors and the membrane mineralocorticoid receptors, which are not well-characterized at present.
