= DU-41165 =

Chemical compound

Clinical data
- Other names: 6-Fluoro-16-methylene-17α-acetoxy-δ^{6}-retroprogesterone; 6-Fluoro-16-methylene-17α-hydroxy-9β,10α-pregna-4,6-diene-3,20-dione 17α-acetate; 6-Fluoro-16-methylene-3,20-dioxo-9β,10α-pregna-4,6-dien-17α-yl acetate
- Routes of administration: By mouth
- Drug class: Progestin; Progestogen

Identifiers
- IUPAC name: [(8R,9R,10S,13S,14S,17R)-17-Acetyl-6-fluoro-10,13-dimethyl-16-methylidene-3-oxo-1,2,8,9,11,12,14,15-octahydrocyclopenta[a]phenanthren-17-yl] acetate
- CAS Number: 34184-58-2
- PubChem CID: 169573
- ChemSpider: 148298
- UNII: 5M4PL394K5
- CompTox Dashboard (EPA): DTXSID60955729

Chemical and physical data
- Formula: C_{24}H_{29}FO_{4}
- Molar mass: 400.490 g·mol^{−1}
- 3D model (JSmol): Interactive image
- SMILES: CC(=O)[C@]1(C(=C)C[C@@H]2[C@@]1(CC[C@@H]3[C@H]2C=C(C4=CC(=O)CC[C@@]34C)F)C)OC(=O)C
- InChI: InChI=1S/C24H29FO4/c1-13-10-19-17-12-21(25)20-11-16(28)6-8-22(20,4)18(17)7-9-23(19,5)24(13,14(2)26)29-15(3)27/h11-12,17-19H,1,6-10H2,2-5H3/t17-,18-,19+,22+,23+,24+/m1/s1; Key:XSSIGSNQDKHHLD-JBARXXBASA-N

DU-41165, also known as 6-fluoro-16-methylene-17α-acetoxy-δ^{6}-retroprogesterone, is a progestin which was developed by Philips-Duphar in the 1970s and was never marketed. It is a combined derivative of 17α-hydroxyprogesterone and retroprogesterone. The drug shows extremely high potency as a progestogen in animals. It has been found to possess 158% of the relative binding affinity of promegestone for the progesterone receptor expressed in rat uterus (relative to 74% for the closely related progestin DU-41164). DU-41165 also showed 28% of the affinity of RU-28362 for the glucocorticoid receptor expressed in rat liver, but no affinity for the mineralocorticoid receptor expressed in rat kidney (<0.003% of that of RU-26752). The drug showed no androgenic, anabolic, or estrogenic activity in animals, but did show some antiandrogenic and glucocorticoid activity at high doses. Although highly potent in animals, DU-41165 produced little or no progestogenic effect at dosages of 50 and 200 μg/day in women, suggesting major species differences. DU-41165 has been studied as a potential photoaffinity label for the progesterone receptor.
