= Edward Calvin Kendall =

American biochemist (1886–1972)

- Kendall in 1950
- Born: March 8, 1886; South Norwalk, Connecticut, United States
- Died: May 4, 1972 (aged 86); Princeton, New Jersey, United States
- Education: Columbia University
- Known for: Isolation of thyroxine Discovery of cortisone
- Awards: Lasker Award (1949); Passano Foundation (1950); Nobel Prize in Physiology or Medicine (1950); Cameron Prize for Therapeutics of the University of Edinburgh (1951)
- Scientific career
- Fields: Biochemistry
- Workplaces: Parke-Davis; St. Luke's Hospital; Mayo Clinic; Princeton University

Edward Calvin Kendall (March 8, 1886 – May 4, 1972) was an American biochemist. In 1950, Kendall was awarded the Nobel Prize for Physiology or Medicine along with Swiss chemist Tadeusz Reichstein and Mayo Clinic physician Philip S. Hench, for their work with the hormones of the adrenal glands. Kendall not only researched the adrenal glands, he also isolated thyroxine, a hormone of the thyroid gland and worked with the team that crystallized glutathione and identified its chemical structure.

Kendall was a biochemist at the Graduate School of the Mayo Foundation at the time of the Nobel award. He received his education at Columbia University. After retiring from his job with the Mayo Foundation, Kendall joined the faculty at Princeton University, where he remained until his death in 1972. Kendall Elementary School, in Norwalk is named for him.

== Early life and education ==
Kendall was born in South Norwalk, Connecticut in 1886. He attended Columbia University, earning a Bachelor of Science degree in 1908, a Master of Science degree in Chemistry in 1909, and a Ph.D. in Chemistry in 1910.

== Research career ==
After obtaining his Ph.D., his first job was in research for Parke, Davis and Company, and his first task was to isolate the hormone associated with the thyroid gland. He continued this research at St. Luke's Hospital in New York until 1914. He was appointed Head of the Biochemistry Section in the Graduate School of the Mayo Foundation, and the following year he was appointed as the Director of the Division of Biochemistry.

Kendall made several significant contributions to biochemistry and medicine. His most important discovery was the isolation of thyroxine, although it was not the work for which he received the most accolades. Along with associates, Kendall was involved with the isolation of glutathione and determining its structure. He also isolated several steroids from the adrenal gland cortex, one of which was initially called Compound E. Working with Mayo Clinic physician Philip Showalter Hench, Compound E was used to treat rheumatoid arthritis. The compound was eventually named cortisone. In 1950, Kendall and Hench, along with Swiss chemist Tadeus Reichstein were awarded the 1950 Nobel Prize in Physiology or Medicine for "their discoveries relating to the hormones of the adrenal cortex, their structure and biological effects." His Nobel lecture focused on the basic research that led to his award, and was titled "The Development of Cortisone As a Therapeutic Agent." As of the 2010 awards, Kendall and Hench were the only Nobel Laureates to be affiliated with Mayo Clinic.

Kendall was elected to the United States National Academy of Sciences in 1950, and both the American Academy of Arts and Sciences and the American Philosophical Society in 1951.

Kendall's career at Mayo ended in 1951, when he reached mandatory retirement age. He moved on to Princeton University, where he was a visiting professor in the Department of Biochemistry. He remained affiliated with Princeton until his death in 1972. In addition to the Nobel Prize, Kendall received other major awards including the Lasker Award, the Passano Foundation Award and the Cameron Prize for Therapeutics of the University of Edinburgh. Kendall received the Golden Plate Award of the American Academy of Achievement in 1966. He was awarded honorary doctorates from the University of Cincinnati, Western Reserve University, Williams College, Yale University, Columbia University, National University of Ireland, and Gustavus Adolphus College.

== Family life ==
Kendall married Rebecca Kennedy in 1915, and they had four children. He died in 1972 in Princeton, New Jersey. His wife died in 1973.
