= Dexamethasone-BSA =

Clinical data
- Other names: Dexamethasone-bovine serum albumin conjugate; BSA-dexamethasone; Dex-BSA
- Drug class: Corticosteroid; Glucocorticoid
- ATC code: None

Dexamethasone-BSA, also known as dexamethasone-bovine serum albumin conjugate, is a conjugate of the corticosteroid dexamethasone and the serum albumin bovine serum albumin (BSA). It is a membrane-limited glucocorticoid that is unable to diffuse into cells and can dissociate rapid membrane-mediated glucocorticoid receptor effects from intracellular or genomic effects. The drug is used in scientific research to study the actions of membrane glucocorticoid receptors.
