= Tadeusz Reichstein =

Polish-Swiss chemist (1897–1996)

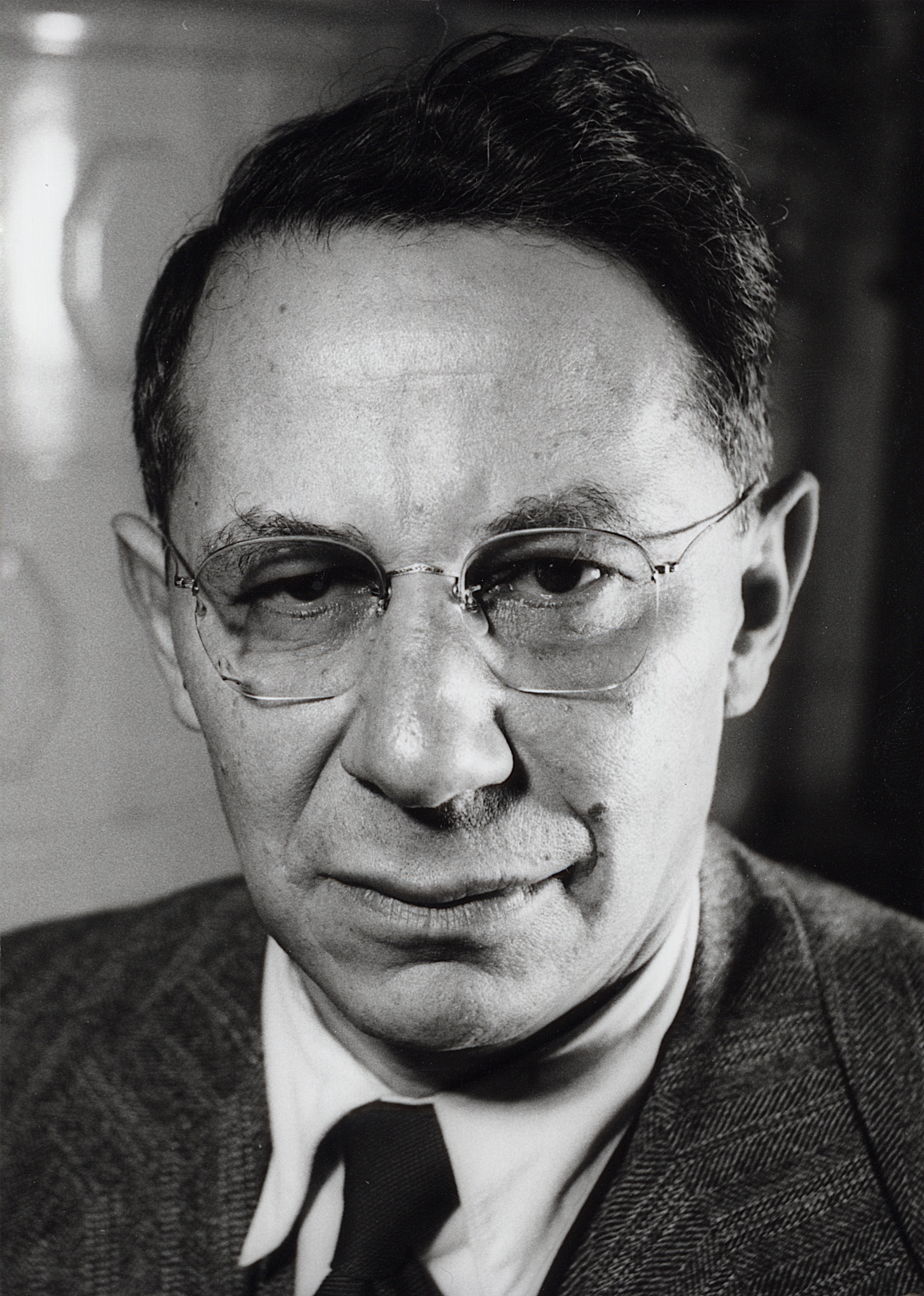
- Born: 20 July 1897; Włocławek, Congress Poland, Russian Empire
- Died: 1 August 1996 (aged 99); Basel, Switzerland
- Citizenship: Poland, Switzerland
- Known for: cortisone
- Spouse: Henriette Louise Quarles van Ufford (m. 1927; 1 child)
- Children: Margrit Rosset (from an earlier relationship), Ruth Reichstein (1933-1989)
- Awards: Marcel Benoist Prize (1947); Nobel Prize in Physiology or Medicine (1950); Cameron Prize for Therapeutics of the University of Edinburgh (1951); Centenary Prize (1952); Copley Medal (1968)

Tadeusz Reichstein (20 July 1897 – 1 August 1996), also known as Tadeus Reichstein, was a Polish-Swiss chemist and a Nobel Prize in Physiology or Medicine laureate (1950), which was awarded for his work on the isolation of cortisone.

== Early life ==
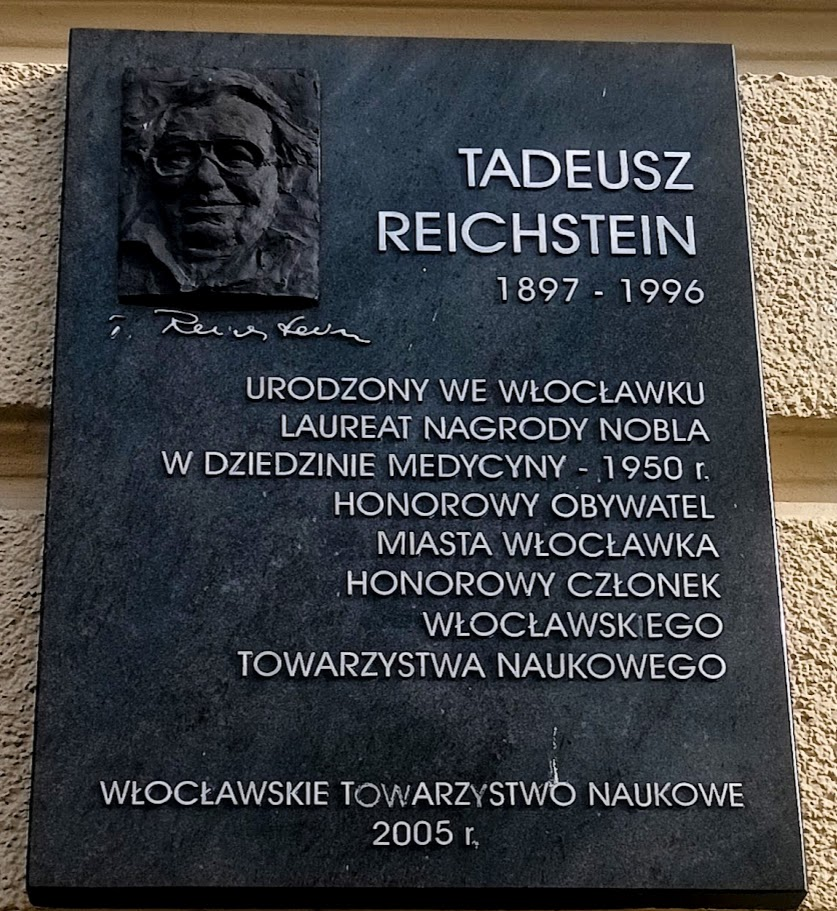
Memorial plaque in Włocławek, Poland

Reichstein was born on 20 July 1897 into a wealthy Polish-Jewish family with strong Polish patriotic traditions at Włocławek, Russian Empire (in the Russian Partition of Poland). His parents were Gastawa (Brockmann) and Izydor Reichstein. He was named after the 18th-century Polish national hero Tadeusz Kościuszko. He spent his early childhood at Kiev, where his father was an engineer. Due to the violent pogroms occurring all over the Russian Empire in 1905, his father began to explore emigration options for the family. Tadeus began his education at a boarding school in Jena, Germany and arrived in Zürich, Switzerland two years later (1907) at the age of 10.

== Career ==
Reichstein studied under Hermann Staudinger during the latter's brief stint at the Technical University of Karlsruhe. It was here that he met Leopold Ruzicka, also a doctoral student.

In 1933, working in Zürich, Switzerland, at the ETHZ chemical laboratories of Ruzicka, Reichstein succeeded, independently of Sir Norman Haworth and his collaborators in the United Kingdom, in synthesizing vitamin C (ascorbic acid) in what is now called the Reichstein process. In 1937, he was appointed Associate Professor at ETHZ.

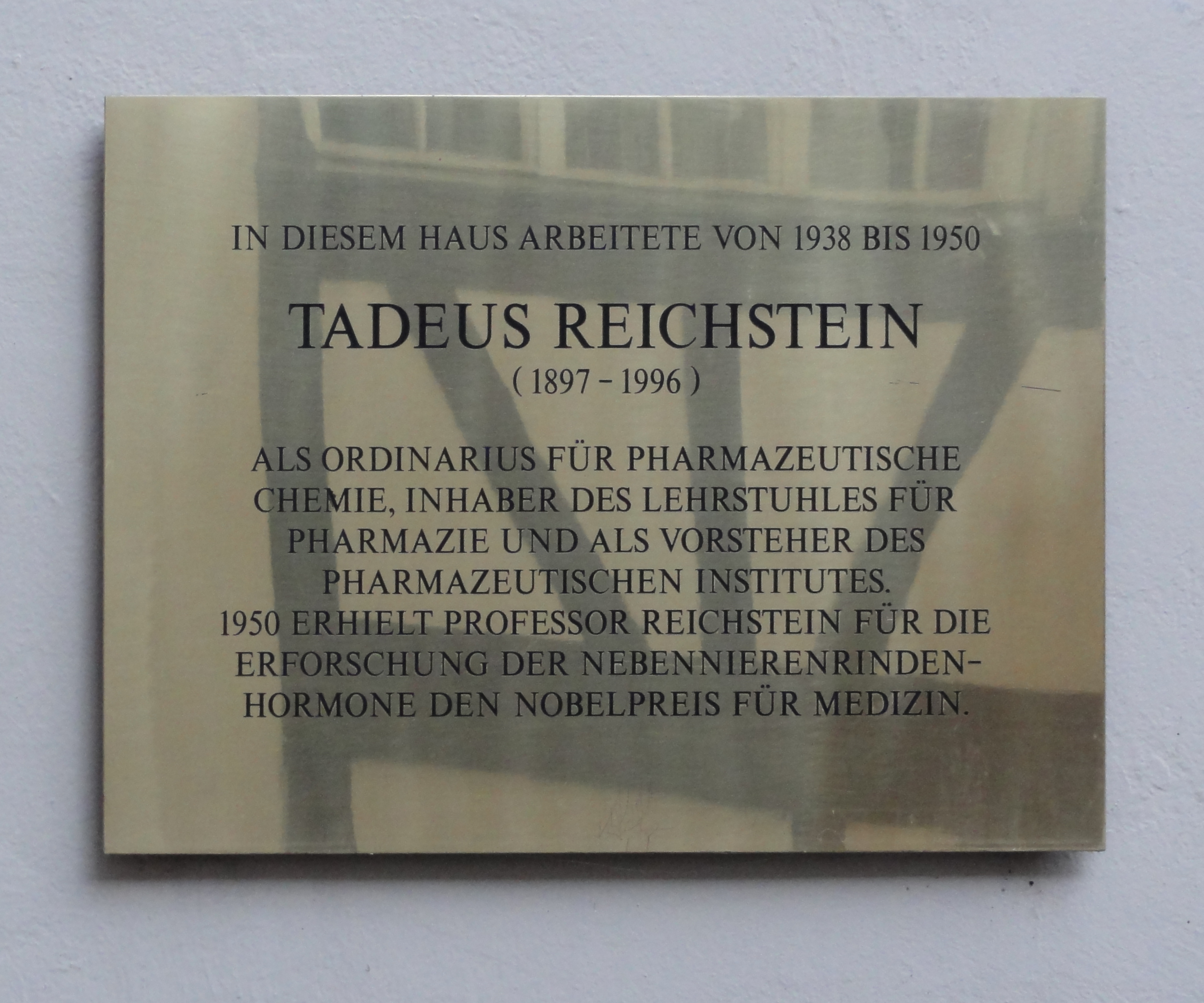
Memorial plaque at Reichstein's house in Basel, Switzerland

In 1937, Reichstein moved to the University of Basel where he became Professor of Pharmaceutical Chemistry, and then, from 1946 until his retirement in 1967, of Organic Chemistry.

Together with Edward Calvin Kendall and Philip Showalter Hench, he was awarded the Nobel Prize in Physiology or Medicine in 1950 for their work on hormones of the adrenal cortex which culminated in the isolation of cortisone. In 1951, he and Kendall were jointly awarded the Cameron Prize for Therapeutics of the University of Edinburgh.

In later years, Reichstein became interested in the phytochemistry and cytology of ferns, publishing at least 80 papers on these subjects in the last three decades of his life. He had a particular interest in the use of chromosome number and behavior in the interpretation of histories of hybridization and polyploidy, but also continued his earlier interest in the chemical constituents of the plants.

== Retirement and death ==
Reichstein died at the age of 99 on 1 August 1996 in Basel, Switzerland. The principal industrial process for the artificial synthesis of vitamin C still bears his name. Reichstein was the longest-lived Nobel laureate at the time of his death, but was surpassed in 2008 by Rita Levi-Montalcini.

== See also ==
- List of Jewish Nobel laureates
- List of Polish Nobel laureates
