= Philip Showalter Hench =

American physician (1896–1965)

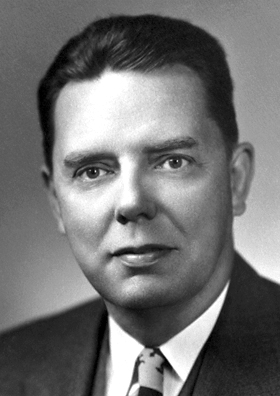
- Hench in 1950
- Born: February 28, 1896; Pittsburgh, Pennsylvania, USA
- Died: March 30, 1965 (aged 69); Ocho Rios, Jamaica
- Education: Lafayette College; University of Pittsburgh
- Known for: Discovery of cortisone
- Awards: Nobel Prize in Physiology or Medicine (1950)
- Scientific career
- Fields: Medicine
- Workplaces: Mayo Clinic

Signature
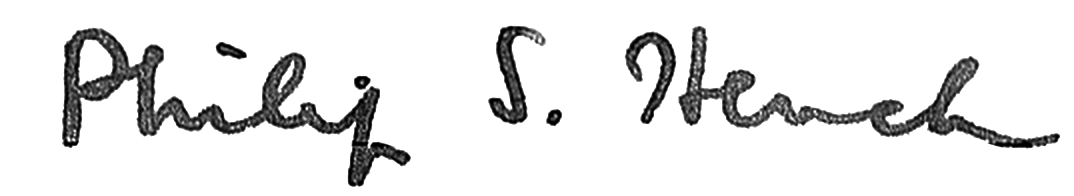

Philip Showalter Hench (February 28, 1896 – March 30, 1965) was an American physician. Hench, along with his Mayo Clinic co-worker Edward Calvin Kendall and Swiss chemist Tadeus Reichstein was awarded the Nobel Prize for Physiology or Medicine in 1950 for the discovery of the hormone cortisone, and its application for the treatment of rheumatoid arthritis. The Nobel Committee bestowed the award for the trio's "discoveries relating to the hormones of the adrenal cortex, their structure and biological effects."

Hench received his undergraduate education at Lafayette College in Easton, Pennsylvania, and received his medical training at the United States Army Medical Corps and the University of Pittsburgh. He began working at Mayo Clinic in 1923, later serving as the head of the Department of Rheumatology. In addition to the Nobel Prize, Hench received many other awards and honors throughout his career. He also had a lifelong interest in the history and discovery of yellow fever.

== Early life ==
He attended Lafayette College in Easton, Pennsylvania, where he obtained his Bachelor of Arts in 1916. After serving in the Medical Corps of the U.S. Army and the reserve corps to finish his medical training, he was awarded a doctorate in medicine from the University of Pittsburgh in 1920. Immediately after finishing his medical degree, Hench spent a year as an intern at St. Francis Hospital in Pittsburgh, and then he subsequently became a Fellow of the Mayo Foundation.

In 1928 and 1929, Hench furthered his education at Freiburg University and the von Müller Clinic in Munich.

== Medical career ==
Hench started his career at Mayo Clinic in 1923, working in the Department of Rheumatic Diseases. In 1926, he became the head of the department. While at Mayo Clinic, Hench focused his work on arthritic diseases, where his observations led him to hypothesize that steroids alleviated pain associated with the disease. During this same time, biochemist Edward Calvin Kendall has isolated several steroids from the adrenal gland cortex. After several years of work, the duo decided to try one of these steroids (dubbed Compound E at the time, later to become known as cortisone) on patients afflicted by rheumatoid arthritis. Testing of the hypothesis was delayed because the synthesis of Compound E was costly and time-consuming, and Hench served in the military during World War II. The tests were conducted successfully in 1948 and 1949.

Hench's Nobel Prize

Hench, Kendall, and Swiss chemist Tadeus Reichstein were awarded the 1950 Nobel Prize in Physiology or Medicine "for their discoveries relating to the hormones of the adrenal cortex, their structure and biological effects." As of the 2010 prizes, Hench and Kendall are the only two Nobel laureates affiliated with Mayo Clinic. Hench's Nobel Lecture was directly related to the research he was honored for, and titled "The Reversibility of Certain Rheumatic and Non-Rheumatic Conditions by the Use of Cortisone Or of the Pituitary Adrenocorticotropic Hormone". His speech at the banquet during the award ceremony acknowledged the connections between the study of medicine and chemistry, saying of his co-winners "Perhaps the ratio of one physician to two chemists is symbolic, since medicine is so firmly linked to chemistry by a double bond."

During his career, Hench was one of the founding members of the American Rheumatism Association, and served as its president in 1940 and 1941. In addition to the Nobel Prize, Hench has been awarded the Heberdeen Medal (1942), the Lasker Award (1949), the Passano Foundation Award (1950), and the Criss Award. Lafayette College, Washington and Jefferson College, Western Reserve University, the National University of Ireland and the University of Pittsburgh awarded Hench honorary doctorates.

In addition to his work with cortisone, Hench had a career long interest in yellow fever. Starting in 1937, Hench began to document the history behind the discovery of yellow fever. His collection of documents on this subject are at the University of Virginia in the Philip S. Hench Walter Reed Yellow Fever Collection. His wife donated the collection to the university after his death.

== Family ==
Hench married Mary Kahler (1905–1982) in 1927. His father-in-law, John Henry Kahler, was a friend of Mayo Clinic founder William J. Mayo. Hench and his wife had four children, two daughters and two sons. His son, Philip Kahler Hench also studied rheumatology. Hench died of pneumonia while on vacation in Ocho Rios, Jamaica in 1965.
