= Membrane corticosteroid receptor =

Membrane corticosteroid receptor include:

- Membrane glucocorticoid receptor
- Membrane mineralocorticoid receptor
