= 6β-Hydroxycortisol =

Names
- IUPAC name (6R,8S,9S,10R,11S,13S,14S,17R)-6,11,17-trihydroxy-17-(2-hydroxyacetyl)-10,13-dimethyl-2,6,7,8,9,11,12,14,15,16-decahydro-1H-cyclopenta[a]phenanthren-3-one
- Other names 6-beta-hydroxycortisol, 6-beta-hydroxy-cortisol, 6beta-hydroxycortisol, 6beta-hydroxy-cortisol, 6β-OH-cortisol, 6beta-OH-cortisol, 6β-OHF, 6beta-OHF, 6β,11β,17,21-tetrahydroxypregn-4-ene-3,20-dione, (6β,11β)-6,11,17,21-tetrahydroxypregn-4-ene-3,20-dione, 6β,11β,17α,21-tetrahydroxypregn-4-ene-3,20-dione

Identifiers
| CAS Number | 53-35-0 |
| 3D model (JSmol) | Interactive image |
| ChEBI | CHEBI:139271 |
| ChEMBL | ChEMBL1389133 |
| ChemSpider | 5254712 |
| PubChem CID | 6852390 |
| UNII | J37WKJ5Y50 |
| CompTox Dashboard (EPA) | DTXSID80425873 |
- InChI: InChI=1S/C21H30O6/c1-19-5-3-11(23)7-14(19)15(24)8-12-13-4-6-21(27,17(26)10-22)20(13,2)9-16(25)18(12)19/h7,12-13,15-16,18,22,24-25,27H,3-6,8-10H2,1-2H3/t12-,13-,15+,16-,18+,19-,20-,21-/m0/s1 Key: GNFTWPCIRXSCQF-UJXAPRPESA-N; InChI=1S/C21H30O6/c1-19-5-3-11(23)7-14(19)15(24)8-12-13-4-6-21(27,17(26)10-22)20(13,2)9-16(25)18(12)19/h7,12-13,15-16,18,22,24-25,27H,3-6,8-10H2,1-2H3/t12-,13-,15+,16-,18+,19-,20-,21-/m0/s1
- SMILES: C1[C@@]2([C@@]([C@@]3(C([C@@H]1O)=CC(CC3)=O)C)([C@H](C[C@@]4([C@@](CC[C@@]24[H])(O)C(CO)=O)C)O)[H])[H]

Properties
| Chemical formula | C_{21}H_{30}O_{6} |
| Molar mass | 378.46 |
| Melting point | 239-241°C |
- Except where otherwise noted, data are given for materials in their standard state (at 25 °C [77 °F], 100 kPa). Infobox references

6β-Hydroxycortisol is an endogenous steroid. In humans, it is a metabolite of cortisol produced by cytochrome p450-3A monooxygenases, mainly, 6β-hydroxysteroid dehydrogenase (CYP3A4). 6β-hydroxycortisol is used as a biomarker of 6β-hydroxysteroid dehydrogenase (CYP3A4) activity. Drugs that induce CYP3A4 may accelerate cortisol clearance, by accelerating cortisol conversion to 6β-hydroxycortisol, and vice versa: drugs that inhibit CYP3A4 can slow down cortisol clearance, as they reduce the conversion of cortisol to 6β-hydroxycortisol.

== Biological role ==
Although the exact role of 6β-hydroxycortisol in the human body is not fully understood, it likely contributes to the metabolism and clearance of cortisol.

6β-hydroxycortisol is a metabolite of cortisol: the enzyme 6β-hydroxysteroid dehydrogenase (CYP3A4) catalyzes the formation of 6β-hydroxycortisol from cortisol in the liver and other tissues; the resulting 6β-hydroxycortisol is excreted in urine.

6β-hydroxycortisol levels may be affected by drugs that induce or inhibit CYP3A4, thereby affecting cortisol metabolism.

== Clinical significance ==
In normal metabolism, the level of 6β-hydroxycortisol is regulated by the activity of 6β-hydroxysteroid dehydrogenase (CYP3A4) and other enzymes involved in cortisol metabolism. Abnormal 6β-hydroxycortisol levels may indicate underlying metabolic abnormalities such as Cushing's syndrome, a condition characterized by overproduction of cortisol, or Addison's disease, a condition characterized by underproduction of cortisol.

6β-hydroxycortisol is being investigated as a potential biomarker of 6β-hydroxysteroid dehydrogenase (CYP3A4) activity and may have diagnostic or prognostic value in certain diseases. Understanding the role of 6β-hydroxycortisol in human physiology and disease may lead to the development of new diagnostic and therapeutic strategies.

In addition to cortisol, many drugs are also metabolized by CYP3A4. Examples of drugs metabolized by CYP3A4 are statins (used to lower cholesterol levels), benzodiazepines (used to treat anxiety and insomnia), calcium channel blockers (used to treat high blood pressure), etc. By measuring 6β-hydroxycortisol levels in clinical trials, researchers can assess whether certain drugs affect the activity CYP3A4 which is needed to metabolize other drugs and cortisol. Such observations bring knowledge about potentially dangerous drug interactions and help prevent life-threatening conditions in people who have impaired cortisol synthesis. One example of such dangerous interaction are modafinil (a stimulant) and hydrocortisone (an exogenous cortisol). Modafinil has the ability to induce the activity of CYP3A4 which is involved in hydrocortisone clearance and consequently decrease the bioavailability of hydrocortisone.

== See also ==
- CYP3A4
- Cortisol
- 18-Hydroxycortisol
