= Familial hyperaldosteronism =

Genetic disorder in which the adrenal glands produce excess aldosterone

- Specialty: Endocrinology

Familial hyperaldosteronism is a group of inherited conditions in which the adrenal glands, which are small glands located on top of each kidney, produce too much of the hormone aldosterone. Excess aldosterone causes the kidneys to retain more sodium than normal, which in turn increases the body's fluid levels and causes high blood pressure. People with familial hyperaldosteronism may develop severe high blood pressure that is frequently accompanied by low potassium levels (hypokalemia), often early in life. Without treatment, hypertension increases the risk of strokes, heart attacks, and kidney failure. There are other forms of hyperaldosteronism that are not inherited.

This condition is inherited in an autosomal dominant pattern, which means one copy of the altered gene in each cell is sufficient to cause the disorder. The various types of familial hyperaldosteronism have different genetic causes.

It is unclear how common these diseases are. All together they appear to make up less than 1% of cases of hyperaldosteronism.

== Types ==
Familial hyperaldosteronism is categorized into four types, distinguished by their clinical features and genetic causes.

=== Type I ===
In familial hyperaldosteronism type I, hypertension generally appears in childhood to early adulthood and can range from mild to severe. This type can be treated with steroid medications called glucocorticoids, so it is also known as glucocorticoid remediable aldosteronism (GRA).

=== Type II ===
In familial hyperaldosteronism type II, hypertension usually appears in early to middle adulthood and does not improve with glucocorticoid treatment.

=== Type III ===
In most with familial hyperaldosteronism type III, the adrenal glands are enlarged up to six times their normal size. These affected have severe hypertension that starts in childhood. The hypertension is difficult to treat and often results in damage to organs such as the heart and kidneys. Rarely, individuals with type III have milder symptoms with treatable hypertension and no adrenal gland enlargement.

=== Type IV ===
Familial hyperaldosteronism type IV was first described in 2015. Age of onset is variable.

== Cause ==
This condition is inherited in an autosomal dominant pattern, which means one copy of the altered gene in each cell is sufficient to cause the disorder. The various types of familial hyperaldosteronism have different genetic causes. Familial hyperaldosteronism type I is caused by the abnormal joining (fusion) of two similar genes called CYP11B1 and CYP11B2, which are located close together on chromosome 8. These genes provide instructions for making two enzymes that are found in the adrenal glands.

The CYP11B1 gene provides instructions for making an enzyme called 11-beta-hydroxylase. This enzyme helps produce hormones called cortisol and corticosterone. The CYP11B2 gene provides instructions for making another enzyme called aldosterone synthase, which helps produce aldosterone. When CYP11B1 and CYP11B2 are abnormally fused together, too much aldosterone synthase is produced. This overproduction causes the adrenal glands to make excess aldosterone, which leads to the signs and symptoms of familial hyperaldosteronism type I.

Familial hyperaldosteronism type III is caused by mutations in the KCNJ5 gene. The KCNJ5 gene provides instructions for making a protein that functions as a potassium channel, which means that it transports positively charged atoms (ions) of potassium into and out of cells. In the adrenal glands, the flow of ions through potassium channels produced from the KCNJ5 gene is thought to help regulate the production of aldosterone. Mutations in the KCNJ5 gene likely result in the production of potassium channels that are less selective, allowing other ions (predominantly sodium) to pass as well. The abnormal ion flow results in the activation of biochemical processes (pathways) that lead to increased aldosterone production, causing the hypertension associated with familial hyperaldosteronism type III.

The genetic cause of familial hyperaldosteronism type II is unknown.

== See also ==
- 18-Hydroxycortisol
- 18-Hydroxycorticosterone

Familial hyperaldosteronism type IV is caused by pathogenic mutations in the voltage-gated calcium channel (Ca_{v}3.2) that is encoded by the CACNA1H gene.
