= DU-41164 =

Chemical compound

Clinical data
- Other names: 1,2β-Methylene-6-fluoro-17α-acetoxy-δ^{6}-retroprogesterone; 6-Fluoro-17α-hydroxy-1,2β-methylene-9β,10α-pregna-4,6-diene-3,20-dione 17α-acetate; 6-Fluoro-1,2β-methylene-3,20-dioxo-9β,10α-pregna-4,6-dien-17α-yl acetate; (1α,2α,9β,10α)-17-Acetoxy-6-fluoro-1,2-dihydro-3'H-cyclopropa[1,2]pregna-1,4,6-triene-3,20-dione
- Routes of administration: By mouth
- Drug class: Progestin; Progestogen

Identifiers
- IUPAC name: (2aS,3aR,3bR,3cR,5aS,6R,8aS,8bR)-6-Acetyl-10-fluoro-3b,5a-dimethyl-2-oxo-2,2a,3,3a,3b,3c,4,5,5a,6,7,8,8a,8b-tetradecahydrocyclopenta[a]cyclopropa[g]phenanthren-6-yl acetate
- CAS Number: 34542-22-8
- PubChem CID: 193715
- ChemSpider: 168113
- UNII: 38JXQ87FEP
- CompTox Dashboard (EPA): DTXSID00956058

Chemical and physical data
- Formula: C_{24}H_{29}FO_{4}
- Molar mass: 400.490 g·mol^{−1}
- 3D model (JSmol): Interactive image
- SMILES: CC(=O)[C@]1(CC[C@@H]2[C@@]1(CC[C@@H]3[C@H]2C=C(C4=CC(=O)[C@H]5C[C@H]5[C@@]34C)F)C)OC(=O)C
- InChI: InChI=1S/C24H29FO4/c1-12(26)24(29-13(2)27)8-6-16-14-10-20(25)19-11-21(28)15-9-18(15)23(19,4)17(14)5-7-22(16,24)3/h10-11,14-18H,5-9H2,1-4H3/t14-,15-,16-,17+,18+,22-,23+,24-/m0/s1; Key:WJSHHKQEKQVLOP-QHAUNDHQSA-N

DU-41164, also known as 1,2β-methylene-6-fluoro-17α-acetoxy-δ^{6}-retroprogesterone, is a progestin which was developed by Philips-Duphar in the 1970s and was never marketed. It is a combined derivative of 17α-hydroxyprogesterone and retroprogesterone. The drug shows extremely high potency as a progestogen in animals; it was reported to possess 500 times the affinity of progesterone for the progesterone receptor expressed in rabbit uterus (K_{i} = 0.87 pM and 0.41 nM, respectively), and showed 600 times the progestogenic potency of subcutaneous progesterone when given orally in animals. The affinity of DU-41164 for the progesterone receptor was described in 1974 as "probably the highest reported for any steroid-receptor interaction". The drug showed no androgenic, anabolic, antiandrogenic, estrogenic, or corticosteroid activity in animals. Although highly potent in animals, DU-41164 produced little or no progestogenic effect at dosages of 50 and 200 μg/day in women, suggesting major species differences. A closely related compound, DU-41165, has been developed as a photoaffinity label for the progesterone receptor.
