= Oxisopred =

Chemical compound

Clinical data
- Other names: 11β,17α,21-Trihydroxy-B-homo-A-norpregn-1-ene-3,6,20-trione
- Drug class: Corticosteroid; Glucocorticoid

Identifiers
- IUPAC name: (1R,3aS,3bS,9aR,9bS,10S,11aS)-1-Glycoloyl-1,10-dihydroxy-9a,11a-dimethyl-2,3,3a,3b,4,5,6a,9a,9b,10,11,11a-dodecahydro-1H-indeno[5,4-e]azulene-6,7-dione
- CAS Number: 18118-80-4
- PubChem CID: 10474664
- ChemSpider: 32697494
- UNII: 0C39YBM73T

Chemical and physical data
- Formula: C_{21}H_{28}O_{6}
- Molar mass: 376.449 g·mol^{−1}
- 3D model (JSmol): Interactive image
- SMILES: C[C@]12C[C@@H]([C@H]3[C@H]([C@@H]1CC[C@@]2(C(=O)OC)O)CCC(=O)C4[C@@]3(C=CC4=O)C)O
- InChI: InChI=1S/C21H28O6/c1-19-8-7-14(23)17(19)13(22)5-4-11-12-6-9-21(26,18(25)27-3)20(12,2)10-15(24)16(11)19/h7-8,11-12,15-17,24,26H,4-6,9-10H2,1-3H3/t11-,12-,15-,16+,17?,19+,20-,21-/m0/s1; Key:KRYLHOFPHHPHIN-GJUVZVFTSA-N

Oxisopred is a synthetic glucocorticoid corticosteroid which was never marketed.
