= Cortisol =

Vertebrate natural glucocorticoid hormone

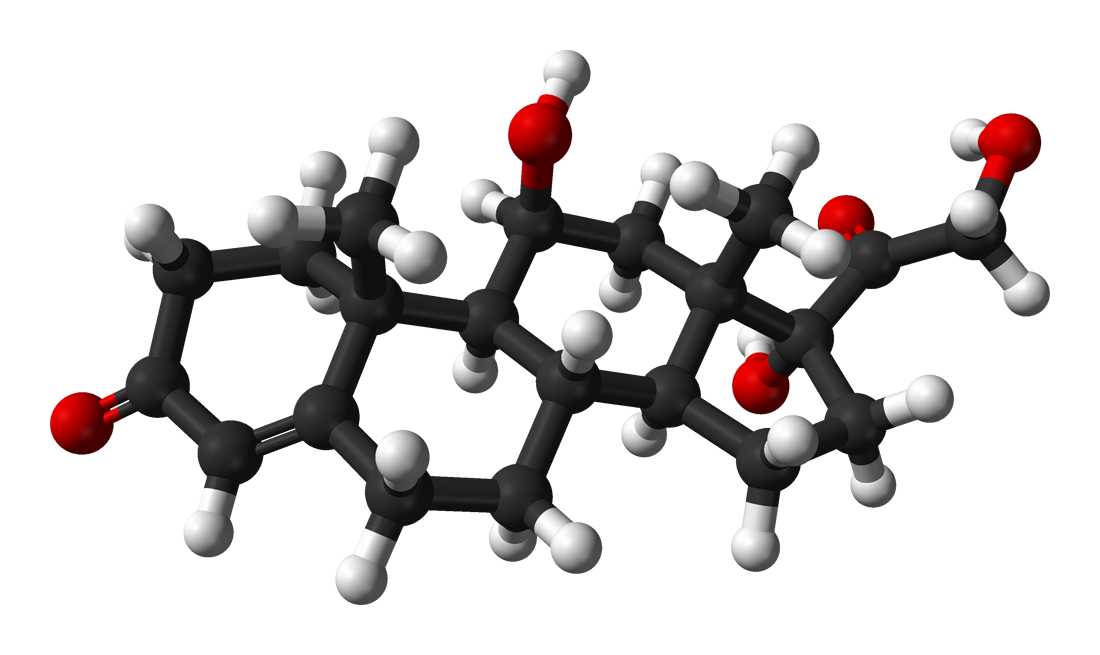

Names
- IUPAC name 11β,17α,21-Trihydroxypregn-4-ene-3,20-dione
- Systematic IUPAC name (1R,3aS,3bS,9aR,9bS,11aS)-1,10-Dihydroxy-1-(hydroxyacetyl)-9a,11a-dimethyl-1,2,3,3a,3b,4,5,8,9,9a,9b,10,11,11a-tetradecahydro-7H-cyclopenta[a]phenanthen-7-one

Identifiers
CAS Number	50-23-7
3D model (JSmol)	Interactive image
ChEBI	CHEBI:17650
ChEMBL	ChEMBL389621
ChemSpider	5551
DrugBank	DB00741
ECHA InfoCard	100.000.019
KEGG	D00088
PubChem CID	5754
UNII	WI4X0X7BPJ
CompTox Dashboard (EPA)	DTXSID7020714
- InChI: InChI=1S/C21H30O5/c1-19-7-5-13(23)9-12(19)3-4-14-15-6-8-21(26,17(25)11-22)20(15,2)10-16(24)18(14)19/h9,14-16,18,22,24,26H,3-8,10-11H2,1-2H3/t14-,15-,16-,18+,19-,20-,21-/m0/s1 Key: JYGXADMDTFJGBT-VWUMJDOOSA-N
- SMILES: O=C4\C=C2/[C@]([C@H]1[C@@H](O)C[C@@]3([C@@](O)(C(=O)CO)CC[C@H]3[C@@H]1CC2)C)(C)CC4

Properties
Chemical formula	C_{21}H_{30}O_{5}
Molar mass	362.460 g/mol
- Except where otherwise noted, data are given for materials in their standard state (at 25 °C [77 °F], 100 kPa). Infobox references

Cortisol is a steroid hormone in the glucocorticoid class of hormones and a stress hormone. When used as medication, it is known as hydrocortisone.

Cortisol is produced in many animals, mainly by the zona fasciculata of the adrenal cortex in an adrenal gland. In other tissues, it is produced in lower quantities. By a diurnal cycle, cortisol is released and increases in response to stress and a low blood-glucose concentration. It functions to increase blood sugar through gluconeogenesis, suppress the immune system, and aid in energy metabolism. It also decreases bone formation. These stated functions are carried out by cortisol binding to glucocorticoid or mineralocorticoid receptors inside a cell, which then bind to DNA to affect gene expression.

== Biological activity ==
Cortisol acts as an agonist of the corticosteroid receptors, including the glucocorticoid receptor (GR) and mineralocorticoid receptor (MR). Cortisol is also an agonist of membrane corticosteroid receptors, including membrane glucocorticoid receptors (mGRs) and membrane mineralocorticoid receptors (mMRs).

In addition to its corticosteroid receptor agonism, cortisol has been reported to be a highly potent biphasic regulator of the GABA_{A} receptor, acting as a positive allosteric modulator at low concentrations (1–10 pM) and as a negative allosteric modulator at high concentrations (10–1,000 nM).

== Health effects ==
=== Metabolic response ===
==== Metabolism of glucose ====
Cortisol regulates glucose metabolism and promotes gluconeogenesis (glucose synthesis) in the liver, producing glucose to provide to other tissues. It also increases blood glucose levels by reducing glucose uptake in muscle and adipose tissue, decreasing protein synthesis, and increasing the breakdown of fats into fatty acids (lipolysis). All of these metabolic steps have the net effect of increasing blood glucose levels, which fuel the brain and other tissues during the fight-or-flight response. Cortisol is also responsible for releasing amino acids from muscle, providing a substrate for gluconeogenesis. Its impact is complex and diverse.

In general, cortisol stimulates gluconeogenesis (the synthesis of 'new' glucose from non-carbohydrate sources, which occurs mainly in the liver, but also in the kidneys and small intestine under certain circumstances). The net effect is an increase in the concentration of glucose in the blood, further complemented by a decrease in the sensitivity of peripheral tissue to insulin, thus preventing this tissue from taking the glucose from the blood. Cortisol has a permissive effect on the actions of hormones that increase glucose production, such as glucagon and adrenaline.

Cortisol also plays an important, but indirect, role in liver and muscle glycogenolysis (the breaking down of glycogen to glucose-1-phosphate and glucose) which occurs as a result of the action of glucagon and adrenaline. Additionally, cortisol facilitates the activation of glycogen phosphorylase, which is necessary for adrenaline to have an effect on glycogenolysis.

Paradoxically, cortisol promotes both gluconeogenesis (biosynthesis of glucose molecules) in the liver and glycogenesis (polymerization of glucose molecules into glycogen); cortisol is thus better thought of as stimulating glucose/glycogen turnover in the liver. This is in contrast to cortisol's effect in the skeletal muscle where glycogenolysis is promoted indirectly through catecholamines. In this way, cortisol and catecholamines work synergistically to promote the breakdown of muscle glycogen into glucose for use in the muscle tissue.

==== Metabolism of proteins and lipids ====
Elevated levels of cortisol, if prolonged, can lead to proteolysis (breakdown of proteins) and muscle wasting. The reason for proteolysis is to provide the relevant tissue with a feedstock for gluconeogenesis; see glucogenic amino acids. The effects of cortisol on lipid metabolism are more complicated since lipogenesis is observed in patients with chronic, raised circulating glucocorticoid (i.e. cortisol) levels, although an acute increase in circulating cortisol promotes lipolysis. The usual explanation to account for this apparent discrepancy is that the raised blood glucose concentration (through the action of cortisol) will stimulate insulin release. Insulin stimulates lipogenesis, so this is an indirect consequence of the raised cortisol concentration in the blood but it will only occur over a longer time scale.

=== Immune response ===
Cortisol prevents the release of substances in the body that cause inflammation. Cortisol is used to treat conditions resulting from overactivity of the B-cell-mediated antibody response. Examples include inflammatory and rheumatoid diseases, as well as allergies. Low-dose topical hydrocortisone, available as a nonprescription medicine in some countries, is used to treat skin problems such as rashes and eczema.

Cortisol inhibits production of interleukin 12 (IL-12), interferon gamma (IFN-gamma), IFN-alpha, and tumor necrosis factor alpha (TNF-alpha) by antigen-presenting cells (APCs) and T helper cells (Th1 cells), but upregulates interleukin 4, interleukin 10, and interleukin 13 by Th2 cells. This change results in a shift toward a Th2 immune response rather than general immunosuppression. The activation of the stress system (and resulting increase in cortisol and Th2 shift) seen during an infection is believed to be a protective mechanism which prevents an over-activation of the inflammatory response.

Cortisol can weaken the activity of the immune system. Cortisol prevents proliferation of T-cells by rendering the interleukin-2 producer T-cells unresponsive to interleukin-1, and unable to produce the T-cell growth factor IL-2. Cortisol downregulates the expression of the IL2 receptor IL-2R on the surface of the helper T-cell which is necessary to induce a Th1 'cellular' immune response. This thus favors a shift towards Th2 dominance and the release of the cytokines listed above which results in Th2 dominance and favors the 'humoral' B-cell mediated antibody immune response.

Cortisol also has a negative-feedback effect on IL-1. The way this negative feedback works is that an immune stressor causes peripheral immune cells to release IL-1 and other cytokines such as IL-6 and TNF-alpha. These cytokines stimulate the hypothalamus, causing it to release corticotropin-releasing hormone (CRH). CRH in turn stimulates the production of adrenocorticotropic hormone (ACTH) among other things in the adrenal gland, which (among other things) increases production of cortisol. Cortisol then closes the loop as it inhibits TNF-alpha production in immune cells and makes them less responsive to IL-1.

Through this system, as long as an immune stressor is small, the response will be regulated to the correct level. In general, the hypothalamus uses cortisol to reduce the response once the production of cortisol matches the stress induced on the immune system. But in a severe infection or in a situation where the immune system is overly sensitized to an antigen (such as in allergic reactions) or there is a massive flood of antigens (as can happen with endotoxic bacteria) the correct set point might never be reached Also because of downregulation of Th1 immunity by cortisol and other signaling molecules, certain types of infection (such as Mycobacterium tuberculosis) can trick the body into getting locked in the wrong mode of attack, using an antibody-mediated humoral response when a cellular response is needed.

Lymphocytes include the B-cell lymphocytes that are the antibody-producing cells of the body, and are thus the main agents of humoral immunity. A larger number of lymphocytes in the lymph nodes, bone marrow, and skin means the body is increasing its humoral immune response. B-cell lymphocytes release antibodies into the bloodstream. These antibodies lower infection through three main pathways: neutralization, opsonization, and complement activation. Antibodies neutralize pathogens by binding to surface adhering proteins, keeping pathogens from binding to host cells. In opsonization, antibodies bind to the pathogen and create a target for phagocytic immune cells to find and latch onto, allowing them to destroy the pathogen more easily. Finally antibodies can also activate complement molecules which can combine in various ways to promote opsonization or even act directly to lyse a bacteria. There are many different kinds of antibody and their production is highly complex, involving several types of lymphocyte, but in general lymphocytes and other antibody regulating and producing cells will migrate to the lymph nodes to aid in the release of these antibodies into the bloodstream.

On the other hand, there are natural killer cells; these cells have the ability to take down threats that are larger in size, such as bacteria, parasites, and tumor cells. A separate study found that cortisol effectively disarmed natural killer cells, downregulating the expression of their natural cytotoxicity receptors. Prolactin has the opposite effect. It increases the expression of cytotoxicity receptors on natural killer cells, increasing their potency.

Cortisol stimulates many copper enzymes (often to 50% of their total potential), including lysyl oxidase, an enzyme that cross-links collagen and elastin. Especially valuable for immune response is cortisol's stimulation of the superoxide dismutase, since this copper enzyme is almost certainly used by the body to permit superoxides to poison bacteria.

Some viruses, such as influenza and SARS-CoV-1 and SARS-CoV-2, are known to suppress the secretion of stress hormones to avoid the organism's immune response. These viruses suppress cortisol by producing a protein that mimics the human ACTH hormone but is incomplete and does not have hormonal activity. ACTH is a hormone that stimulates the adrenal gland to produce cortisol and other steroid hormones. However, the organism makes antibodies against this viral protein, and those antibodies also kill the human ACTH hormone, which leads to the suppression of adrenal gland function. Such adrenal suppression is a way for a virus to evade immune detection and elimination. This viral strategy can have severe consequences for the host (human that is infected by the virus), as cortisol is essential for regulating various physiological processes, such as metabolism, blood pressure, inflammation, and immune response.

A lack of cortisol can result in a condition called adrenal insufficiency, which can cause symptoms such as fatigue, weight loss, low blood pressure, nausea, vomiting, and abdominal pain. Adrenal insufficiency can also impair the ability of the host to cope with stress and infections, as cortisol helps to mobilize energy sources, increase heart rate, and downregulate non-essential metabolic processes during stress. Therefore, by suppressing cortisol production, some viruses can escape the immune system and weaken the host's overall health and resilience.

== Other effects ==
=== Metabolism ===
==== Glucose ====
Cortisol counteracts insulin, contributes to hyperglycemia by stimulating gluconeogenesis and inhibits the peripheral use of glucose (insulin resistance) by decreasing the translocation of glucose transporters (especially GLUT4) to the cell membrane. Cortisol also increases glycogen synthesis (glycogenesis) in the liver, storing glucose in easily accessible form.

==== Bone and collagen ====
Cortisol reduces bone formation, favoring long-term development of osteoporosis (progressive bone disease). The mechanism behind this is two-fold: cortisol stimulates the production of RANKL by osteoblasts which stimulates, through binding to RANK receptors, the activity of osteoclasts, cells responsible for calcium resorption from bone, and also inhibits the production of osteoprotegerin (OPG) which acts as a decoy receptor and captures some RANKL before it can activate the osteoclasts through RANK. In other words, when RANKL binds to OPG, no response occurs as opposed to the binding to RANK which leads to the activation of osteoclasts.

It transports potassium out of cells in exchange for an equal number of sodium ions (see above). This can trigger the hyperkalemia of metabolic shock from surgery. Cortisol also reduces calcium absorption in the intestine. Cortisol down-regulates the synthesis of collagen.

==== Amino acid ====
Cortisol raises the free amino acids in the serum by inhibiting collagen formation, decreasing amino acid uptake by muscle, and inhibiting protein synthesis. Cortisol (as opticortinol) may inversely inhibit IgA precursor cells in the intestines of calves. Cortisol also inhibits IgA in serum, as it does IgM; however, it is not shown to inhibit IgE.

=== Electrolyte balance ===
Cortisol increases glomerular filtration rate, and renal plasma flow from the kidneys thus increasing phosphate excretion, as well as increasing sodium and water retention and potassium excretion by acting on mineralocorticoid receptors. It also increases sodium and water absorption and potassium excretion in the intestines.

==== Sodium ====
Cortisol promotes sodium absorption through the small intestine of mammals. Sodium depletion, however, does not affect cortisol levels so cortisol cannot be used to regulate serum sodium. Cortisol's original purpose may have been sodium transport. This hypothesis is supported by the fact that freshwater fish use cortisol to stimulate sodium inward, while saltwater fish have a cortisol-based system for expelling excess sodium.

==== Potassium ====
A sodium load augments the intense potassium excretion by cortisol. Corticosterone is comparable to cortisol in this case. For potassium to move out of the cell, cortisol moves an equal number of sodium ions into the cell. This should make pH regulation much easier (unlike the normal potassium-deficiency situation, in which two sodium ions move in for each three potassium ions that move out—closer to the deoxycorticosterone effect).

=== Stomach and kidneys ===
Cortisol stimulates gastric-acid secretion. Cortisol's only direct effect on the hydrogen-ion excretion of the kidneys is to stimulate the excretion of ammonium ions by deactivating the renal glutaminase enzyme.

=== Memory ===
Cortisol works with adrenaline (epinephrine) to create memories of short-term emotional events; this is the proposed mechanism for storage of flash bulb memories, and may originate as a means to remember what to avoid in the future. However, long-term exposure to cortisol damages cells in the hippocampus; this damage results in impaired learning.

=== Circadian and ultradian rhythms in cortisol ===
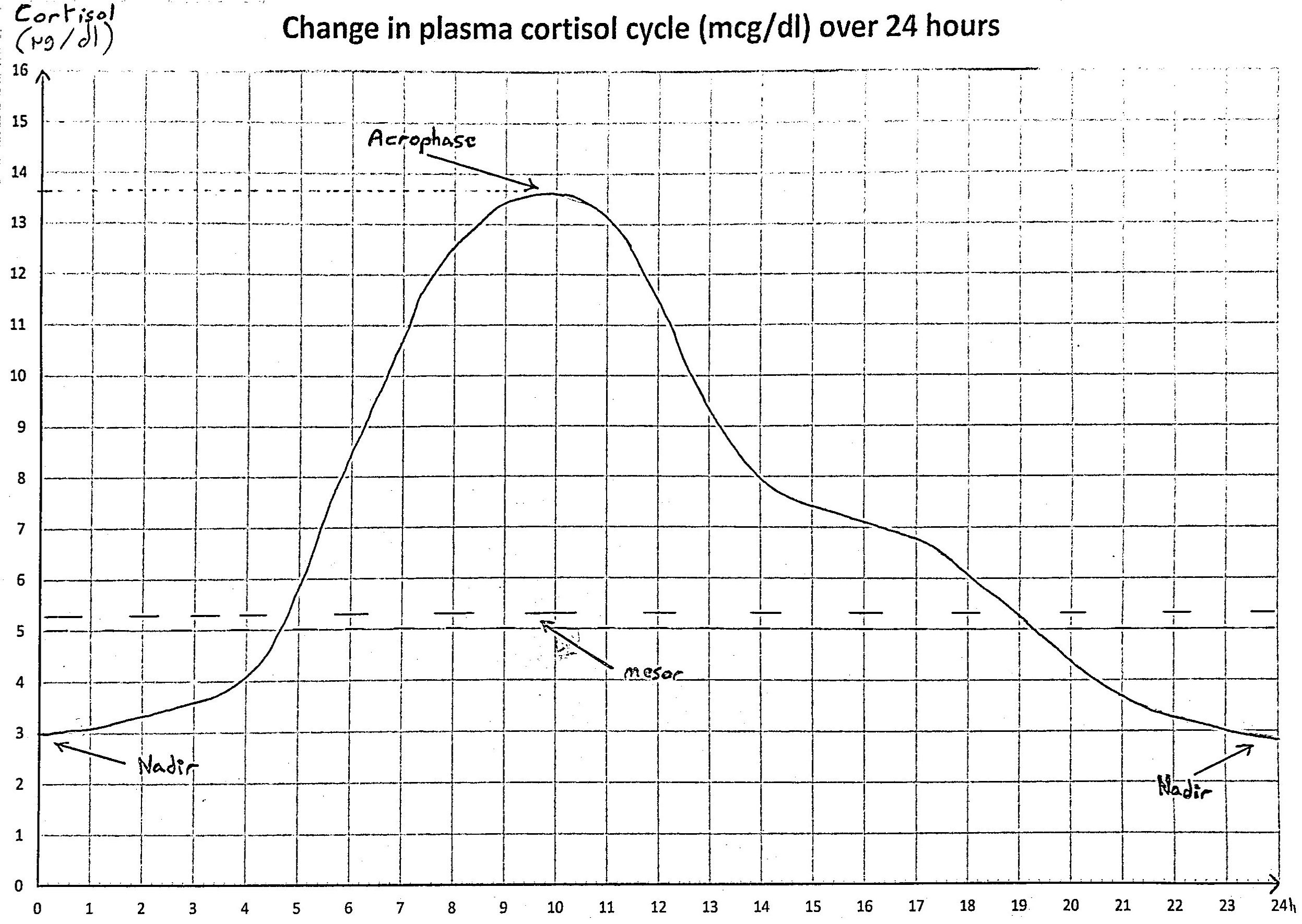
Change in plasma cortisol cycle (mcg/dL) over 24 hours

Diurnal cycles of cortisol levels are found in humans. In humans, this cycle is characterized by high levels of cortisol early in the morning just before or at the time of waking. This is often known as the cortisol awakening response. Cortisol levels then decrease over the day with a nadir in the late evening. In addition to the diurnal rhythm over the day night cycle, cortisol is also released in an ultradian rhythm. This ultradian rhythm is characterized by hourly pulses of cortisol secretion.

=== Stress ===
Sustained stress can lead to high levels of circulating cortisol (regarded as one of the more important of the several "stress hormones"). Women show larger increases in cortisol than men when chronically stressed.

=== Effects during pregnancy ===
During human pregnancy, increased fetal production of cortisol between weeks 30 and 32 initiates production of fetal lung pulmonary surfactant to promote maturation of the lungs. In fetal lambs, glucocorticoids (principally cortisol) increase after about day 130, with lung surfactant increasing greatly, in response, by about day 135, and although lamb fetal cortisol is mostly of maternal origin during the first 122 days, 88% or more is of fetal origin by day 136 of gestation. Although the timing of fetal cortisol concentration elevation in sheep may vary somewhat, it averages about 11.8 days before the onset of labor. In several livestock species (e.g. cattle, sheep, goats, and pigs), the surge of fetal cortisol late in gestation triggers the onset of parturition by removing the progesterone block of cervical dilation and myometrial contraction. The mechanisms yielding this effect on progesterone differ among species. In the sheep, where progesterone sufficient for maintaining pregnancy is produced by the placenta after about day 70 of gestation, the prepartum fetal cortisol surge induces placental enzymatic conversion of progesterone to estrogen. (The elevated level of estrogen stimulates prostaglandin secretion and oxytocin receptor development.)

Exposure of fetuses to cortisol during gestation can have a variety of developmental outcomes, including alterations in prenatal and postnatal growth patterns. In marmosets, a species of New World primates, pregnant females have varying levels of cortisol during gestation, both within and between females. Infants born to mothers with high gestational cortisol during the first trimester of pregnancy had lower rates of growth in body mass indices than infants born to mothers with low gestational cortisol (about 20% lower). However, postnatal growth rates in these high-cortisol infants were more rapid than low-cortisol infants later in postnatal periods, and complete catch-up in growth had occurred by 540 days of age. These results suggest that gestational exposure to cortisol in fetuses has important potential fetal programming effects on both pre and postnatal growth in primates.

=== Cortisol face ===
Increased cortisol levels may lead to facial swelling and bloating, creating a round and puffy appearance, referred to as "cortisol face." This is not due to everyday stress, but due to rare hormonal disorders.

== Synthesis and release ==
Cortisol is produced in the human body by the adrenal gland's zona fasciculata, the second of three layers comprising the adrenal cortex. This cortex forms the outer "bark" of each adrenal gland, situated atop the kidneys. The release of cortisol is controlled by the hypothalamus of a brain. Secretion of corticotropin-releasing hormone by the hypothalamus triggers cells in its neighboring anterior pituitary to secrete adrenocorticotropic hormone (ACTH) into the vascular system, through which blood carries it to the adrenal cortex. ACTH stimulates the synthesis of cortisol and other glucocorticoids, mineralocorticoid aldosterone, and dehydroepiandrosterone.

== Testing of individuals ==
Normal values indicated in the following tables pertain to humans as normal levels vary among species. Measured cortisol levels, and therefore reference ranges, depend on the sample type, the analytical method used, and factors such as age and sex. Test results should, therefore, always be interpreted using the reference range from the laboratory that produced the analysis. An individual's cortisol levels can be measured in blood, serum, urine, saliva, and sweat.

Reference ranges for blood plasma content of free cortisol
Time	Lower limit	Upper limit	Unit
09:00 am	140	700	nmol/L
09:00 am	5	25	μg/dL
Midnight	80	350	nmol/L
Midnight	2.9	13	μg/dL

Using the molecular weight of 362.460 g/mole, the conversion factor from μg/dL to nmol/L is approximately 27.6; thus, 10 μg/dL is about 276 nmol/L.

Reference ranges for urinalysis of free cortisol (urinary free cortisol or UFC)
Lower limit	Upper limit	Unit
28 or 30	280 or 490	nmol/24h
10 or 11	100 or 176	μg/24 h

Cortisol follows a circadian rhythm, and to accurately measure cortisol levels is best to test four times per day through saliva. An individual may have normal total cortisol but have a lower than normal level during a certain period of the day and a higher than normal level during a different period. Therefore, some scholars question the clinical utility of cortisol measurement.

Cortisol is lipophilic, and is transported bound to transcortin (also known as corticosteroid-binding globulin (CBG)) and albumin, while only a small part of the total serum cortisol is unbound and has biological activity. This binding of cortisol to transcortin is accomplished through hydrophobic interactions in which cortisol binds in a 1:1 ratio. Serum cortisol assays measures total cortisol, and its results may be misleading for patients with altered serum protein concentrations. The salivary cortisol test avoids this problem because only free cortisol can pass through the blood-saliva barrier. Transcortin particles are too large to pass through this barrier, that consists of epithelial cell layers of the oral mucosa and salivary glands.

Cortisol may be incorporated into hair from blood, sweat, and sebum. A 3 centimeter segment of scalp hair can represent 3 months of hair growth, although growth rates can vary in different regions of the scalp. Cortisol in hair is a reliable indicator of chronic cortisol exposure.

Automated immunoassays lack specificity and show significant cross-reactivity due to interactions with structural analogs of cortisol, and show differences between assays. Liquid chromatography–tandem mass spectrometry (LC-MS/MS) can improve specificity and sensitivity.

== Disorders of cortisol production ==
Some medical disorders are related to abnormal cortisol production, such as:

- Primary hypercortisolism (Cushing's syndrome): excessive levels of cortisol
  - Secondary hypercortisolism (pituitary tumor resulting in Cushing's disease, pseudo-Cushing's syndrome)
- Primary hypocortisolism (Addison's disease, Nelson's syndrome): insufficient levels of cortisol
  - Secondary hypocortisolism (pituitary tumor, Sheehan's syndrome)

== Regulation ==
The primary control of cortisol is the pituitary gland peptide, adrenocorticotropic hormone (ACTH). Once released from the pituitary, ACTH travels in the general circulation to the adrenal gland where it binds to melanocortin 2 receptors which stimulate cortisol production. ACTH is in turn controlled by the hypothalamic peptide corticotropin-releasing hormone (CRH), which is under nervous control. CRH acts synergistically with arginine vasopressin, angiotensin II, and epinephrine. (In swine, which do not produce arginine vasopressin, lysine vasopressin acts synergistically with CRH.)

When activated macrophages start to secrete IL-1, which synergistically with CRH increases ACTH, T-cells also secrete glucosteroid response modifying factor (GRMF), as well as IL-1; both increase the amount of cortisol required to inhibit almost all the immune cells. Immune cells then assume their own regulation, but at a higher cortisol setpoint. The increase in cortisol in diarrheic calves is minimal over healthy calves, however, and falls over time. The cells do not lose all their fight-or-flight override because of interleukin-1's synergism with CRH. Cortisol even has a negative feedback effect on interleukin-1—especially useful to treat diseases that force the hypothalamus to secrete too much CRH, such as those caused by endotoxic bacteria. The suppressor immune cells are not affected by GRMF, so the immune cells' effective setpoint may be even higher than the setpoint for physiological processes. GRMF affects primarily the liver (rather than the kidneys) for some physiological processes.

High-potassium media (which stimulates aldosterone secretion in vitro) also stimulate cortisol secretion from the fasciculata zone of canine adrenals—unlike corticosterone, upon which potassium has no effect.

Potassium loading also increases ACTH and cortisol in humans. This is probably the reason why potassium deficiency causes cortisol to decline (as mentioned) and causes a decrease in conversion of 11-deoxycortisol to cortisol. This may also have a role in rheumatoid-arthritis pain; cell potassium is always low in RA.

Ascorbic acid presence, particularly in high doses has also been shown to mediate response to psychological stress and speed the decrease of the levels of circulating cortisol in the body post-stress. This decline can be evidenced through a decrease in systolic and diastolic blood pressures and decreased salivary cortisol levels after treatment with ascorbic acid.

=== Factors increasing cortisol levels ===
- Viral infections increase cortisol levels through activation of the HPA axis by cytokines.
- Intense (high VO_{2} max) or prolonged aerobic exercise transiently increases cortisol levels to increase gluconeogenesis and maintain blood glucose; however, cortisol declines to normal levels after eating (i.e., restoring a neutral energy balance).
- Severe trauma or stressful events can elevate cortisol levels in the blood for prolonged periods.
- Low-carbohydrate diets cause a short-term increase in resting cortisol (≈3 weeks), and increase the cortisol response to aerobic exercise in the short- and long-term.
- Increase in the concentration of ghrelin, the hunger stimulating hormone, increases levels of cortisol.

== Biochemistry ==
=== Biosynthesis ===
Steroidogenesis, showing cortisol at right

Cortisol is synthesized from cholesterol. Synthesis takes place in the zona fasciculata of an adrenal cortex.

The name "cortisol" is derived from the word 'cortex'. Cortex means "the outer layer"—a reference to the adrenal cortex, the part of the adrenal gland where cortisol is produced.

While the adrenal cortex in humans also produces aldosterone in the zona glomerulosa and some sex hormones in the zona reticularis, cortisol is its main secretion in humans and several other species. In cattle, corticosterone levels may approach or exceed cortisol levels. In humans, the medulla of the adrenal gland lies under its cortex, mainly secreting the catecholamines adrenaline (epinephrine) and noradrenaline (norepinephrine) under sympathetic stimulation.

Synthesis of cortisol in the adrenal gland is stimulated by the anterior lobe of the pituitary gland with ACTH; ACTH production is, in turn, stimulated by CRH, which is released by the hypothalamus. ACTH increases the concentration of cholesterol in the inner mitochondrial membrane, via regulation of the steroidogenic acute regulatory protein. It also stimulates the main rate-limiting step in cortisol synthesis, in which cholesterol is converted to pregnenolone and catalyzed by cytochrome P450SCC (side-chain cleavage enzyme).

=== Metabolism ===
==== 11beta-hydroxysteroid dehydrogenases ====
Cortisol is metabolized reversibly to cortisone by the 11-beta hydroxysteroid dehydrogenase system (11-beta HSD), which consists of two enzymes: 11-beta HSD1 and 11-beta HSD2. The metabolism of cortisol to cortisone involves oxidation of the hydroxyl group at the 11-beta position.

==== A-ring reductases (5alpha- and 5beta-reductases) ====
Cortisol is also metabolized irreversibly into 5-alpha tetrahydrocortisol (5-alpha THF) and 5-beta tetrahydrocortisol (5-beta THF), reactions for which 5-alpha reductase and 5-beta-reductase are the rate-limiting factors, respectively. 5-Beta reductase is also the rate-limiting factor in the conversion of cortisone to tetrahydrocortisone.

==== Cytochrome P450, family 3, subfamily A monooxygenases ====
Cortisol is also metabolized irreversibly into 6β-hydroxycortisol by cytochrome p450-3A monooxygenases, mainly, CYP3A4. Drugs that induce CYP3A4 may accelerate cortisol clearance.

== Chemistry ==
Cortisol is a naturally occurring pregnane corticosteroid and is also known as 11β,17α,21-trihydroxypregn-4-ene-3,20-dione.

== Animals ==
In animals, cortisol is often used as an indicator of stress and can be measured in blood, saliva, urine, hair, and faeces.

== See also ==
- Cortisone, a hormone
- Cortisol awakening response
- List of corticosteroids
- Membrane glucocorticoid receptor
