= Dexamethasone =

Corticosteroid medication

- Dexamethasone molecular structure

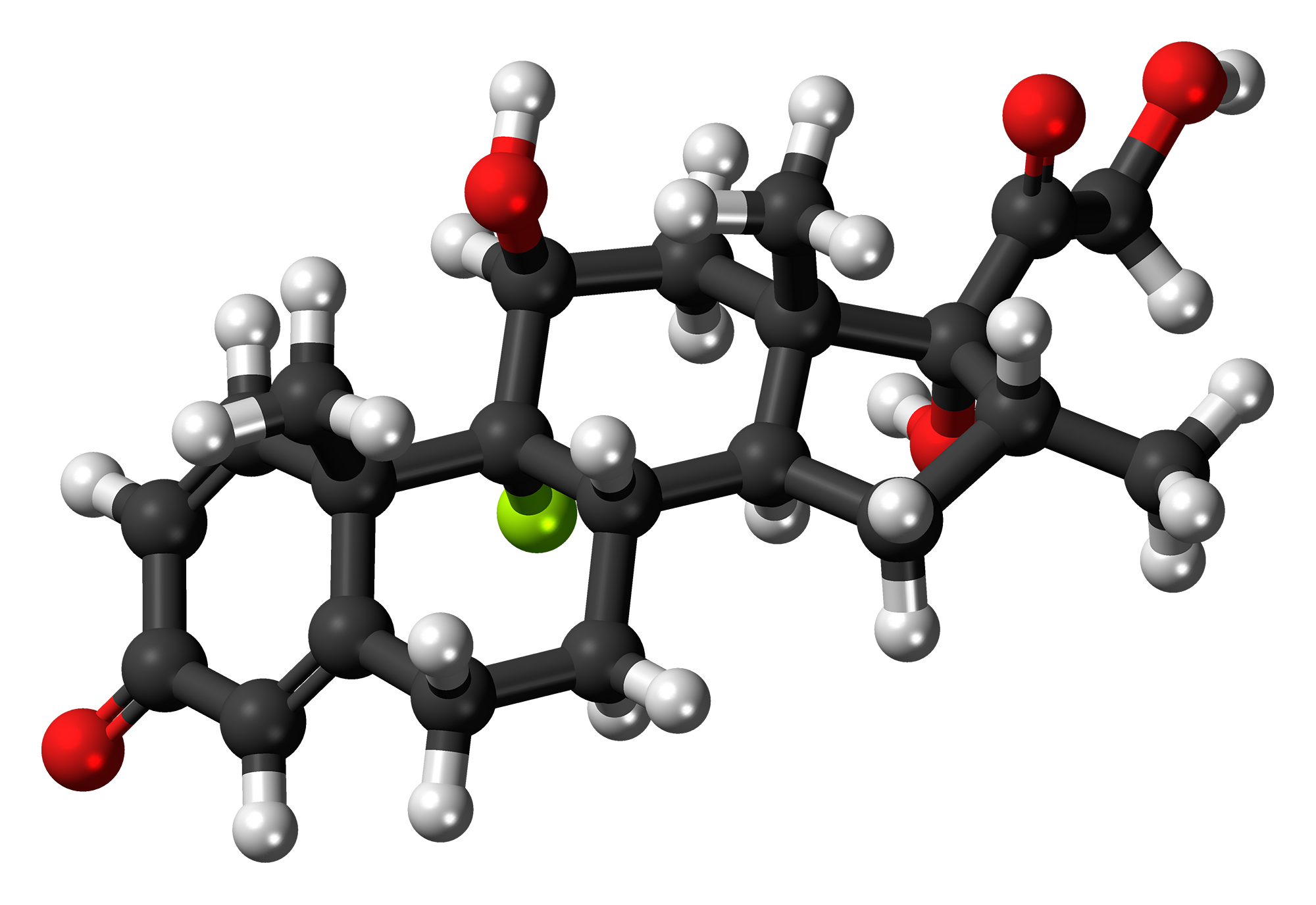
- 3D representation of dexamethasone

Clinical data
- Trade names: Decadron, Ozurdex, Dexycu, others
- AHFS/Drugs.com: Monograph
- MedlinePlus: a682792
- License data: US DailyMed: Dexamethasone
- Pregnancy category: AU: A
- Routes of administration: By mouth, intravenous, intramuscular, subcutaneous, intraosseous, intravitreal, eye drop
- ATC code: A01AC02 (WHO) C05AA09 (WHO), D07AB19 (WHO), D10AA03 (WHO), H02AB02 (WHO), R01AD03 (WHO), S01BA01 (WHO), S02BA06 (WHO), S03BA01 (WHO)

Legal status
- Legal status: AU: S4 (Prescription only); CA: ℞-only; UK: POM (Prescription only); US: ℞-only; EU: Rx-only; In general: ℞ (Prescription only)

Pharmacokinetic data
- Bioavailability: 80–90%
- Protein binding: 77%
- Metabolism: Liver
- Elimination half-life: biological half-life: 36 to 54 hours; plasma half-life: 4 to 5 hours
- Excretion: Urine (65%)

Identifiers
- IUPAC name: (8S,9R,10S,11S,13S,14S,16R,17R)-9-Fluoro-11,17-dihydroxy-17-(2-hydroxyacetyl)-10,13,16-trimethyl-6,7,8,9,10,11,12,13,14,15,16,17-dodecahydro-3H-cyclopenta[a]phenanthren-3-one
- CAS Number: 50-02-2
- PubChem CID: 5743
- IUPHAR/BPS: 2768
- DrugBank: DB01234
- ChemSpider: 5541
- UNII: 7S5I7G3JQL
- KEGG: D00292
- ChEBI: CHEBI:41879
- ChEMBL: ChEMBL384467
- PDB ligand: DEX (PDBe, RCSB PDB)
- CompTox Dashboard (EPA): DTXSID3020384
- ECHA InfoCard: 100.000.004

Chemical and physical data
- Formula: C_{22}H_{29}FO_{5}
- Molar mass: 392.467 g·mol^{−1}
- 3D model (JSmol): Interactive image
- Melting point: 262 °C (504 °F)
- SMILES: O=C(CO)[C@]3(O)[C@]2(C[C@H](O)[C@]4(F)[C@@]1(C(=CC(=O)C=C1)CC[C@H]4[C@@H]2C[C@H]3C)C)C
- InChI: InChI=1S/C22H29FO5/c1-12-8-16-15-5-4-13-9-14(25)6-7-19(13,2)21(15,23)17(26)10-20(16,3)22(12,28)18(27)11-24/h6-7,9,12,15-17,24,26,28H,4-5,8,10-11H2,1-3H3/t12-,15+,16+,17+,19+,20+,21+,22+/m1/s1; Key:UREBDLICKHMUKA-CXSFZGCWSA-N

Dexamethasone is a fluorinated glucocorticoid medication used to treat rheumatic problems, a number of skin diseases, severe allergies, asthma, chronic obstructive pulmonary disease (COPD), croup, brain swelling, eye pain following eye surgery, superior vena cava syndrome (a complication of some forms of cancer), and along with antibiotics in tuberculosis. In adrenocortical insufficiency, it may be used in combination with a mineralocorticoid medication such as fludrocortisone. In preterm labor, it may be used to improve outcomes in the baby. It may be given by mouth, as an injection into a muscle, as an injection into a vein, as a topical cream or ointment for the skin or as a topical ophthalmic solution to the eye. The effects of dexamethasone are frequently seen within a day and last for about three days.

The long-term use of dexamethasone may result in thrush, bone loss, cataracts, easy bruising, or muscle weakness. It is in pregnancy category C in the United States, meaning that it should only be used when the benefits are predicted to be greater than the risks. In Australia, the oral use is category A, meaning it has been frequently used in pregnancy and not been found to cause problems to the baby. It should not be taken when breastfeeding. Dexamethasone has anti-inflammatory and immunosuppressant effects.

Dexamethasone was first synthesized in 1957 by Philip Showalter Hench and was approved for medical use in 1958. It is on the World Health Organization's List of Essential Medicines. In 2023, it was the 246th most commonly prescribed medication in the United States, with more than 1 million prescriptions. It is available as a generic medication. In 2023, the combination of dexamethasone with neomycin and polymyxin B was the 260th most commonly prescribed medication in the United States, with more than 1 million prescriptions; and the combination of dexamethasone with ciprofloxacin was the 283rd most commonly prescribed medication in the United States, with more than 700,000 prescriptions;

== Medical uses ==
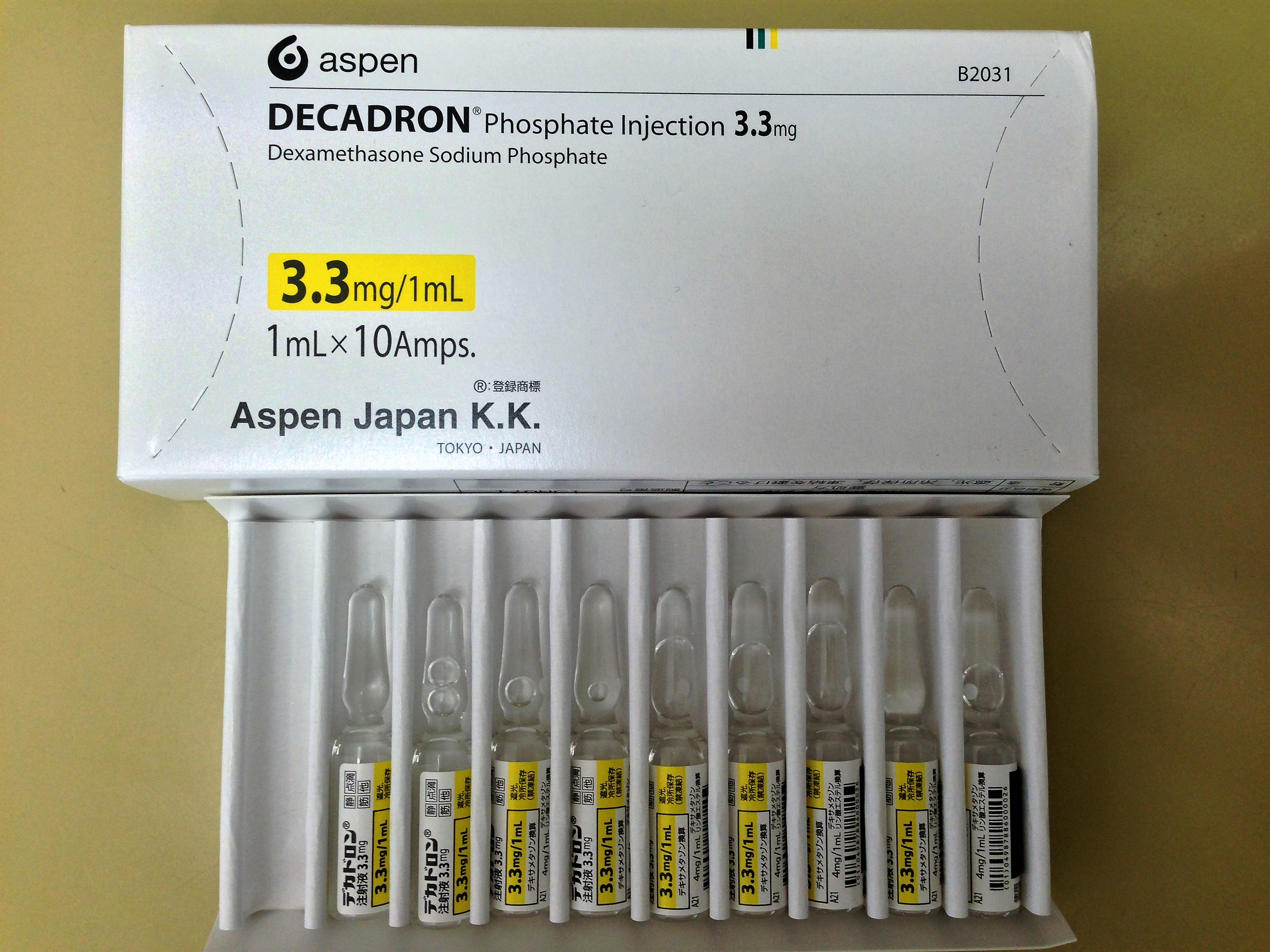
Dexamethasone phosphate injection ampoules

=== Anti-inflammatory ===
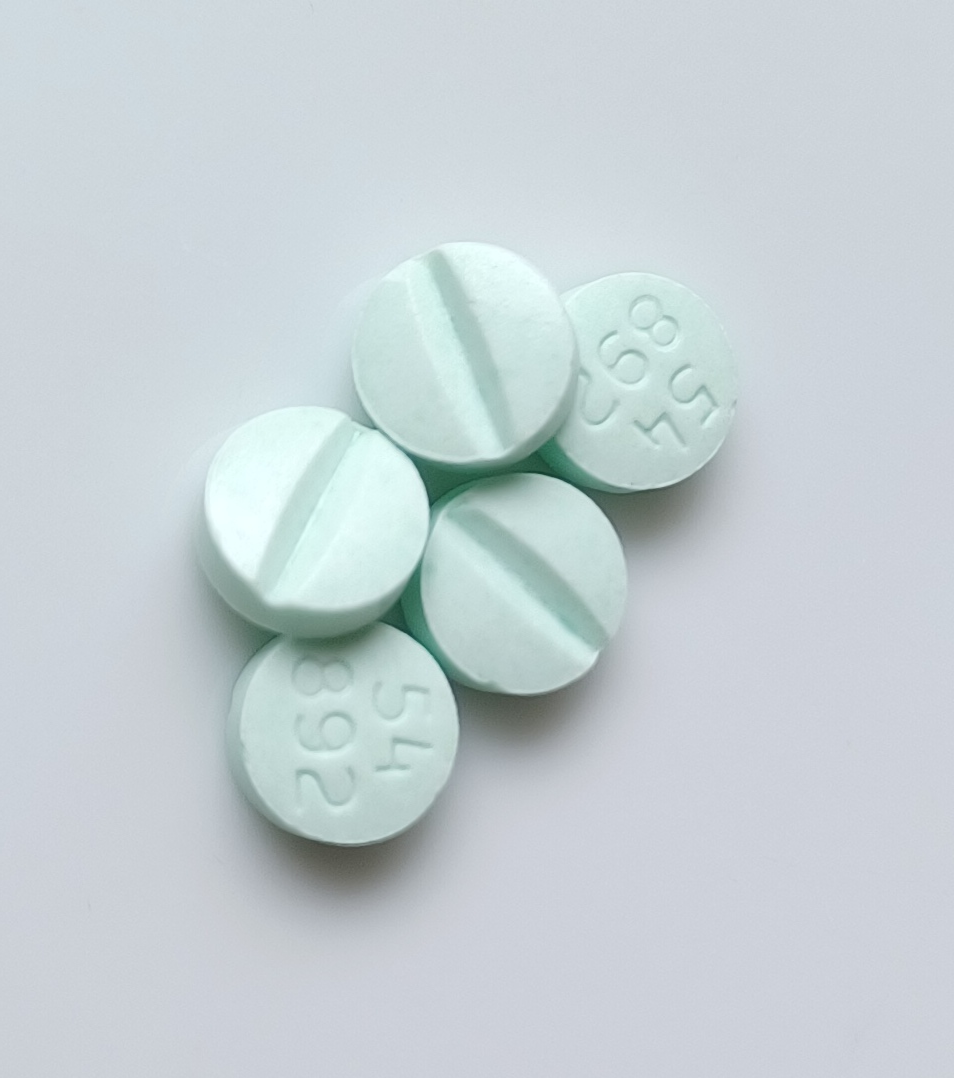
Dexamethasone tablets

Dexamethasone is used to treat many inflammatory and autoimmune disorders, such as rheumatoid arthritis and bronchospasm. Idiopathic thrombocytopenic purpura, a decrease in numbers of platelets due to an immune problem, responds to 40 mg daily for four days; it may be administered in 14-day cycles. It is unclear whether dexamethasone in this condition is significantly better than other glucocorticoids.

It is also given in small amounts before and/or after some forms of dental surgery, such as the extraction of the wisdom teeth, an operation that often causes puffy, swollen cheeks.

Dexamethasone is commonly given as a treatment for croup in children. A single dose can reduce the swelling of the airway to improve breathing and reduce discomfort.

Dexamethasone is sometimes injected into the heel when treating plantar fasciitis or heel pain, sometimes in conjunction with triamcinolone acetonide. There is no evidence that this treatment helps in the long term, however, dexamethasone may provide short-term pain relief.

It may be useful to counteract allergic anaphylactic shock, however this is not usually recommended by clinical guidelines.

It is present in certain eye drops – particularly after eye surgery – and as a nasal spray, and certain ear drops (can be combined with an antibiotic and an antifungal). Dexamethasone intravitreal steroid implants have been approved by the US Food and Drug Administration (FDA) to treat ocular conditions such as diabetic macular edema, central retinal vein occlusion, and uveitis. However, the evidence is poor quality relating to the treatment of uveitis, with the potential side effects (cataract progression and raised intraocular pressure) being significant, and the benefits not certainly greater than standard treatment. Dexamethasone has also been used with antibiotics to treat acute endophthalmitis.

Dexamethasone is used in transvenous screw-in cardiac pacing leads to minimize the inflammatory response of the myocardium. The steroid is released into the myocardium as soon as the screw is extended and can play a significant role in minimizing the acute pacing threshold due to the reduction of inflammatory response. The typical quantity present in a lead tip is less than 1.0 mg.

Dexamethasone may be administered before antibiotics in cases of bacterial meningitis. Gram-negative bacteria — to which the causative agent of bacterial meningitis, Neisseria meningitidis, belongs — have highly immunogenic lipopolysaccharides as a component of their cell membrane and trigger a strong inflammatory response. Pre-administration of dexamethasone before the administration of antibiotics acts to reduce that response, thus reducing hearing loss and neurological damage.

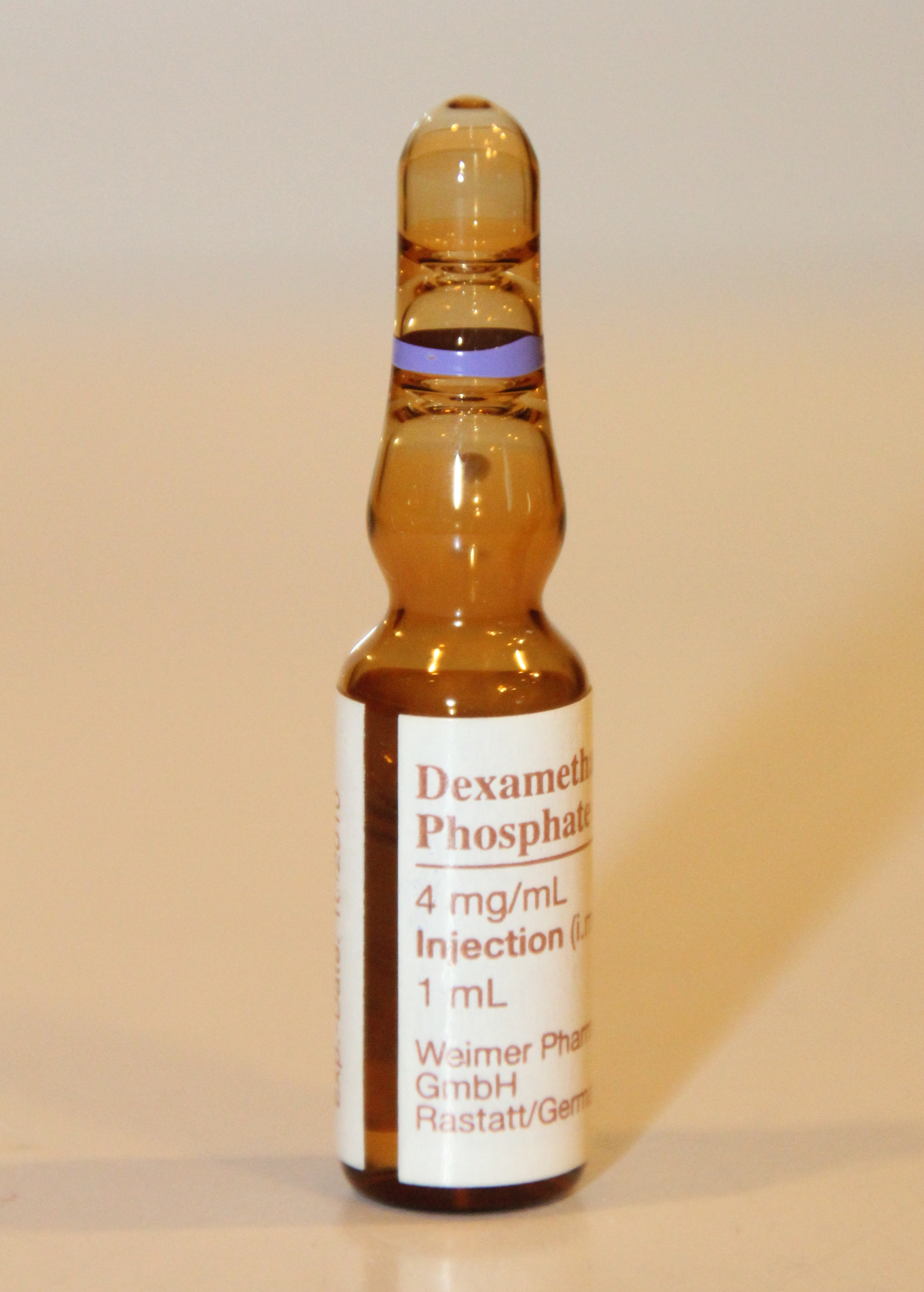
A single ampoule of dexamethasone phosphate for injection

=== Cancer ===
People with cancer undergoing chemotherapy are often given dexamethasone to counteract certain side effects of their antitumor treatments. Dexamethasone can increase the antiemetic effect of 5-HT_{3} receptor antagonists, such as ondansetron. The exact mechanism of this interaction is not well-defined, but it has been theorized that this effect may be due to, among many other causes, inhibition of prostaglandin synthesis, anti-inflammatory effects, immunosuppressive effects, decreased release of endogenous opioids, or a combination of the aforementioned.

In brain tumors (primary or metastatic), dexamethasone is used to counteract the development of edema, which could eventually compress other brain structures. It is also given in cord compression, where a tumor is compressing the spinal cord. Evidence on the safety and efficacy of using dexamethasone to treat malignant brain tumors is not clear.

Dexamethasone is also used as a direct chemotherapeutic agent in certain hematological malignancies, especially in the treatment of multiple myeloma, in which dexamethasone is given alone or in combination with other chemotherapeutic drugs, including most commonly with thalidomide (Thal-dex), lenalidomide, bortezomib (Velcade, Vel-dex), or a combination of doxorubicin (Adriamycin) and vincristine or bortezomib/lenalidomide/dexamethasone.

=== COVID-19 ===
Dexamethasone is recommended by the National Health Service in the UK and the National Institutes of Health (NIH) in the US for people with COVID-19 who need either mechanical ventilation or supplemental oxygen (without ventilation).

The Infectious Diseases Society of America (IDSA) guideline panel suggests the use of glucocorticoids for people with severe COVID-19, defined as people with SpO_{2} ≤94% on room air, and those who require supplemental oxygen, mechanical ventilation, or extracorporeal membrane oxygenation (ECMO). The IDSA recommends against the use of glucocorticoids for those with COVID-19 without hypoxemia requiring supplemental oxygen.

The World Health Organization (WHO) recommends systemic corticosteroids rather than no systemic corticosteroids for the treatment of people with COVID-19 (strong recommendation, based on moderate certainty evidence). The WHO suggests not to use corticosteroids in the treatment of people with non-severe COVID-19 (conditional recommendation, based on low certainty evidence).

The Oxford University RECOVERY Trial issued a press release announcing preliminary results that the drug could reduce deaths by about a third in participants on ventilators and by about a fifth in participants on oxygen; it did not benefit people who did not require respiratory support. A meta-analysis of seven clinical trials of critically ill COVID-19 participants, each treated with one of three different corticosteroids found a statistically significant reduction in death. The largest reduction was obtained with dexamethasone (36% compared to placebo).

In September 2020, the European Medicines Agency (EMA) endorsed the use of dexamethasone in adults and adolescents, from twelve years of age and weighing at least 40 kilograms (88 lb), who require supplemental oxygen therapy. Dexamethasone can be taken by mouth or given as an injection or infusion (drip) into a vein.

In November 2020, the Public Health Agency of Canada's Clinical Pharmacology Task Group recommended dexamethasone for hospitalized patients requiring mechanical ventilation. Although dexamethasone, and other glucocorticoids, reduce mortality in COVID-19 they have also been associated with an increased risk of secondary infections, secondary infections being a significant issue in critically ill COVID-19 patients.

The mechanism of action of dexamethasone involves suppression of late-stage interferon type I programs in severe COVID-19 patients.

=== Surgery ===
Dexamethasone is used fairly regularly, often as a single intravenous dose, during surgery to prevent postoperative nausea and vomiting, manage pain, potentially reduce the amount of pain medication required, and help reduce post-surgery hospitalisation time. The adverse effects of taking steroids after surgery on wound healing, blood sugar levels, and in diabetics are not completely understood; however, dexamethasone likely does not increase the risk of postoperative infections.

=== Endocrine ===
Dexamethasone is the treatment for the very rare disorder of glucocorticoid resistance.

In adrenal insufficiency and Addison's disease, dexamethasone is prescribed when the patient does not respond well to prednisone or methylprednisolone.

It can be used in congenital adrenal hyperplasia in older adolescents and adults to suppress adrenocorticotropic hormone (ACTH) production. It is typically given at night.

=== Pregnancy ===
Dexamethasone may be given to women at risk of delivering prematurely to promote maturation of the fetus's lungs. This administration, given from one day to one week before delivery, has been associated with low birth weight, although not with increased rates of neonatal death.

Dexamethasone has also been used during pregnancy as an off-label prenatal treatment for the symptoms of congenital adrenal hyperplasia (CAH) in female babies. CAH causes a variety of physical abnormalities, notably ambiguous genitalia. Early prenatal CAH treatment has been shown to reduce some CAH symptoms, but it does not treat the underlying congenital disorder. This use is controversial: it is inadequately studied, only around one in ten of the fetuses of women treated are at risk of the condition, and serious adverse events have been documented. Experimental use of dexamethasone in pregnancy for fetal CAH treatment was discontinued in Sweden when one in five cases had adverse events.

A small clinical trial found long-term effects on verbal working memory among the small group of children treated prenatally, but the small number of test subjects means the study cannot be considered definitive.

=== High-altitude illnesses ===
Dexamethasone is used in the treatment of high-altitude cerebral edema (HACE), as well as high-altitude pulmonary edema (HAPE). It is commonly carried on mountain-climbing expeditions to help climbers deal with complications of altitude sickness.

=== Nausea and vomiting ===
Intravenous dexamethasone is effective for the prevention of nausea and vomiting in people who had surgery and whose post-operative pain was treated with long-acting spinal or epidural spinal opioids.

The combination of dexamethasone and a 5-HT_{3} receptor antagonist such as ondansetron is more effective than a 5-HT_{3} receptor antagonist alone in preventing postoperative nausea and vomiting.

=== Sore throat ===
A single dose of dexamethasone or another steroid speeds the improvement of a sore throat.

== Contraindications ==
Contraindications of dexamethasone include, but are not limited to:

- Uncontrolled infections
- Known hypersensitivity to dexamethasone
- Cerebral malaria
- Systemic fungal infection
- Concurrent treatment with live virus vaccines (including smallpox vaccine)

== Adverse effects ==
The exact incidence of the adverse effects of dexamethasone is not available, hence estimates have been made as to the incidence of the adverse effects below based on the adverse effects of related corticosteroids and on available documentation on dexamethasone.

=== Common ===
- Acne
- Amnesia
- Birth defect
- Cataract (in long-term treatment, occurs in about 10% of patients)
- Confusion
- Depression
- Dyspepsia
- Euphoria
- Headaches
- Hiccups (in long-term treatment, occurs in about 11% of patients)
- Hyperglycemia
- Hypertension
- Impaired skin healing and wound repair
- Increased appetite
- Increased risk of viral, bacterial, fungal, and parasitic infections
- Insomnia
- Irritability
- Malaise
- steroid induced Muscle atrophy and myopathy
- Nausea
- Ocular hypertension
- Osteoporosis
- Vertigo
- Vomiting
- Weight gain

=== Unknown frequency ===
- Abdominal distension
- Adrenal suppression
- Allergic reactions (including anaphylaxis)
- Arterial thrombosis
- Aspergillosis
- Bruising
- Candidiasis
- Cardiomyopathy
- Cleft palate
- Corneal or scleral thinning
- Cushing's syndrome
- Edema
- Esophageal ulcer
- Facial plethora
- Glaucoma
- Growth stunting (in children)
- Herpes zoster
- Hypernatremia
- Hypertriglyceridemia
- Hypocalcemia
- Hypokalemia
- Intracranial hypertension (with long-term treatment)
- Leukocytosis
- Mania
- Mucormycosis
- Pancreatitis (inflammation of the pancreas)
- Papilledema
- Peptic ulcer
- Perineal or vulvar pruritus (upon IV administration)
- Protein catabolism (causing nitrogen depletion)
- Psychological dependence
- Psychosis
- Seizures
- Skin atrophy
- Striae
- Telangiectasia
- Thromboembolism
- Venous thrombosis
- Vertebral collapse

=== Withdrawal ===
Sudden withdrawal after long-term treatment with corticosteroids can lead to

- Adrenal insufficiency
- Arthralgia
- Conjunctivitis
- Death
- Fever
- Hypotension
- Myalgia
- Nodule (medicine) (painful, itchy skin condition)
- Rhinitis
- Weight loss

== Interactions ==
Known drug interactions include:

- Inducers of hepatic microsomal enzymes such as barbiturates, phenytoin, and rifampicin can reduce the half-life of dexamethasone.
- Cotreatment with oral contraceptives can increase its volume of distribution.

== Pharmacology ==
=== Pharmacodynamics ===
As a glucocorticoid, dexamethasone is an agonist of the glucocorticoid receptor (GR). It is highly selective for the GR over the mineralocorticoid receptor (MR), and in relation to this, has minimal mineralocorticoid activity. This is in contrast to endogenous corticosteroids like cortisol, which bind to and activate both the GR and the MR. Dexamethasone is 25 times more potent than hydrocortisone (cortisol) as a glucocorticoid. Its affinity (K_{i}) for the GR was about 1.2 nM in one study.

The activation of the GR by dexamethasone results in dose-dependent suppression of the hypothalamic–pituitary–adrenal axis (HPA axis) and of production of endogenous corticosteroids by the adrenal glands, thereby reducing circulating endogenous concentrations of corticosteroids like cortisol and corticosterone.

Dexamethasone poorly penetrates the blood–brain barrier into the central nervous system due to binding to P-glycoprotein. However, higher doses of dexamethasone override the export capacity of P-glycoprotein and enter the brain to produce central activation of GRs. In conjunction with the suppression of endogenous corticosteroids by dexamethasone, this results in skewed ratios of activation of peripheral versus central GRs as well as skewed ratios of activation of GRs versus MRs when compared to non-synthetic corticosteroids. These differences can have significant clinical relevance.

== Chemistry ==
Dexamethasone is a synthetic pregnane corticosteroid and derivative of cortisol (hydrocortisone) and is also known as 1-dehydro-9α-fluoro-16α-methylhydrocortisone or as 9α-fluoro-11β,17α,21-trihydroxy-16α-methylpregna-1,4-diene-3,20-dione. The molecular and crystal structure of dexamethasone has been determined by X-ray crystallography. It is a stereoisomer of betamethasone, the two compounds differing only in the spatial configuration of the methyl group at position 16 (see steroid nomenclature).

=== Synthesis ===
To synthesize dexamethasone, 16β-methylprednisolone acetate is dehydrated to the 9,11-dehydro derivative. This is then reacted with a source of hypobromite, such as basic N-bromosuccinimide, to form the 9α-bromo-11β-hydrin derivative, which is then ring-closed to an epoxide. A ring-opening reaction with hydrogen fluoride in tetrahydrofuran gives dexamethasone.

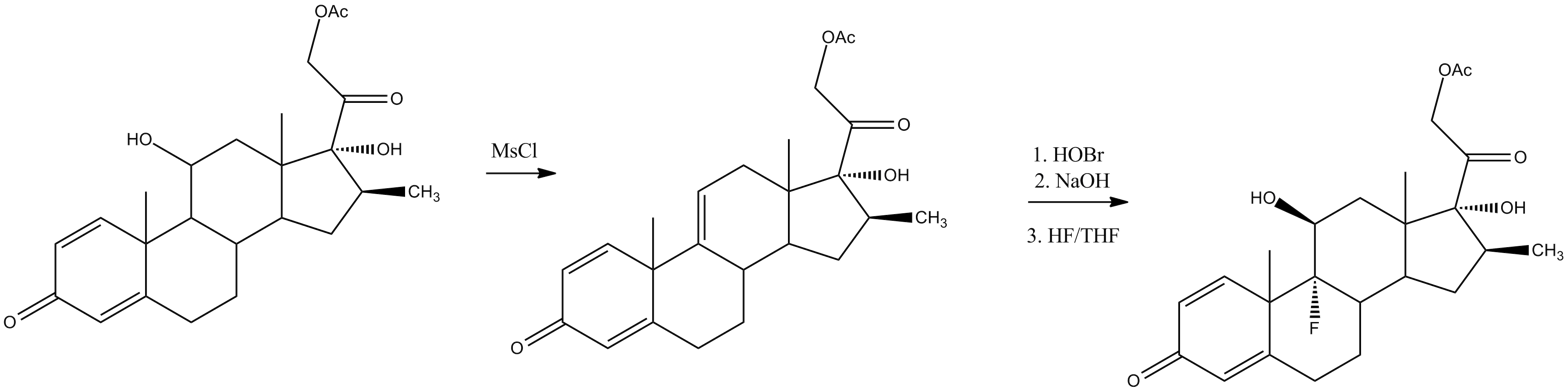
Dexamethasone synthesis

=== Spectroscopy ===
In chemistry, spectroscopy is used to analyze products of reactions. To understand if dexamethasone is synthesized from a reaction, spectroscopy must be taken and compared to the literature spectrum. There are multiple spectroscopy analyses that can be taken including ^{1}H NMR, ^{13}C NMR, IR, Mass spectrometry, and UV/vis spectroscopy.

NMR spectrum for dexamethasone

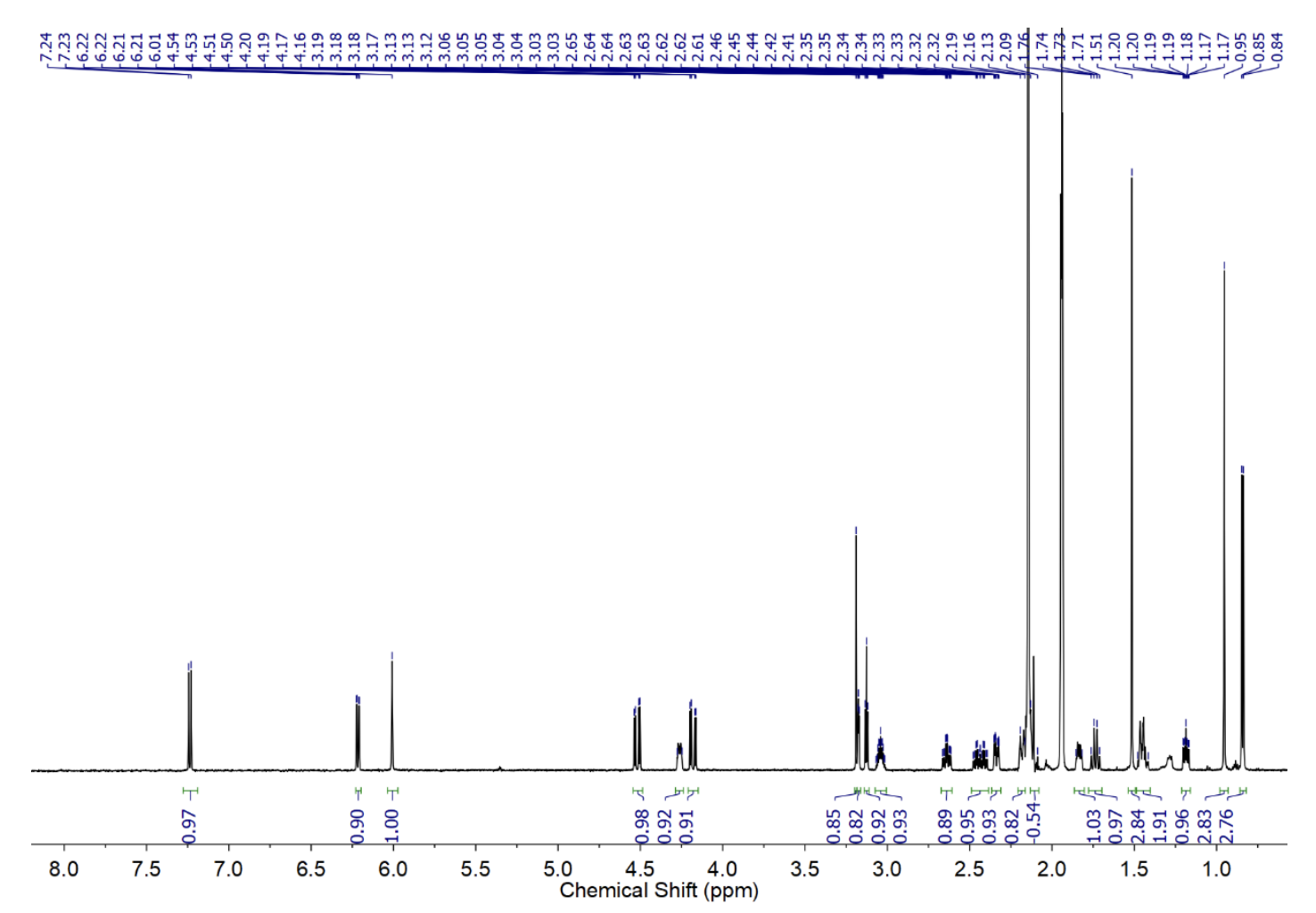
^{1}H NMR spectrum for dexamethasone

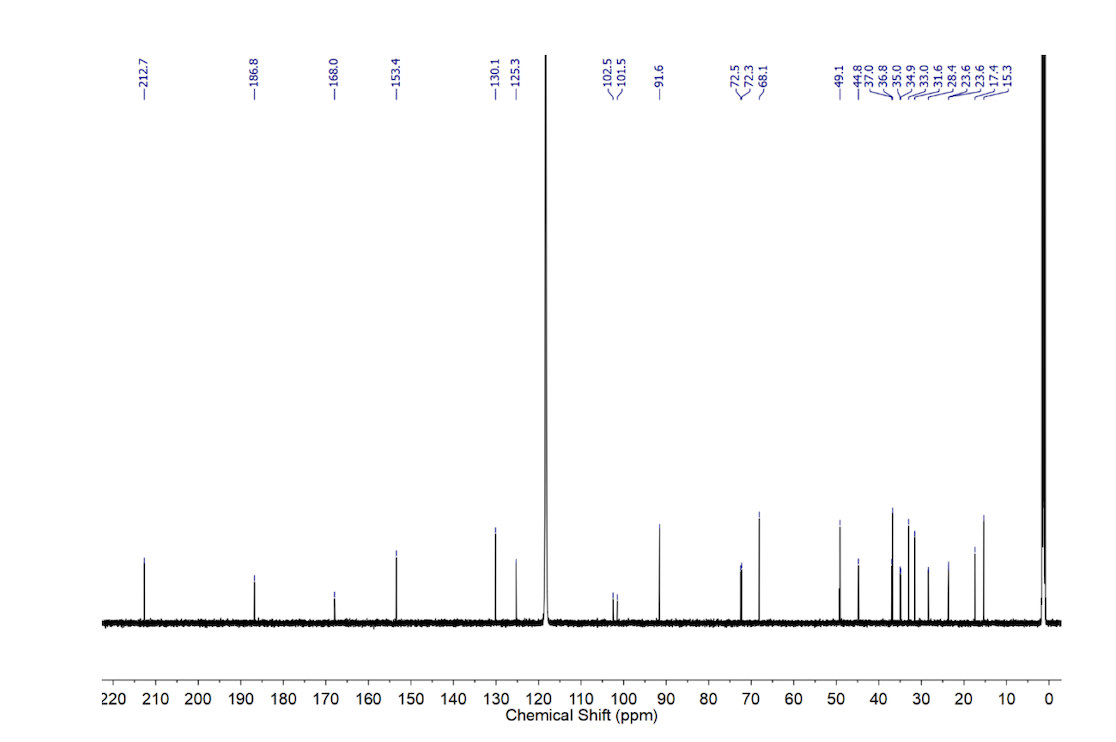
^{13}C NMR spectrum for dexamethasone
The NMR spectrum shown above can be used to compare to product synthesized through reactions to figure out if Dexamethasone was synthesized. ^{1}H NMR, among other things, shows that there are 29 hydrogens and ^{13}C NMR shows that there are 22 carbons.
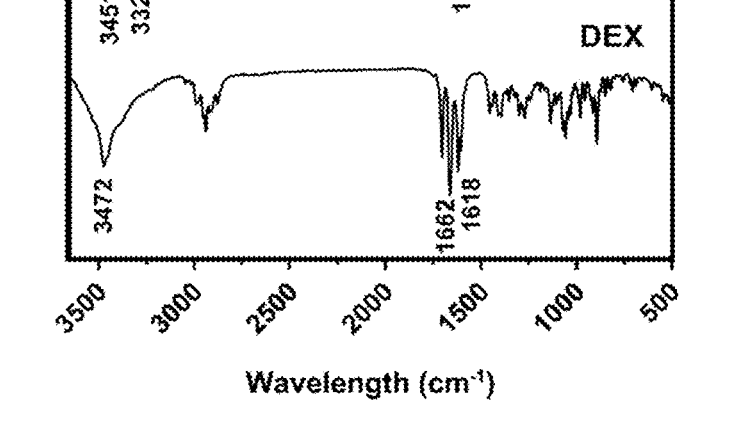
Infrared spectrum of dexamethasone

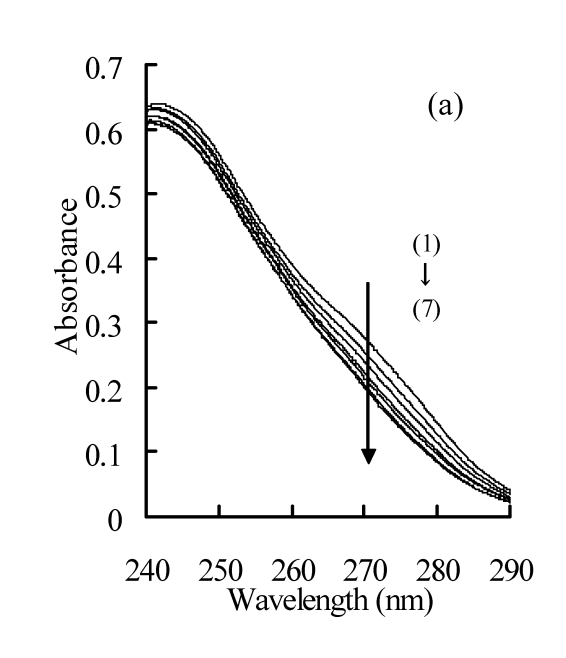
UV-vis spectrum of dexamethasone

Using IR spectroscopy, the peaks show the functional groups found in the molecule. Peaks at 3472, 1662, and 1618 represent alcohol, aldehyde, and alkene functional groups. UV-vis spectroscopy is another way to analyze a product to figure out what it is.

Finally, mass spectroscopy showed peaks at: 393.1, 355.2 147.1 m/z. The peak at 393.1 m/z is the peak for dexamethasone as its molecular weight is 392.46 m/z.

=== Analogues ===
A notable related compound is the membrane-limited dexamethasone-BSA.

== History ==
Dexamethasone was first synthesized by Philip Showalter Hench in 1957. It was introduced for medical use in 1958.

On 16 June 2020, the RECOVERY Trial announced preliminary results stating that dexamethasone improves survival rates of hospitalized patients with COVID-19 receiving oxygen or on a ventilator. Benefits were only observed in patients requiring respiratory support; those who did not require breathing support saw a worse survival rate than the control group, although the difference may have been due to chance. A preprint containing the full dataset was published on 22 June 2020, and demand for dexamethasone surged after the publication of the preprint. The preliminary report was published in The New England Journal of Medicine on 18 July 2020. The final report was published in February 2021.

The World Health Organization (WHO) states that dexamethasone should be reserved for seriously ill and critical patients receiving COVID-19 treatment in a hospital setting, and the WHO Director-General stated that "WHO emphasizes that dexamethasone should only be used for patients with severe or critical disease, under close clinical supervision. There is no evidence this drug works for patients with mild disease or as a preventative measure, and it could cause harm." In July 2020, the WHO stated they were in the process of updating treatment guidelines to include dexamethasone or other steroids. In September 2020, the WHO released updated guidance on using corticosteroids for COVID-19.

In July 2020, the European Medicines Agency (EMA) started reviewing results from the RECOVERY study arm that involved the use of dexamethasone in the treatment of patients with COVID-19 admitted to the hospital to provide an opinion on the results and in particular the potential use of dexamethasone for the treatment of adults with COVID-19. In September 2020, the EMA received an application for marketing authorization of dexamethasone for COVID-19.

== Society and culture ==
=== Price ===
Dexamethasone is inexpensive. In the United States a month of medication is typically priced less than US$25. In India, a course of treatment for preterm labor is about US$0.50. The drug is available in most areas of the world.

=== Nonmedical use ===
Dexamethasone is given to prostituted Bangladeshi children, causing weight gain aimed at making them appear older and healthier to customers and police.

Dexamethasone and most glucocorticoids are banned by sporting bodies including the World Anti-Doping Agency.

== Veterinary use ==
Combined with marbofloxacin CAS number 115550-35-1and clotrimazole, dexamethasone is available under the name Aurizon, CAS number 50-02-2, and used to treat difficult ear infections, especially in dogs. It can also be combined with trichlormethiazide to treat horses with swelling of distal limbs and general bruising. Dexamethasone is also used for emergency patients with hypoadrenocorticism as the drug does not interfere with adrenocorticotropic hormone stimulation testing.
