= Membrane glucocorticoid receptor =

Membrane glucocorticoid receptors (mGRs) are a group of receptors which bind and are activated by glucocorticoids such as cortisol and corticosterone, as well as certain exogenous glucocorticoids such as dexamethasone. Unlike the classical nuclear glucocorticoid receptor (GR), which mediates its effects via genomic mechanisms, mGRs are cell surface receptors which rapidly alter cell signaling via modulation of intracellular signaling cascades. The identities of the mGRs have yet to be fully elucidated, but are thought to include membrane-associated classical GRs as well as yet-to-be-characterized G protein-coupled receptors (GPCRs). Rapid effects of dexamethasone were found not be reversed by the GR antagonist mifepristone, indicating additional receptors besides just the classical GR.

mGRs have been implicated in the rapid effects of glucocorticoids in the early central stress response via modulating neuronal activity in the hypothalamus, hippocampus, amygdala, and prefrontal cortex, among other areas. In accordance, glucocorticoids are known to affect cognition, stress-adaptive behavior, and neuroendocrine output (e.g., suppression of oxytocin and vasopressin secretion) within minutes. mGRs appear to be partially involved in the anti-inflammatory and immunosuppressant effects of glucocorticoids. mGRs are present in and appear to regulate many major bodily systems and organs, including the cardiovascular, immune, endocrine, and nervous systems, smooth and skeletal muscle, the liver, and fat tissue. mGRs appear to cooperate with, complement, and synergize with classical nuclear GRs in various ways.

== See also ==
- Membrane steroid receptor
- Dexamethasone-BSA
