= Membrane mineralocorticoid receptor =

Membrane mineralocorticoid receptors (mMRs) or membrane aldosterone receptors are a group of receptors which bind and are activated by mineralocorticoids such as aldosterone. Unlike the classical nuclear mineralocorticoid receptor (MR), which mediates its effects via genomic mechanisms, mMRs are cell surface receptors which rapidly alter cell signaling via modulation of intracellular signaling cascades. The identities of the mMRs have yet to be fully elucidated, but are thought to include membrane-associated classical MRs as well as yet-to-be-characterized G protein-coupled receptors (GPCRs). Rapid effects of aldosterone were found not be reversed by the MR antagonist spironolactone, indicating additional receptors besides just the classical MR. It has been estimated that as much as 50% of the rapid actions of aldosterone are mediated by mMRs that are not the classical MR, based on findings of insensitivity to classical mR antagonists.

mMRs, along with membrane glucocorticoid receptors (mGRs), have been implicated in the rapid effects of mineralocorticoids in the early central stress response. Aldosterone has been found to have rapid non-genomic effects in the central nervous system, the kidneys, the cardiovascular system, and the colon.

GPER, also known as GPR30, binds and is activated by aldosterone, and may be considered an mMR, although it also binds and is activated by estradiol and is generally described as a membrane estrogen receptor (mER).

== See also ==
- Membrane steroid receptor
