= Congenital adrenal hyperplasia due to 3β-hydroxysteroid dehydrogenase deficiency =

- Other names: CAH due to 3-beta-hydroxysteroid dehydrogenase deficiency
- Cortisol
- Specialty: Endocrinology

Congenital adrenal hyperplasia due to 3β-hydroxysteroid dehydrogenase deficiency is an uncommon form of congenital adrenal hyperplasia (CAH) resulting from a mutation in the gene for one of the key enzymes in cortisol synthesis by the adrenal gland, 3β-hydroxysteroid dehydrogenase (3β-HSD) type II (HSD3B2). As a result, higher levels of 17α-hydroxypregnenolone appear in the blood with adrenocorticotropic hormone (ACTH) challenge, which stimulates adrenal corticosteroid synthesis.

There is a wide spectrum of clinical presentations of 3β-HSD CAH, from mild to severe forms. The uncommon severe form results from a complete loss of enzymatic activity and manifests itself in infancy as salt wasting due to the loss of mineralocorticoids. Milder forms resulting from incomplete loss of 3β-HSD type II function do not present with adrenal crisis, but can still produce virilization of genetically female infants and undervirilization of genetically male infants. As a result, this form of primary hypoadrenalism is the only form of CAH that can cause ambiguous genitalia in both genetic sexes.

== Pathophysiology ==
3β-HSD II mediates three parallel dehydrogenase/isomerase reactions in the adrenals that convert Δ^{4} to Δ^{5} steroids: pregnenolone to progesterone, 17α-hydroxypregnenolone to 17α-hydroxyprogesterone, and dehydroepiandrosterone (DHEA) to androstenedione. 3β-HSD II also mediates an alternate route of testosterone synthesis from androstenediol in the testes. 3β-HSD deficiency results in large elevations of pregnenolone, 17α-hydroxypregnenolone, and DHEA.

However, complexity arises from the presence of a second 3β-HSD isoform (HSD3B1) coded by a different gene, expressed in the liver and placenta, and unaffected in 3β-HSD-deficient CAH. The presence of this second enzyme has two clinical consequences. First, 3β-HSD II can convert enough of the excess 17α-hydroxypregnenolone to 17α-hydroxyprogesterone to produce 17α-hydroxyprogesterone levels suggestive of common 21-hydroxylase deficient CAH. Measurement of the other affected steroids distinguishes the two. Second, 3β-HSD I can convert enough DHEA to testosterone to moderately virilize a genetically female fetus.

=== Mineralocorticoids ===
The mineralocorticoid aspect of severe 3β-HSD CAH is similar to those of 21-hydroxylase deficiency. Like other enzymes involved in early stages of both aldosterone and cortisol synthesis, the severe form of 3β-HSD deficiency can result in life-threatening salt-wasting in early infancy. Salt-wasting is managed acutely with saline and high-dose hydrocortisone, and long-term fludrocortisone.

=== Sex steroid ===
The sex steroid consequences of severe 3β-HSD CAH are unique among the congenital adrenal hyperplasias: it is the only form of CAH that can produce ambiguity in both sexes. As with 21-hydroxylase-deficient CAH, the degree of severity can determine the magnitude of over- or undervirilization.

In an XX (genetically female) fetus, elevated amounts of DHEA can produce moderate virilization by conversion in the liver to testosterone. Virilization of genetic females is partial, often mild, and rarely raises assignment questions. The issues surrounding corrective surgery of the virilized female genitalia are the same as for moderate 21-hydroxylase deficiency but surgery is rarely considered desirable.

The extent to which mild 3β-HSD CAH can cause early appearance of pubic hair and other aspects of hyperandrogenism in later childhood or adolescence is unsettled. Early reports suggesting that mild forms of 3β-HSD CAH comprised significant proportions of girls with premature pubic hair or older women with hirsutism have not been confirmed and it now appears that premature pubarche in childhood and hirsutism after adolescence are not common manifestations of 3β-HSD CAH.

Undervirilization of genetic males with 3β-HSD CAH occurs because synthesis of testosterone is impaired in both adrenals and testes. Although DHEA is elevated, it is a weak androgen and too little testosterone is produced in the liver to offset the deficiency of testicular testosterone. The degree of undervirilization is more variable, from mild to severe. Management issues are those of an undervirilized male with normal sensitivity to testosterone.

If the infant boy is only mildly undervirilized, the hypospadias can be surgically repaired, testes brought into the scrotum, and testosterone supplied at puberty.

Management decisions are more difficult for a moderately or severely undervirilized genetic male whose testes are in the abdomen and whose genitalia look at least as much female as male. Male sex can be assigned and major reconstructive surgery done to close the midline of the perineum and move the testes into a constructed scrotum. Female sex can be assigned and the testes removed and vagina enlarged surgically. A recently advocated third choice would be to assign either sex and defer surgery to adolescence. Each approach carries its own disadvantages and risks.

== Diagnosis ==
Like the other forms of CAH, suspicion of severe 3β-HSD CAH is usually raised by the appearance of the genitalia at birth or by development of a salt-wasting crisis in the first month of life. These severe, classical forms can be observed at birth by the following symptoms: boys may not develop masculine characteristics fully, while girls may have an enlarged clitoris. Both boys and girls may have problems with retaining salt (sodium) in their bodies. If the condition appears later in life (late onset, non-classical forms), there may be a short period of rapid growth. Still, ultimately, the individual may end up being shorter than expected because their bones mature faster. It is common for people with this condition to have difficulty getting pregnant or fathering children. In females, there may be signs of hyperandrogenism. The diagnosis is usually confirmed by the distinctive pattern of adrenal steroids: elevated pregnenolone, 17α-hydroxypregnenolone, DHEA, and renin. In clinical circumstances this form of CAH has sometimes been difficult to distinguish from the more common 21-hydroxylase deficient CAH because of the 17α-hydroxypregnenolone elevation, or from simple premature adrenarche because of the DHEA elevation.

== Management ==
Some of the childhood management issues are similar those of 21-hydroxylase deficiency:

- Replacing mineralocorticoid with fludrocortisone
- Suppressing DHEA and replacing cortisol with glucocorticoid
- Providing extra glucocorticoid for stress
- Close monitoring and perhaps other adjunctive measures to optimize growth
- Deciding whether surgical repair of virilized female genitalia is warranted

However, unlike 21-hydroxylase CAH, children with 3β-HSD CAH may be unable to produce adequate amounts of testosterone (boys) or estradiol (girls) to effect normal pubertal changes. Replacement testosterone or estrogen and progesterone can be initiated at adolescence and continued throughout adult life. Fertility may be impaired by the difficulty of providing appropriate sex hormone levels in the gonads even though the basic anatomy is present.

== See also ==
- Inborn errors of steroid metabolism
- Adrenal insufficiency
- Disorders of sexual development
- Intersexuality, pseudohermaphroditism, and ambiguous genitalia
