= Late onset congenital adrenal hyperplasia =

- Other names: Nonclassic onset congenital adrenal hyperplasia
- Frequency: 0.1%–2%

Late onset congenital adrenal hyperplasia (LOCAH), also known as nonclassical congenital adrenal hyperplasia (NCCAH or NCAH), is a milder form of congenital adrenal hyperplasia (CAH), a group of autosomal recessive disorders characterized by impaired cortisol synthesis that leads to variable degrees of postnatal androgen excess.

The causes of LOCAH are the same as of classical CAH, and in the majority of the cases are the mutations in the CYP21A2 gene resulting in corresponding activity changes in the associated P450c21 (21-hydroxylase) enzyme which ultimately leads to excessive androgen production. Other causes, albeit less frequent, are mutations in genes affecting other enzymes involved in steroid metabolism, like 11β-hydroxylase or 3β-hydroxysteroid dehydrogenase. It has a prevalence between 0.1% and 2% depending on population, and is one of the most common autosomal recessive genetic diseases in humans. The pathophysiology is complex and not all individuals are symptomatic.

== Presentation ==
Patients with LOCAH usually present with signs of hyperandrogenism, rather than of glucocorticoid deficiency, a condition characterized by inadequate cortisol production. Cortisol synthesis impairment is mild but clinically silent (asymptomatic). LOCAH patients usually have the same baseline but lower peak cortisol levels comparing to healthy controls. Flatter diurnal cortisol slopes contribute to stress-related dysregulation of central and peripheral circadian mechanisms with negative health outcomes.

Due to hyperandrogenism, females may present with symptoms like hirsutism, oligomenorrhea, acne, infertility, and androgenetic alopecia.

Males are generally asymptomatic, but may present with acne, early balding, chronic prostatitis and/or chronic pelvic pain syndrome. Rare presentation of testicular adrenal rest tumors which do not affect fertility and do not require regular ultrasound examinations of the scrotum is also possible.

While symptoms are usually diagnosed after puberty, children may present with premature adrenarche.

The degree of hormonal disorder in patients with LOCAH is relatively mild. However, alterations in the hypothalamic–pituitary–adrenal axis (HPA axis) are present even in this mild form of the disease and might contribute to psychiatric vulnerability.

== Molecular genetics ==
LOCAH is most commonly attributed to mutations in the CYP21A2 gene, which encodes the 21-hydroxylase enzyme. Cases of LOCAH due to deficiencies in other enzymes that are known causes of CAH (3β-hydroxysteroid dehydrogenase, steroid 11β-hydroxylase, etc.) are rare and have no established prevalence estimates.

Several severe mutations have been associated with LOCAH: the deletion of the CYP21A2 gene, small gene conversions, the p. I172N (rs6475, c.518T>A, CYP21A2*11) mutation, the c.293-13A/C>G (rs6467, CYP21A2*9) mutation, and the p.Gln318Stop (p.Q318X, rs7755898, c.952C>T, CYP21A2*17) mutation. Besides that, LOCAH due to 21-hydroxylase deficiency can be caused by duplications of CYP21A1P pseudogene and C4B gene. Due to the high degree of homology between the CYP21A2 gene and the CYP21A1P pseudogene, and the complexity of the locus, research on the sequencing level can be difficult. A 2021 study showed that mild genotypes associated with LOCAH have a low concordance rate with those phenotypes, probably due to the complex characteristics of 21-hydroxylase genotyping and the limitation of using massive parallel sequencing alone without combining with other comprehensive methods.

The following three mutations to the CYP21A2 gene have been found to result in a moderate reduction in enzyme activity associated with that allele (20–60% residual activity), and are associated with LOCAH:

- p.V281L (rs6471, c.844G>C, CYP21A2*15);
- p.P453S (rs6445, c.1360C>T, CYP21A2*19);
- p.P30L (rs9378251, c.92C>T, CYP21A2*8).

A point mutation in exon 7 of CYP21A2, (p.V281L), is commonly found in LOCAH-associated alleles. Carriers for this mutation retain 20%–50% of 21-hydroxylase activity, but are at higher risk of symptoms of androgen excess than carriers of the severe mutations, and had higher adrenocorticotropic hormone (ACTH) stimulated 17α-hydroxyprogesterone, suggesting that the mutant protein V281L enzyme co-expressed with the wild-type (healthy) enzyme resulted in an apparent dominant negative effect on the enzymatic activity.

The particularly mild clinical symptoms of LOCAH such as hyperandrogenism, hirsutism and acne or infertility overlap with other diseases such as polyendocrine metabolic ovarian syndrome (PMOS). Biochemical parameters like 17α-hydroxyprogesterone may not be elevated in very mild cases of LOCAH, and may vary between labs, which makes interpretation difficult. ACTH stimulation tests may not be available in all institutions, depending on the availability of the injectable adrenocorticotropic hormone medication. For this reason, comprehensive CYP21A2 genotyping (rather than variant-specific assays alone) is a good way to exclude or confirm 21-hydroxylase deficiency and heterozygosity (carrier) status. Genetic testing can be used to exclude false positive diagnosis based on biochemical parameters alone, even with ACTH stimulation, since elevated 17-OHP levels may be also caused by ovarian or adrenal tumors, rather than by the variants in the CYP21A2 gene.

== Diagnosis ==
Originally characterized in 1957 by French biochemist Jacques Decourt, LOCAH differs from classical CAH in that it does not cause atypical neonatal genital morphology, is not life-threatening and presents after birth. Unlike classical CAH, LOCAH generally cannot be reliably detected with neonatal screening. Many individuals (both male and female) present no symptoms during childhood and adolescence and only become aware of the possibility of LOCAH due to the diagnosis of another family member. An estimated 90% of women with LOCAH never receive a diagnosis. In young females, premature pubarche is generally the first symptom to present. The earliest known diagnosis was in a 6 month old female who developed pubic hair. Additional symptoms include acne, menstrual irregularities and hirsutism in females as well as alopecia in males. LOCAH is often misdiagnosed as polyendocrine metabolic ovarian syndrome (PMOS).

LOCAH is often diagnosed in the context of infertility assessment in women. During the follicular phase of the menstrual cycle, progesterone accumulates along with 17α-hydroxyprogesterone which can thin the endometrium and change cervical mucus in a manner similar to the effect of progestogen contraceptives, interferes with the normal menstrual cycle, which can lead to oligomenorrhea or amenorrhea and impairs sperm penetration. Abnormal endometrial development leads to decreased uterine receptivity, which also contributes to infertility. Once attempting to conceive, most women with LOCAH will become pregnant within a year with or without treatment, but women with LOCAH have an increased risk of miscarriages.

The diagnostic procedure varies according to the specific enzyme deficiency causing LOCAH and the precise serum androgen levels required for diagnosis are the subject to variance from different measurement methods, refinement in specific cases and are under active research. Some protocols are based on measuring 17α-hydroxyprogesterone levels, with or without ACTH stimulation test.

=== 21-Hydroxylase deficiency ===
==== Screening ====
The condition of 21-hydroxylase deficiency is screened by measuring serum levels of 17α-hydroxyprogesterone (17-OHP) in the morning and between day 3 and 5 of the menstrual cycle (for females) to reduce the possibility of false positive results. 17-OHP is used as a marker of the 21-hydroxylase enzyme activity since the 1980s. The cutoff basal 17-OHP value is matter of debate. Most commonly, the value of 2.0 ng/mL is used, but a value of 1.7 ng/mL provides better selectivity. Most research on the biochemical diagnosis of LOCAH relied on direct immunoassays, such as radioimmunoassays or time-resolved fluorescence assay to measure 17-OHP, therefore, cross-reactivity and reliability problems of these methods might have caused differences in the 17-OHP cutoff values recommended, so the use of liquid chromatography–mass spectrometry aims to improve the accuracy of 17-OHP measurement and increase diagnostic quality of LOCAH. Randomly timed measurements of 17-OHP have not been shown to be useful for screening since they are often normal and are known to be very high in the luteal phase of the female menstrual cycle. After basal levels have been measured, confirmation is done by administering ACTH, and comparing 17-OHP pre and post test. 17-OHP levels over 10 ng/mL at the 60th minute post stimulation is considered diagnostic for LOCAH.

==== Androgen backdoor pathway ====
In 21-hydroxylase deficiency, especially in mild cases (LOCAH), the androgen "backdoor" pathway may be the reason of androgen excess. This backdoor pathway is not always considered in the clinical evaluation of patients with hyperandrogenism conditions such as LOCAH and may be a source of diagnostic pitfalls and confusion. One case study demonstrated the importance of considering serum 5α-dihydrotestosterone (DHT) levels and the androgen backdoor pathway in a LOCAH diagnosis that would have not been apparent from testosterone levels alone.

=== 11β-Hydroxylase deficiency ===
The activity of 11β-hydroxylase can be determined by observing the basal 11-deoxycortisol level. A level over 10 ng/mL, indicates followup with ACTH stimulation test. The 60th minute post-stimulation 11-deoxycortisol levels higher than 18 ng/mL are diagnostic of LOCAH.

=== 3β-Hydroxysteroid dehydrogenase deficiency ===
The activity of 3β-hydroxysteroid dehydrogenase can be determined by observing the basal 17α-hydroxypregnenolone level. A level above 30 ng/mL and 17α-hydroxypregnenolone/cortisol ratio above 10 SD are diagnostic of LOCAH.

== Management ==
Management and treatment of LOCAH is case specific and the application of glucocorticoid treatment is not standard as it is in classical CAH. LOCAH is not a life-threatening medical condition and the risks of treatment given prenatally or to asymptomatic children outweigh potential benefits. In appropriate cases, glucocorticoids (usually hydrocortisone in children) are administered to suppress secretion of corticotropin releasing hormone (CRH) produced by hypothalamus and of adrenocorticotropic hormone (ACTH) produced by pituitary gland. This suppression will reduce concentration in blood of sex steroids produced by adrenal glands. Some of the main considerations in treatment include the watchful waiting of symptom severity as well as adverse responses to glucocorticoids administered as drugs, seen in patient bone mineral density, height and weight. For women, an oral contraceptive pill and androgen blockers such as spironolactone or cyproterone acetate are alternatives to glucocorticoids for managing symptoms of androgen excess. There is still debate whether miscarriage rates in women with LOCAH are influenced by hydrocortisone treatment.

== Prevalence ==
According to haplotype association studies, the prevalence of LOCAH in the US Ashkenazi Jew and Caucasian populations is estimated to be 1:500 to 1:1000, but in people with a high rate of marriage between relatives, the prevalence rate is as high as 1:50 to 1:100. A 2017 CYP21A2 genotype analysis predicted that the total frequency of LOCAH in the general population of the United States is about 1:200 (95% confidence level, from 1:100 to 1:280).

According to a 2017 meta-analysis, the prevalence of LOCAH among women with signs and symptoms of androgen excess is 4.2% globally, and between 1% and 10% depending on the ethnicity of the population being studied.

=== As an intersex condition ===
Anne Fausto-Sterling, an American sexologist, in a 2000 book "Sexing the Body" estimated that people with intersex conditions account for 1.7% of the general population. Of these intersex individuals, according to Fausto-Sterling, 88% have LOCAH. This estimate is cited by prominent intersex advocacy and human rights organizations.

Leonard Sax, a family physician and author of gender essentialist books, disputes these figures in a review published in 2002 in The Journal of Sex Research, arguing for a narrow, clinically-focused definition of intersex that does not include LOCAH.

== See also ==
- Congenital adrenal hyperplasia due to 17α-hydroxylase deficiency
- Lipoid congenital adrenal hyperplasia
