= Lipoid congenital adrenal hyperplasia =

- Other names: Congenital lipoid adrenal hyperplasia due to StAR deficiency
- Lipoid congenital adrenal hyperplasia is inherited in an autosomal recessive manner

Lipoid congenital adrenal hyperplasia is an endocrine disorder that is an uncommon and potentially lethal form of congenital adrenal hyperplasia (CAH). It arises from defects in the earliest stages of steroid hormone synthesis: the transport of cholesterol into the mitochondria and the conversion of cholesterol to pregnenolone—the first step in the synthesis of all steroid hormones. Lipoid CAH causes mineralocorticoid deficiency in affected infants and children. Male infants are severely undervirilized causing their external genitalia to look feminine. The adrenals are large and filled with lipid globules derived from cholesterol.

== Presentation ==
Problems that emerge in persons with lipoid CAH can be divided into:

1. mineralocorticoid deficiency,
2. glucocorticoid deficiency,
3. sex steroid deficiency, and
4. damage to gonads caused by lipid accumulation.

=== Mineralocorticoid deficiency ===
Most infants born with lipoid CAH have had genitalia female enough that no disease was suspected at birth. Because the adrenal zona glomerulosa is undifferentiated and inactive before delivery, it is undamaged at birth and can make aldosterone for a while, so the eventual salt-wasting crisis develops more gradually and variably than with severe 21-hydroxylase-deficient CAH.

Most come to medical attention between 2 weeks and 3 months of age, when after a period of poor weight gain and vomiting, they were found to be dehydrated, with severe hyponatremia, hyperkalemia, and metabolic acidosis ("Addisonian or adrenal crisis"). Renin but not aldosterone is elevated. Many infants born with this condition died before a method for diagnosis was recognized for proper treatment to begin. In some cases, the condition is more mild with signs and symptoms of mineralocorticoid and glucocorticoid deficiency appearing after months or even years (late onset).

=== Glucocorticoid deficiency ===
Insufficiency of cortisol synthesis has several consequences. Elevated ACTH is accompanied by and contributes to marked hyperpigmentation even in the newborn period. An inadequate cortisol response to stress undoubtedly hastens the deterioration as dehydration develops, can cause hypoglycemia, and contributes to the high mortality rate in infancy.

=== Sex steroid deficiency and gonadal damage ===
==== In development ====
Prenatal production of DHEA by the fetal adrenal glands is impaired, resulting in abnormally low maternal estriol levels by the middle of pregnancy. The effects of impaired progesterone production from placental cells that originate from the affected baby (trophoblasts) in the case of lipoid CAH due to P450scc deficiency are still unclear, but are thought to result in miscarriage when the deficit in the enzyme's activity are severe enough. The results of reduced or absent testosterone output by fetal Leydig cells in the male is detailed below.

==== Female patients ====
Genetic XX females with lipoid CAH are born with normal external and internal pelvic anatomy. They come to medical attention when they develop a salt-wasting adrenal crisis or other signs of progressive adrenal insufficiency.

With glucocorticoid and mineralocorticoid replacement, these girls will reach the age of puberty. Because the ovaries are relatively inactive in fetal life and childhood, they sustain little damage from lipid accumulation during childhood. In the case of lipoid CAH due to StAR deficiency, when rising gonadotropin levels initiate puberty, despite the inefficiency of sex steroid synthesis, the ovaries will usually make enough estradiol to produce breast development, and in some cases even menarche, with menses continuing for some years. Ovarian and adrenal androgen production is minimal and produces little pubic or other body hair.

However insufficient estradiol and progesterone are produced to induce maturation of an egg and ovulation. Although prepubertal ovaries are inactive enough that no lipid accumulates to cause damage, once they have begun to produce estrogen, lipid damage begins to accrue and the ability to produce estrogen, as well as ovulate, is slowly degraded. Cysts also form in the ovaries. Women with lipoid CAH have been infertile presumably due to anovulation.

==== Male patients ====
The genitalia of XY fetuses with lipoid CAH are severely undervirilized due to impairment of steroid hormone synthesis. The fetal testes make AMH, which prevents a uterus and inner vagina from forming, but since the Leydig cells fail to make testosterone during development even in response to hCG, the testes are usually remain in the abdomen or lodge in the inguinal canals (undescended testes) and are nonfunctional. Consequently, XY patients do not undergo puberty and remain infertile.

In addition to the testes remaining inside, formation of the penis, also dependent on testosterone, is compromised. Hence, the external genitalia in most of infants resemble that of normal females (though the vagina is a short, blind pouch), or is slightly ambiguous (more female than male). Nearly all reported XY cases have been assumed to be girls and raised as such.

=== Late onset forms of the disease ===
Milder, late onset cases of lipoid CAH have been described that arise from less severe mutations that compromise but do not eliminate the ability of StAR to instigate steroid production. In these cases, mineralocorticoid deficiency emerges up to several years after birth. Sex steroid production may be sufficient to allow for normal sexual development as well and even fertility.

These nonclassic forms of the disorder are sometimes diagnosed as familial glucocorticoid deficiency type 3.

== Genetics ==
This inherited disease is autosomal recessive. Understanding of the molecular basis for it has been advanced in the last decade by better understanding of adrenal steroidogenesis as well as genetic studies of affected patients. It used to be assumed that lipoid CAH resulted from a defect of the enzyme that converted cholesterol to pregnenolone. The conversion reactions are mediated by a single enzyme, formerly referred to as 20,22-desmolase, but now identified as cytochrome P450scc (cholesterol side chain cleavage enzyme). However, few cases of lipoid CAH due to a mutation and defect of P450scc have been identified. Although the disorder is considered autosomal recessive, a single mutation in P450scc can be sufficient to cause the condition. All other cases of lipoid adrenal hyperplasia that have been studied have been found to be due to mutations of the gene for the primary protein that transports cholesterol into the mitochondria, StAR, encoded by a gene on chromosome 8p11.2 in the human.

Congenital adrenal hyperplasias are a family of autosomal recessive diseases resulting from defects in steps of the synthesis of steroid hormones from cholesterol. All forms of CAH involve excessive or defective production of sex steroids and can prevent or impair development of primary or secondary sex characteristics in affected infants, children, and adults. Many also involve excessive or defective production of mineralocorticoids, which can cause hypertension or salt-wasting.

Lipoid CAH is one of the rarer forms of CAH and results from defects in the steps from cholesterol to pregnenolone. This results in the catastrophic loss of most or all steroid hormones in the body. It is caused by mutations in either of two proteins: cytochrome P450scc and steroidogenic acute regulatory protein (StAR).

== Pathophysiology ==
The deficiency results in impaired synthesis of all three categories of adrenal steroids (cortisol, mineralocorticoids, sex steroids) and high levels of adrenocorticotropic hormone (ACTH). A low level of steroid synthesis proceeds even without efficient transport, but is rarely enough to prevent the consequences of deficiency. While severe loss of steroid production results in manifestation of the disease within a few weeks of birth, milder forms (late onset) can present years after birth. Unlike in models of the disease in mice, patients with lipoid CAH do not always have enlarged adrenals due to lipid accumulation. This may in part be due to hormone replacement used to keep them alive preventing hyperstimulation of the gland by the pituitary.

ACTH stimulates growth of the adrenal cells and increases LDL receptors to amplify transport of cholesterol into the cells of the adrenal cortex which make adrenal steroids, where it accumulates since little can enter the mitochondria for conversion to steroid. Normally, adrenal steroids then signal their presence to the brain to moderate ACTH levels (feedback inhibition). However, in the absence of this, ACTH levels are elevated and cholesterol uptake by the cortical cells continues unabated. The adrenals become markedly enlarged (hyperplastic) by the accumulated lipid. Lipid accumulation is thought to damage the cells further ("second hit hypothesis").

Because P450scc and StAR are also essential for sex steroid synthesis in the testis and ovary, the production of testosterone by Leydig cells in the testis and androgens (which leads to estrogen production by granulosa cells) and progesterone by ovarian theca cells and luteal cells, respectively, can also be impaired. Similar to the adrenal gland, cholesterol accumulation damages the Leydig cells of the testes. In the ovary, the damage begins after puberty, the time when the ovary starts making steroid with follicle development. The placenta also makes steroid to help maintain pregnancy. However, since StAR is not required for placental steroid production, pregnancy goes to term. When the mutation in P450scc that causes lipoid CAH is either heterozygous or its presence on both alleles does not completely destroy all function, affected babies can survive to birth as well. Also of note, enlargement of the adrenal gland is not always found in the patient, especially in cases where a mutation in the gene for P450scc is the cause.

The pathophysiology of lipoid CAH differs from other forms of CAH in certain aspects. First, the affected gene in most cases is that for a transport protein (StAR) rather than a steroidogenic enzyme. Second, because the defect compromises all steroid synthesis. Thus, there are no problems due to excessive mineralocorticoids or androgens. Third, lipid accumulation damages the testes and ovaries so that even with appropriate adrenal hormone replacement (and in the absence of other intervention), gonadal function and fertility cannot be preserved.

== Diagnosis ==
In terms of diagnosis of this condition, gene sequencing can be done.

== Management ==
Management of salt-wasting crises and mineralocorticoid treatment are as for other forms of salt-wasting congenital adrenal hyperplasias: saline and fludrocortisone. Glucocorticoids can be provided at minimal replacement doses because there is no need for suppression of excessive adrenal androgens or mineralocorticoids. As with other forms of adrenal insufficiency, extra glucocorticoid is needed for stress coverage.

=== Female patients ===
XX females with lipoid CAH may need estrogen replacement at or after puberty. Active intervention has been used to preserve the possibility of fertility and conception in lipoid CAH females. In a case report in 2009, a woman with late onset lipoid CAH due to StAR deficiency underwent hormone replacement therapy in combination with an assisted fertility technique, intracytoplasmic sperm injection. This led to ovulation and with implantation of the in vitro fertilized egg, a successful birth.

=== Male patients ===
Most XY children are so undervirilized that they are raised as girls. The testes are uniformly nonfunctional and undescended; they are removed when the diagnosis is made due to the risk of cancer development in these tissues.

== Epidemiology ==
Lipoid CAH is quite rare in European and North American populations. Most cases occur in Japan and Korea (where the incidence is 1 in 300,000 births) and Palestinian Arabs. Despite autosomal inheritance, there has been an unexplained preponderance of genetic females in reported cases.

== See also ==
- Inborn errors of steroid metabolism
- Congenital adrenal hyperplasia
- Adrenal insufficiency
- Disorders of sexual development
- Intersexuality, pseudohermaphroditism, and ambiguous genitalia
- Steroidogenic acute regulatory protein
- Cholesterol side-chain cleavage enzyme
- Cholesterol, sex hormone, and corticosteroid
