= Cyanoketone =

Chemical compound

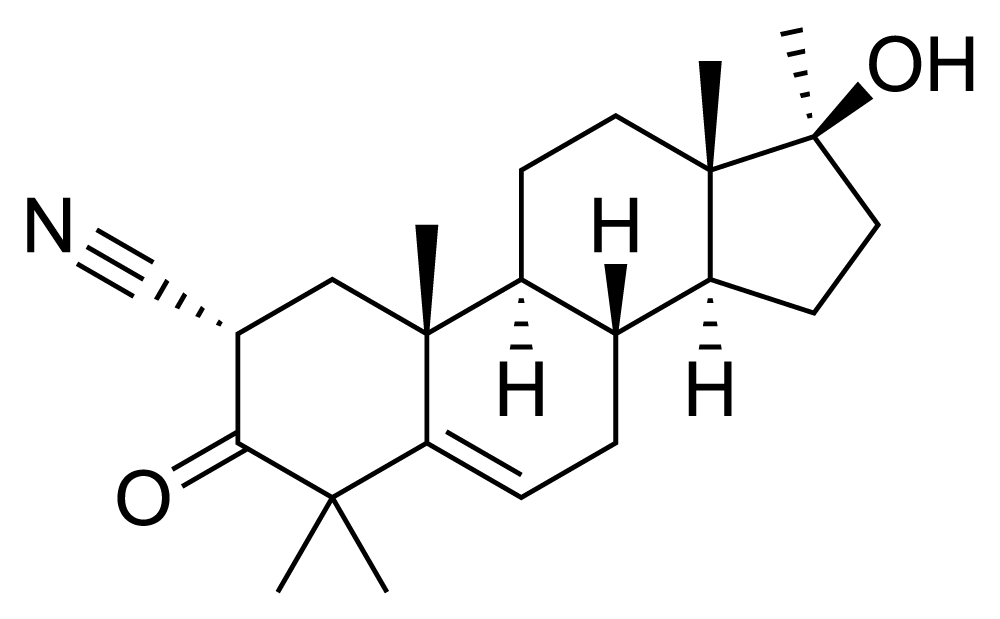

Clinical data
- Other names: Cyanotrimethylandrostenolone; CTM; 2α-Cyano-4,4',17α-trimethylandrost-5-en-17β-ol-3-one

Identifiers
- IUPAC name: (2S,8R,9S,10R,13S,14S,17S)-17-hydroxy-4,4,10,13,17-pentamethyl-3-oxo-1,2,7,8,9,11,12,14,15,16-decahydrocyclopenta[a]phenanthrene-2-carbonitrile
- CAS Number: 4248-66-2
- PubChem CID: 20243
- ChemSpider: 19069
- UNII: EPG65S4XCZ
- CompTox Dashboard (EPA): DTXSID50962528

Chemical and physical data
- Formula: C_{23}H_{33}NO_{2}
- Molar mass: 355.522 g·mol^{−1}
- 3D model (JSmol): Interactive image
- SMILES: N#C[C@H]4C(=O)C(C\3=C\C[C@@H]2[C@H](CC[C@]1([C@H]2CC[C@@]1(O)C)C)[C@@]/3(C)C4)(C)C
- InChI: InChI=1S/C23H33NO2/c1-20(2)18-7-6-15-16(21(18,3)12-14(13-24)19(20)25)8-10-22(4)17(15)9-11-23(22,5)26/h7,14-17,26H,6,8-12H2,1-5H3/t14-,15+,16-,17-,21+,22-,23-/m0/s1; Key:GTBRTGPZZALPNS-MXHVRSFHSA-N

Cyanoketone, also known as 2α-cyano-4,4',17α-trimethylandrost-5-en-17β-ol-3-one (CTM), is a synthetic androstane steroid and a steroidogenesis inhibitor which is used in scientific research. On account of its structural similarity to pregnenolone, cyanoketone binds to and acts as a potent, selective, and irreversible inhibitor of 3β-hydroxysteroid dehydrogenase (3β-HSD), an enzyme that is responsible for the conversion of pregnenolone into progesterone, 17α-hydroxypregnenolone into 17α-hydroxyprogesterone, DHEA into androstenedione, and androstenediol into testosterone. As such, cyanoketone inhibits the production of both gonadal and adrenal steroids, including progesterone, androgens, estrogens, and corticosteroids. The drug is too toxic for therapeutic use in humans, and so has been used instead exclusively as a research tool.

== See also ==
- Azastene
- Epostane
