= HSD3B7 =

Enzyme found in humans

Identifiers
- Aliases: HSD3B7, CBAS1, PFIC4, SDR11E3, hydroxy-delta-5-steroid dehydrogenase, 3 beta- and steroid delta-isomerase 7
- External IDs: OMIM: 607764; MGI: 2141879; GeneCards: HSD3B7
Enzyme activity
| EC # | BRENDA | ExPASy | KEGG | MetaCyc |
|---|---|---|---|---|
| 1.1.1.181 | ↗ | ↗ | ↗ | ↗ |

Gene location (Human)
| Chr. | Chromosome 16 (human) |
| Band | 16p11.2 | Start | 30,985,207 bp |
| Band | 16p11.2 | End | 30,989,147 bp |

Gene location (Mouse)
| Chr. | Chromosome 7 (mouse) |
| Band | 7|7 F3 | Start | 127,399,776 bp |
| Band | 7|7 F3 | End | 127,402,974 bp |
RNA expression pattern
| Bgee | Human / Mouse (ortholog); Top expressed in: right lobe of liver; left adrenal gland; left adrenal cortex; right adrenal gland; apex of heart; right adrenal cortex; mucosa of transverse colon; body of pancreas; subcutaneous adipose tissue; human kidney / Top expressed in: hepatobiliary system; liver; white adipose tissue; mandibular molars; zygote; secondary oocyte; zone of skin; pancreas; urinary bladder; esophagus; More reference expression data |
| BioGPS | n/a |
Gene ontology
| Molecular function | oxidoreductase activity, acting on the CH-OH group of donors, NAD or NADP as acceptor; oxidoreductase activity; protein binding; 3-beta-hydroxy-delta5-steroid dehydrogenase activity; cholest-5-ene-3-beta,7-alpha-diol 3-beta-dehydrogenase activity |
| Cellular component | integral component of membrane; endoplasmic reticulum membrane; endoplasmic reticulum; membrane; cellular component; lipid droplet |
| Biological process | bile acid biosynthetic process; steroid biosynthetic process; B cell chemotaxis; cholesterol catabolic process |
Sources:Amigo / QuickGO
Orthologs
| Databases | NCBI: entry; OMA: entry |
| Species | Human | Mouse |
| Entrez | 80270 | 101502 |
| Ensembl | ENSG00000099377 | ENSMUSG00000042289 |
| UniProt | Q9H2F3 | Q9EQC1 |
| RefSeq (mRNA) | NM_001142777; NM_001142778; NM_025193 | NM_001040684; NM_133943 |
| RefSeq (protein) | NP_001136249; NP_001136250; NP_079469 | NP_001035774; NP_598704 |
| Location (UCSC) | Chr 16: 30.99 – 30.99 Mb | Chr 7: 127.4 – 127.4 Mb |
| PubMed search |
- Wikidata
| View/Edit Human | View/Edit Mouse |

cholest-5-ene-3β,7α-diol 3β-dehydrogenase

Identifiers
- EC no.: 1.1.1.181
- CAS no.: 56626-16-5

Databases
- BRENDA: enzyme data
- ExPASy: NiceZyme view
- KEGG: enzyme entry
- MetaCyc: metabolic pathway
- Rhea: reactions
- PDB structures: RCSB PDB PDBe PDBsum
- Gene Ontology: AmiGO / QuickGO
Search
- PMC: articles
- PubMed: articles
- NCBI: proteins

3 beta-hydroxysteroid dehydrogenase type 7 (or 3β-HSD7) is an enzyme that in humans is encoded by the HSD3B7 gene. Also called cholest-5-ene-3β,7α-diol 3β-dehydrogenase (EC 1.1.1.181), this enzyme catalyzes several chemical reactions of steroids, and is particularly important for bile acid synthesis which is needed for proper lipid digestion.

The primary reaction is to convert 7α-hydroxycholesterol to 7α-hydroxycholest-4-en-3-one:

7α-hydroxycholesterol
+ NAD^{+}
H^{+}
H^{+}
7α-hydroxycholest-4-en-3-one
+ NADH

The two substrates are 7α-hydroxycholesterol and oxidised nicotinamide adenine dinucleotide (NAD^{+}). The products are 7α-hydroxycholest-4-en-3-one, reduced NADH, and a proton.

The systematic name of this enzyme class is cholest-5-ene-3β,7α-diol:NAD^{+} 3-oxidoreductase. This enzyme is also called 3β-hydroxy-Δ5-C27-steroid oxidoreductase.

== Function ==
This enzyme belongs to the family of oxidoreductases, specifically those acting on the CH-OH group of donor with NAD^{+} or NADP^{+} as acceptor. This enzyme is involved in the initial stages of the synthesis of bile acids from cholesterol and a member of the short-chain dehydrogenase/reductase superfamily. This enzyme is a membrane-associated endoplasmic reticulum protein which is active against 7-alpha hydroxylated sterol substrates.

== Clinical significance ==
Mutations in the HSD3B7 gene are associated with a congenital bile acid synthesis defect which leads to neonatal cholestasis, a form of progressive liver disease.

== See also ==
- 3-beta-HSD — a related class of enzymes that includes HSD3B7's two closest paralogs
- HSD3B1
- HSD3B2
