= 3β-Hydroxysteroid dehydrogenase =

Class of enzymes

3β-hydroxysteroid dehydrogenase/Δ-5-4 isomerase

Identifiers
- EC no.: 1.1.1.145
- CAS no.: 9044-85-3

Databases
- BRENDA: enzyme data
- ExPASy: NiceZyme view
- KEGG: enzyme entry
- MetaCyc: metabolic pathway
- Rhea: reactions
- PDB structures: RCSB PDB PDBe PDBsum
- Gene Ontology: AmiGO / QuickGO
Search
- PMC: articles
- PubMed: articles
- NCBI: proteins

3β-Hydroxysteroid dehydrogenase

Identifiers
- Symbol: HSD3B
- Pfam: PF01073
- InterPro: IPR002225
- Membranome: 245
Available protein structures:
- PDB: IPR002225 PF01073 (ECOD; PDBsum)
- AlphaFold: IPR002225; PF01073

hydroxy-Δ-5-steroid dehydrogenase, 3β- and steroid Δ-isomerase 1

Identifiers
- Symbol: HSD3B1
- Alt. symbols: HSDB3, HSD3B
- NCBI gene: 3283
- HGNC: 5217
- OMIM: 109715
- RefSeq: NM_000862
- UniProt: P14060

Other data
- EC number: 1.1.1.145
- Locus: Chr. 1 p13-p11
Search for
- Structures: Swiss-model
- Domains: InterPro

hydroxy-Δ-5-steroid dehydrogenase, 3β- and steroid Δ-isomerase 2

Identifiers
- Symbol: HSD3B2
- NCBI gene: 3284
- HGNC: 5218
- OMIM: 613890
- RefSeq: NM_000198
- UniProt: P26439

Other data
- EC number: 1.1.1.145
- Locus: Chr. 1 p13.1
Search for
- Structures: Swiss-model
- Domains: InterPro

3β-Hydroxysteroid dehydrogenase/Δ^{5-4} isomerase (3β-HSD) (EC 1.1.1.145) is an enzyme that catalyzes the biosynthesis of the steroid progesterone from pregnenolone, 17α-hydroxyprogesterone from 17α-hydroxypregnenolone, and androstenedione from dehydroepiandrosterone (DHEA) in the adrenal gland. It is the only enzyme in the adrenal pathway of corticosteroid synthesis that is not a member of the cytochrome P450 family. It is also present in other steroid-producing tissues, including the ovary, testis and placenta. In humans, there are two 3β-HSD isozymes encoded by the HSD3B1 and HSD3B2 genes.

3β-HSD is also known as delta Δ^{5-4}-isomerase, which catalyzes the oxidative conversion of Δ^{5}-3β-hydroxysteroids to the Δ^{4}-3-keto configuration and is, therefore, essential for the biosynthesis of all classes of hormonal steroids, namely progesterone, glucocorticoids, mineralocorticoids, androgens, and estrogens.

The 3β-HSD complex is responsible for the conversion of:

- Pregnenolone to progesterone
- 17α-Hydroxypregnenolone to 17α-hydroxyprogesterone
- DHEA to androstenedione
- Androstenediol to testosterone
- Androstadienol to androstadienone

== Reaction ==
3β-HSD belongs to the family of oxidoreductases, to be specific, those acting on the CH-OH group with NAD^{+} or NADP^{+} as acceptor. This enzyme participates in C21-steroid hormone metabolism and androgen and estrogen metabolism.

3β-HSD catalysis|catalyzes the chemical reaction:

a 3β-hydroxy-Δ^{5}-steroid + NAD^{+} ⇌ a 3-oxo-Δ^{5}-steroid + NADH + H^{+}

The two substrates of this enzyme are 3β-hydroxy-Δ^{5}-steroid and NAD^{+}. Its products are 3-oxo-Δ^{5}-steroid, NADH, and H^{+}.

An example with oxidation and simultaneous double bond isomerism is the conversion of pregnenolone to progesterone:

pregnenolone
+ NAD^{+}
H^{+}
H^{+}
progesterone
+ NADH

== Isozymes ==
Humans express two 3β-HSD isozymes, HSD3B1 (type I) and HSD3B2 (type II). The type I isoenzyme is expressed in placenta and peripheral tissues, whereas the type II 3β-HSD isoenzyme is expressed in the adrenal gland, ovary, and testis.

== Nomenclature ==
The systematic name of this enzyme class is 3β-hydroxy-Δ^{5}-steroid:NAD^{+} 3-oxidoreductase. Other names in common use include:

- progesterone reductase
- Δ^{5}-3β-hydroxysteroid dehydrogenase
- 3β-hydroxy-5-ene steroid dehydrogenase
- 3β-hydroxy steroid dehydrogenase/isomerase
- 3β-hydroxy-Δ^{5}-C27-steroid dehydrogenase/isomerase
- 3β-hydroxy-Δ^{5}-C27-steroid oxidoreductase
- 3β-hydroxy-5-ene-steroid oxidoreductase
- steroid-Δ^{5}-3β-ol dehydrogenase
- 3β-HSDH
- 5-ene-3β-hydroxysteroid dehydrogenase
- 3β-hydroxy-5-ene-steroid dehydrogenase

== Inhibitors ==
3β-HSD is potently inhibited by azastene, cyanoketone, epostane, and trilostane. Medroxyprogesterone acetate and medrogestone are weak inhibitors of 3β-HSD which may substantially inhibit it at high dosages.

== Biosynthetic pathway ==
Human steroidogenesis, showing reactions of 3β-HSD near-left in green box.

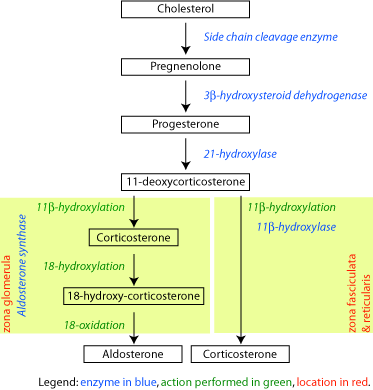
Corticosteroid biosynthetic pathway in the rat, showing reaction catalyzed by 3β-HSD (second arrow from the top).

== Clinical significance ==
A deficiency in the type II form through mutations in HSD3B2 is responsible for a rare form of congenital adrenal hyperplasia. No human condition has yet been linked to a deficiency in the type I enzyme. Its importance in placental progesterone production expression suggests that such a mutation would be embryonically lethal.

The fetal adrenal cortex lacks expression of the enzyme early on, thus mineralocorticoids (e.g. aldosterone) and glucocorticoids (e.g. cortisol) cannot be synthesized. This is significant because cortisol induces type II pneumocytes of the lungs to synthesize and secrete pulmonary surfactant; without pulmonary surfactant to reduce the alveolar surface tension, premature neonates may die of neonatal respiratory distress syndrome. If delivery is unavoidable (e.g. because of placental abruption, or pre-eclampsia/HELLP syndrome), then glucocorticoids (e.g. cortisol) can be administered.

== See also ==
- Steroidogenic enzyme
- 3α-Hydroxysteroid dehydrogenase
- HSD3B7
