= Compound S =

Compound S may refer to:

- Cortodoxone
- Zidovudine, by trade name
