= Azastene =

Chemical compound

Clinical data
- Other names: WIN-17625; 4,4,17α-Trimethylandrosta-2,5-dieno(2,3-d)isoxazol-17β-ol

Identifiers
- IUPAC name: (1S,3aS,3bR,10aR,10bS,12aS)-1,6,6,10a,12a-Pentamethyl-2,3,3a,3b,4,6,10,10a,10b,11,12,12a-dodecahydro-1H-cyclopenta[7,8]phenanthro[3,2-d][1,2]oxazol-1-ol
- CAS Number: 13074-00-5
- PubChem CID: 11725766
- ChemSpider: 9900482
- UNII: 1XA84ITL1H
- ChEMBL: ChEMBL2103987
- CompTox Dashboard (EPA): DTXSID801180403

Chemical and physical data
- Formula: C_{23}H_{33}NO_{2}
- Molar mass: 355.522 g·mol^{−1}
- 3D model (JSmol): Interactive image
- SMILES: C[C@]12CC[C@H]3[C@H]([C@@H]1CC[C@]2(C)O)CC=C4[C@@]3(CC5=C(C4(C)C)ON=C5)C
- InChI: InChI=1S/C23H33NO2/c1-20(2)18-7-6-15-16(21(18,3)12-14-13-24-26-19(14)20)8-10-22(4)17(15)9-11-23(22,5)25/h7,13,15-17,25H,6,8-12H2,1-5H3/t15-,16+,17+,21-,22+,23+/m1/s1; Key:AXLOCHLTNQDFFS-BESJYZOMSA-N

Azastene (INN, USAN) (developmental code name WIN-17625) is a steroidogenesis inhibitor described as a contraceptive, luteolytic, and abortifacient which was never marketed. It acts as a competitive inhibitor of 3β-hydroxysteroid dehydrogenase (IC_{50} = 1 μM), and thereby inhibiting the formation of progesterone, corticosteroids, androgens, and estrogens. Due to inhibition of corticosteroid synthesis, azastene is immunosuppressive.

== Synthesis ==
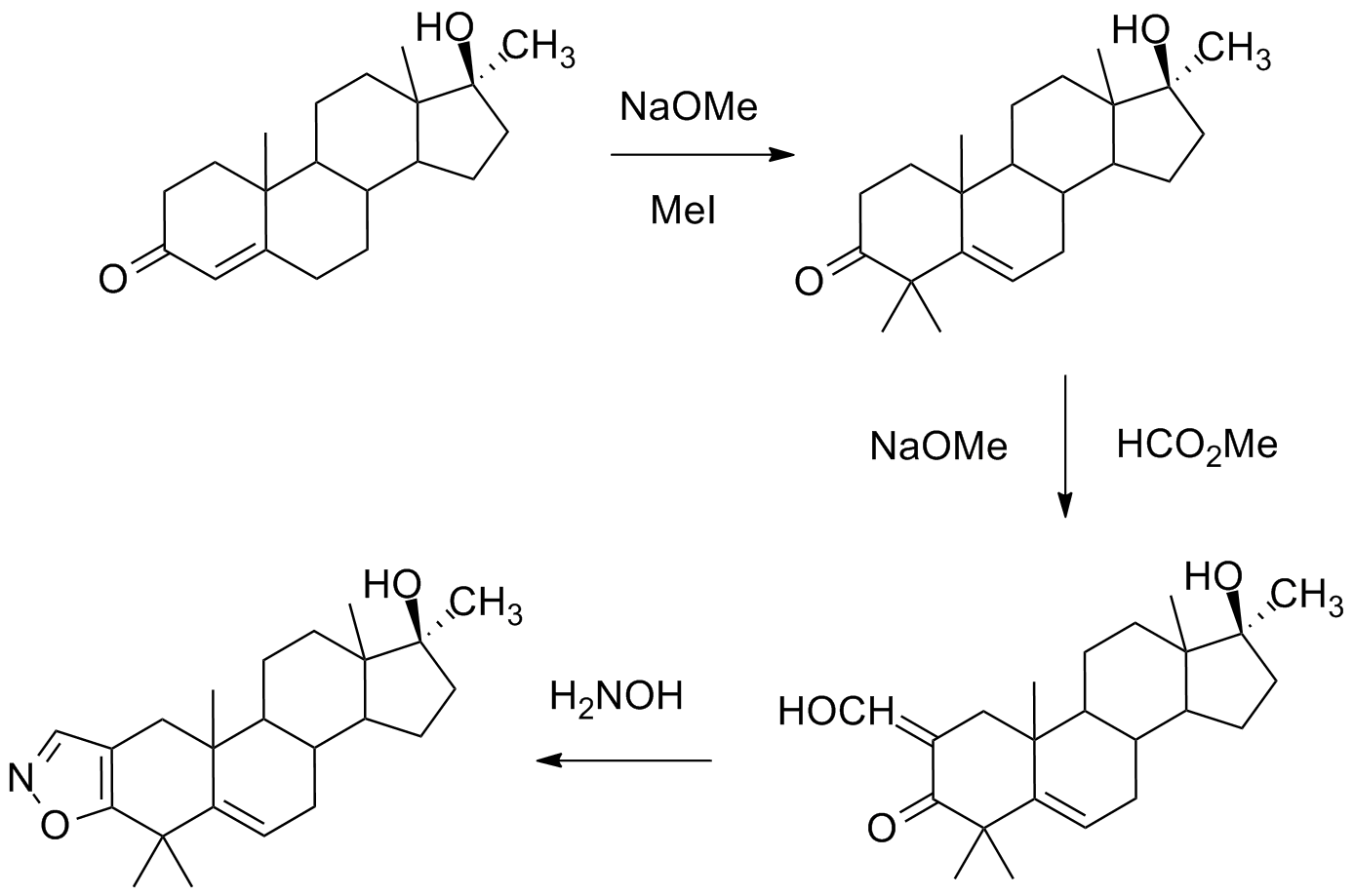
Azastene synthesis:

One synthesis of this compound involves initial alkylation of methyl testosterone by means of strong base and methyl iodide to afford the 4,4-dimethyl derivative. Formylation with alkoxide and methyl formate leads to the 2-hydroxymethyl derivative. Reaction of this last with hydroxylamine leads to formation of an isoxazole ring. There is then obtained azastene.

== See also ==
- Cyanoketone
- Androisoxazole
