= Ferriman–Gallwey score =

Method of evaluating hirsutism in women

The Ferriman–Gallwey score is a method of evaluating and quantifying hirsutism in women. The method was originally published in 1961 by D. Ferriman and J.D. Gallwey in the Journal of Clinical Endocrinology.

== Scoring ==
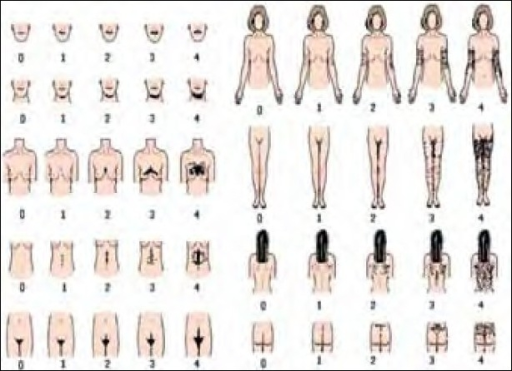
Modified Ferriman-Gallwey score

Hair growth is rated from 0 (no growth of terminal hair) to 4 (extensive hair growth) in multiple areas of the body. The original method used 11 body areas to assess hair growth, but this was decreased to 9 body areas in the modified method (1981).

Because most women aged 20 to 40 were observed with "a significant growth of hair" on the forearm and leg, Ferriman and Gallwey speculated there could be two factors affecting body hair growth: one being protective but gender-indifferent (on the forearm and leg) and the other being sexually determined (elsewhere). Therefore, in the modified method, the forearm and leg were removed from the score. A patient's score may therefore range from a minimum score of 0 to a maximum score of 36. With each ethnic group, the amount of hair expected for that ethnicity should be considered. For example, in Caucasian women, a score of 8 or higher is regarded as indicative of androgen excess.

Ferriman-Gallwey scoring locations, as modified in 2001

The method was further modified in 2001 to include a total of 19 locations, which also restored the forearms and legs that were deleted in 1981. Each area has its own specified definition of the four-point scale; for example, the arm, forearm, thigh, and leg are scored as (1) = sparse growth affecting no more than a quarter of the limb surface; (2) = more than [sparse growth]; cover still incomplete; (3) complete cover, light; (4) complete cover, heavy. The current list of locations includes:

1. Upper lip (Note: As listed by Ferriman & Gallwey (1961)) (Note: As listed by Hatch, Rosenfeld, et.al. (1981)) (Note: As listed by AACE (2001))
2. Chin
3. Sideburns
4. Neck
5. Chest
6. Upper back
7. Lower back
8. Buttocks
9. Upper abdomen
10. Lower abdomen
11. Inguinal area
12. Perianal area
13. (Upper) Arms
14. Forearms
15. Thighs
16. Legs
17. Foot
18. Toes
19. Fingers
