= Congenital adrenal hyperplasia =

Genetic disorders of the adrenal gland

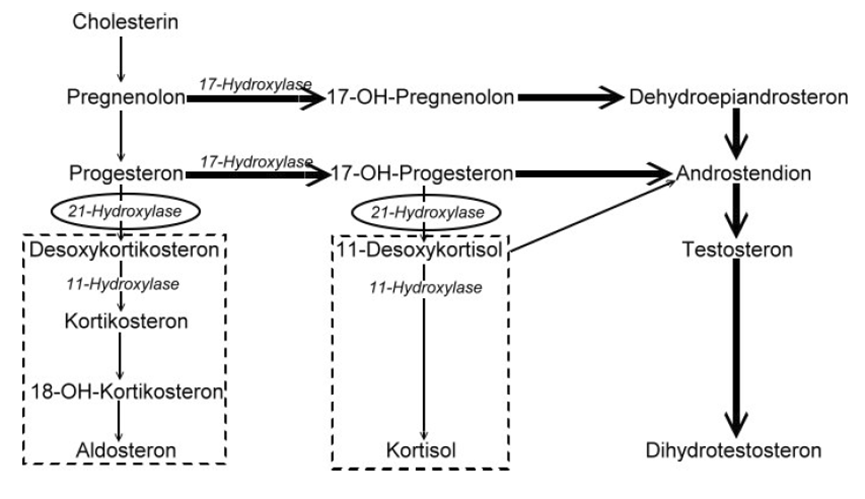
- Congenital adrenal hyperplasia enzymes
- Specialty: Endocrinology
- Symptoms: Excessive urination of sodium, virilism, early, delayed, or absent puberty, hyperandrogenism
- Usual onset: Before birth
- Duration: Lifetime
- Causes: Variants in genes responsible for the production of enzymes required for the synthesis of cortisol in the adrenal cortex
- Frequency: 0.005%

Congenital adrenal hyperplasia (CAH) is a group of autosomal recessive disorders characterized by impaired cortisol synthesis. It results from the deficiency of one of the five enzymes required for the synthesis of cortisol in the adrenal cortex. Most of these disorders involve excessive or deficient production of hormones such as glucocorticoids, mineralocorticoids, or sex steroids, and can alter development of primary or secondary sex characteristics in some affected infants, children, or adults. It is one of the most common autosomal recessive disorders in humans.

== Types ==
CAH can occur in various forms. The clinical presentation of each form is different and depends to a large extent on the underlying enzyme defect, its precursor retention, and deficient products. Classical forms appear in infancy and nonclassical forms appear in late childhood. The presentation in patients with classical CAH can be further subdivided into two forms: salt-wasting and simple-virilizing depending on whether mineralocorticoid deficiency is present or absent, respectively. This subtyping is often not clinically meaningful, though, because all patients lose salt to some degree, and clinical presentations may overlap.

=== Classical ===
==== Salt-wasting ====
In 75% of cases of severe enzyme deficiency, insufficient aldosterone production can lead to salt wasting, failure to thrive, and potentially fatal hypovolemia and shock. A missed diagnosis of salt-loss CAH is related to the increased risk of early neonatal morbidity and death.

==== Simple-virilizing ====
The main feature of CAH in newborn females is the abnormal development of the external genitalia, which has varying degrees of virilization. According to clinical practice guidelines, for newborns found to have bilateral inaccessible gonads, CAH evaluation should be considered. If virilizing CAH cannot be identified and treated, both boys and girls may undergo rapid postnatal growth and virilization.

=== Nonclassical ===
In addition to the salt-wasting and simple-virilizing forms of CAH diagnosed in infancy, a mild or "nonclassical" form exists, which is characterized by varying degrees of postnatal androgen excess, but is sometimes asymptomatic. The nonclassical form may be noticed in late childhood and may lead to signs of hyperandrogenism such as accelerated growth, acne, hirsutism, premature pubarche, menstrual irregularities, and secondary polyendocrine metabolic ovarian syndrome (PMOS). In adult males, early balding and infertility may suggest the diagnosis. The nonclassical form is characterized by mild subclinical impairment of cortisol synthesis and serum cortisol concentration is usually normal.

== Signs and symptoms ==
The symptoms of CAH vary depending upon the form of CAH and the sex of the patient. Symptoms can include:

Due to inadequate mineralocorticoids:

- Vomiting due to salt-wasting, leading to dehydration and death

Due to excess androgens:

- In extreme virilization, clitoromegaly (elongated clitoris) with a phallic-like structure is seen and/or masculinization of the labia fully fusion into scrotum and penile urethra at the tip of the glans, the external genitals appearing male.
- Ambiguous genitalia, in some infants, occurs such that initially identifying external genitalia as "male" or "female" is difficult.
- Early pubic hair and rapid growth occurs in childhood.
- Precocious puberty or failure of puberty to occur (sexual infantilism: absent or delayed puberty)
- Excessive facial hair, virilization, and/or menstrual irregularity in adolescence
- Infertility due to anovulation
- Shallow vagina

Due to insufficient androgens and estrogens:

- Undervirilization in XY males can result in an apparent vulva.
- Ambiguous genitalia in XY males with 3β-hydroxysteroid dehydrogenase deficiency (3β-HSD2D).
- In females, hypogonadism can cause sexual infantilism or abnormal pubertal development, infertility, and other reproductive system abnormalities.

== Genetics ==
CAH results from mutations of genes for enzymes mediating the biochemical steps of production of mineralocorticoids, glucocorticoids, or sex steroids from cholesterol by the adrenal glands (steroidogenesis).

Each form of CAH is associated with a specific defective gene. The most common type (95% of cases) involves the gene for 21-hydroxylase, which is found on 6p21.3 as part of the HLA complex; 21-hydroxylase deficiency results from a unique mutation with two highly homologous near-copies in series consisting of an active gene (CYP21A2) and an inactive pseudogene (CYP21A1P). Mutant alleles result from recombination between the active and pseudogenes (gene conversion). About 5% of cases of CAH are due to defects in the gene encoding 11β-hydroxylase and consequent 11β-hydroxylase deficiency. Other, more rare forms of CAH are caused by mutations in genes, including HSD3B2 (3β-hydroxysteroid dehydrogenase 2), CYP17A1 (17α-hydroxylase/17,20-lyase), CYP11A1 (P450scc; cholesterol side-chain cleavage enzyme), STAR (steroidogenic acute regulatory protein; StAR), CYB5A (cytochrome b_{5}), and CYPOR (cytochrome P450 oxidoreductase; POR).

=== Expressivity ===
Further variability is introduced by the degree of enzyme inefficiency produced by the specific alleles each patient has. Some alleles result in more severe degrees of enzyme inefficiency. In general, severe degrees of inefficiency produce changes in the fetus and problems in prenatal or perinatal life. Milder degrees of inefficiency are usually associated with excessive or deficient sex hormone effects in childhood or adolescence, while the mildest forms of CAH interfere with ovulation and fertility in adults.

== Diagnosis ==
=== Clinical evaluation ===
Female infants with classical CAH have ambiguous genitalia due to exposure to high concentrations of androgens in utero. CAH due to 21-hydroxylase deficiency is the most common cause of ambiguous genitalia in genotypically normal female infants (46XX). Less severely affected females may present with early pubarche. Young women may present with symptoms of polyendocrine metabolic ovarian syndrome (PMOS) (oligomenorrhea, polycystic ovaries, hirsutism).

Males with classical CAH generally have no signs of CAH at birth. Some may present with hyperpigmentation, due to co-secretion with melanocyte-stimulating hormone, and possible penile enlargement. Age of diagnosis of males with CAH varies and depends on the severity of aldosterone deficiency. Boys with salt-wasting disease present early with symptoms of hyponatremia and hypovolemia. Boys with non-salt-wasting disease present later with signs of virilization.

In rarer forms of CAH, males are undermasculinized and females generally have no signs or symptoms at birth.

CAH can be diagnosed through evaluation of the ACTH stimulation test.

=== Laboratory studies ===
In classical 21-hydroxylase deficiency, laboratory studies will show:

- Hypoglycemia (due to hypocortisolism) - One of cortisol's many functions is to increase blood glucose levels. This occurs via a combination of several mechanisms, including (a) the stimulation of gluconeogesis (i.e. the creation of new glucose) in the liver, (b) the promotion of glycogenolysis (i.e. the breakdown of glycogen into glucose), and (c) the prevention of glucose leaving the bloodstream via the downregulation of GLUT-4 receptors (which normally promote movement of glucose from the bloodstream into adipose and muscle tissues). Therefore, when cortisol is deficient, these processes (effectively) occur in the reverse direction. Although there are compensatory mechanisms that mitigate the impact of hypocortisolism, they are limited in their extent and the net effect is still hypoglycemia.
- Hyponatremia (due to hypoaldosteronism) - Aldosterone is the end product of the renin-angiotensin-aldosterone system that regulates blood pressure via blood pressure surveillance in the Kidney Juxtaglomerular apparatus. Aldosterone normally functions to increase sodium retention (which brings water as well) in exchange for potassium. Thus, lack of aldosterone causes hyperkalemia and hyponatremia. In fact, this is a distinguishing point from 11-hydroxylase deficiency, in which one of the increased products is 11-deoxycorticosterone that has weak mineralocorticoid activity. In 11-hydroxylase deficiency, 11-deoxycorticosterone is produced in such excess that it acts to retain sodium at the expense of potassium. For this reason, patients with 11-hydroxylase deficiency do not show salt wasting (although sometimes they do in infancy), and instead have hypertension/water retention and sometimes hypokalemia.
- Hyperkalemia (due to hypoaldosteronism)
- Elevated 17α-hydroxyprogesterone

Classical 21-hydroxylase deficiency typically causes 17α-hydroxyprogesterone blood levels >242 nmol/L. (For comparison, a full-term infant at three days of age should have <3 nmol/L. Many neonatal screening programs have specific reference ranges by weight and gestational age because high levels may be seen in premature infants without CAH.) Salt-wasting patients tend to have higher 17α-hydroxyprogesterone levels than non-salt-wasting patients. In mild cases, 17α-hydroxyprogesterone may not be elevated in a particular random blood sample, but it will rise during a corticotropin stimulation test.

=== Classification ===
Cortisol is an adrenal steroid hormone required for normal endocrine function. Production begins in the second month of fetal life. Poor cortisol production is a hallmark of most forms of CAH. Inefficient cortisol production results in rising levels of ACTH, because cortisol feeds back to inhibit ACTH production, so loss of cortisol results in increased ACTH. This increased ACTH stimulation induces overgrowth (hyperplasia) and overactivity of the steroid-producing cells of the adrenal cortex. The defects causing adrenal hyperplasia are congenital (i.e. present at birth).

Steroidogenesis: The enzymes affected in CAH are represented by one red and four green bars on the top half of the diagram (for example, "21α-hydroxylase" is visible near the top center. "17α-hydroxylase" and "17,20 lyase" are carried out by a single enzyme). Depending upon which enzyme is unavailable, production of androgens (lower left) or mineralocorticoids (upper right) is reduced. This, in turn, can lead to increased production of other molecules, due to a buildup of precursors.

Cortisol deficiency in CAH is usually partial, and not the most serious problem for an affected person. Synthesis of cortisol shares steps with synthesis of mineralocorticoids such as aldosterone, androgens such as testosterone, and estrogens such as estradiol. The resulting excessive or deficient production of these three classes of hormones produce the most important problems for people with CAH. Specific enzyme inefficiencies are associated with characteristic patterns of over- or underproduction of mineralocorticoids or sex steroids.

Since the 1960s, most endocrinologists have referred to the forms of CAH by the traditional names in the left column, which generally correspond to the deficient enzyme activity. As exact structures and genes for the enzymes were identified in the 1980s, most of the enzymes were found to be cytochrome P450 oxidases and were renamed to reflect this. In some cases, more than one enzyme was found to participate in a reaction, and in other cases, a single enzyme mediated in more than one reaction. Variation in different tissues and mammalian species also was found.

In all its forms, congenital adrenal hyperplasia due to 21-hydroxylase deficiency accounts for about 95% of diagnosed cases of CAH. Unless another specific enzyme is mentioned, "CAH" in nearly all contexts refers to 21-hydroxylase deficiency. (The terms "salt-wasting CAH", and "simple virilizing CAH" usually refer to subtypes of this condition.) CAH due to deficiencies of enzymes other than 21-hydroxylase present many of the same management challenges, as 21-hydroxylase deficiency, but some involve mineralocorticoid excess or sex steroid deficiency.

Common medical term	%	OMIM	Enzyme(s)	Locus	Substrate(s)	Product(s)	Mineralocorticoids	Androgens
21-Hydroxylase CAH	95%	201910	P450c21	6p21.3	17-OH-Progesterone→ Progesterone→	11-Deoxycortisol; DOC	↓	↑
11β-Hydroxylase CAH	5%	202010	P450c11β	8q21-22	11-Deoxycortisol→ DOC→	Cortisol; Corticosterone	↑	↑
3β-HSD CAH	Very rare	201810	3βHSD2	1p13	Pregnenolone→ 17-OH-Pregnenolone→ DHEA→	Progesterone; 17-OH-Progesterone; Androstenedione	↓	↓
17α-Hydroxylase CAH	Very rare	202110	CYP17A1	10q24.3	Pregnenolone→ Progesterone→ 17-OH-Pregnenolone→	17-OH-Pregnenolone; 17-OH-Progesterone; DHEA	↑	↓
Lipoid CAH (20,22-desmolase)	Very rare	201710	StAR; P450scc	8p11.2 15q23-q24	Transport of cholesterol Cholesterol→	Into mitochondria Pregnenolone	↓	↓

== Screening ==
Currently, in the United States and over 40 other countries, every child born is screened for 21-hydroxylase CAH at birth. This test detects elevated levels of 17α-hydroxyprogesterone (17-OHP). Detecting high levels of 17-OHP enables early detection of CAH. Newborns detected early enough can be placed on medication and live relatively normal lives.

The screening process, however, is characterized by a high false-positive rate. In one study, CAH screening had the lowest positive predictive value (111 true-positive cases among 20,647 abnormal screening results in a 2-year period, or 0.53%, compared with 6.36% for biotinidase deficiency, 1.84% for congenital hypo-thyroidism, 0.56% for classical galactosemia, and 2.9% for phenylketonuria). According to this estimate, 200 unaffected newborns required clinical and laboratory follow-up for every true case of CAH.

In 2020, Wael AbdAlmageed from USC Information Sciences Institute and Mimi Kim from USC Keck School Of Medicine led a joint study in which they used deep learning technology to analyze the facial morphology and features of CAH patients compared to control. In this cross-sectional study of 102 patients with CAH and 144 control participants, deep learning methods achieved a mean area under the receiver operating characteristic curve of 92% for predicting CAH from facial images. Facial features distinguished patients with CAH from controls, and analyses of facial regions found that the nose and upper face were most contributory. The findings suggest that facial morphologic features, as analyzed by deep neural network techniques, can be used as a phenotypic biomarker to predict CAH.

== Treatment ==
Since the clinical manifestations of each form of CAH are unique and depend to a large extent on the underlying enzyme defects, their precursor retention and defective products, the therapeutic goal of CAH is to replenish insufficient adrenal hormones and suppress excess of precursors.

Treatment of all forms of CAH may include any of:

1. Supplying enough glucocorticoid to reduce hyperplasia and overproduction of androgens or mineralocorticoids
2. Providing replacement mineralocorticoid and extra salt if the person is deficient
3. Providing replacement testosterone or estrogens at puberty if the person is deficient
4. Additional treatments to optimize growth by delaying puberty or delaying bone maturation

If CAH is caused by the deficiency of the 21-hydroxylase enzyme, then treatment aims to normalize levels of androstenedione, but normalization of 17α-hydroxyprogesterone is a sign of overtreatment. Treatment can be monitored by measuring androstenedione and 17α-hydroxyprogesterone levels in blood or saliva.

Crinecerfont (Crenessity) was approved for medical use in the United States in December 2024.

== Epidemiology ==
The incidence varies ethnically. In the United States, congenital adrenal hyperplasia in its classical form is particularly common in Native Americans and Yupik Inuit (incidence 1/280). Globally, the incidence of the classical form is estimated to be between 1/15,000 and 1/20,000. Nonclassical CAH is much more common, with a prevalence of around 1/1,000 births.

Continued treatment and wellness are enhanced by education and follow up.

== History ==
=== Before the twentieth century ===
Italian anatomist Luigi De Crecchio (1832–1894) provided the earliest known description of a case of probable CAH.

I propose in this narrative that it is sometimes extremely difficult and even impossible to determine sex during life. In one of the anatomical theaters of the hospital..., there arrived toward the end of January a cadaver which in life was the body of a certain Joseph Marzo... The general physiognomy was decidedly male in all respects. There were no feminine curves to the body. There was a heavy beard. There was some delicacy of structure with muscles that were not very well developed... The distribution of pubic hair was typical of the male. Perhaps the lower extremities were somewhat delicate, resembling the female, and were covered with hair... The penis was curved posteriorly and measured 6 cm, or with stretching, 10 cm. The corona was 3 cm long and 8 cm in circumference. There was an ample prepuce. There was a first grade hypospadias... There were two folds of skin coming from the top of the penis and encircling it on either side. These were somewhat loose and resembled labia majora.

De Crecchio then described the internal organs, which included a normal vagina, uterus, fallopian tubes, and ovaries.

It was of the greatest importance to determine the habits, tendencies, passions, and general character of this individual... I was determined to get as complete a story as possible, determined to get at the base of the facts and to avoid undue exaggeration which was rampant in the conversation of many of the people present at the time of the dissection.

He interviewed many people and satisfied himself that Joseph Marzo "conducted himself within the sexual area exclusively as a male", even to the point of contracting the "French disease" (syphilis) on two occasions. The cause of death was another in a series of episodes of vomiting and diarrhea. This account was translated by Alfred Bongiovanni from De Crecchio ("Sopra un caso di apparenzi virili in una donna". Morgagni 7:154–188, 1865) in 1963 for an article in The New England Journal of Medicine.

The late-onset variant of CAH, which is comparatively much less severe than its classical counterpart, was first described in 1957 by Jacques Decourt, and then given the name "nonclassical" in 1982.

== Society and culture ==
=== People with CAH ===
Notable people with CAH include:

- Jeff Cagandahan, a Filipino who successfully appealed for a change of name and gender on his birth certificate
- Lisa Lee Dark, a Welsh singer
- Betsy Driver, the first openly intersex mayor in the United States
- Thea Hillman, an American poet and intersex activist
- Casimir Pulaski, hypothesized based on examination of remains
- Hida Viloria, an American author and intersex activist
- Christiane Völling, the first intersex person known to have successfully sued for damages in a case brought for non-consensual surgical intervention

== See also ==
- Disorders of sex development
- Inborn errors of steroid metabolism
- List of vaginal anomalies
- 5α-reductase 2 deficiency
- Androgen insensitivity syndrome
