= Lisa Lee Dark =

Welsh singer

- Born: 16 April 1981 (age 45)
- Origin: Swansea, Wales
- Genres: Opera, classical crossover, Christian, new-age, dance
- Occupations: Opera singer, songwriter, voice actress
- Instrument: Vocals
- Years active: 1992–present
- Labels: Angel Guardian Records, VIP international Records
- Website: Blog

Lisa Lee Dark is a Welsh opera singer, songwriter, and voice actress.

== Early life ==
Lisa Lee Dark was born in the Clydach area of Swansea on 16 April 1981. Her distant relatives include Italian opera singer Adelina Patti. She was born with the rare medical condition congenital adrenal hyperplasia, which leads to excessive generation of testosterone during the early part of foetal life. This meant that she was assigned male at birth and raised as such because doctors failed to realise that she was born with a virilised female reproductive system, a fact even she did not discover until she was 19 years old. She was very badly bullied during her school years. She went to an all-boys comprehensive school where she would regularly get kicked, punched, spat at, and have obscene things screamed at her; even outside school, she would get the same treatment because she was slightly different and did not behave like all the other boys. This left her with agoraphobia and PTSD.

== Music career ==
At age 12 she was discovered while singing in a park in Swansea. In 2000 she released a compilation CD of ten years of her recordings she called The Unknown Story of Lisa-Lee Dark. In 2004, Dark released an album entitled Breath of Life. As of 2009 it had sold 50,000 copies. She has released several more since, including one in French. She had previously worked on films, backing tracks and voiceovers.

Dark claims an 8–9 octave vocal range.
