= Hirsutism =

Excessive hair growth on parts of the body where hair is usually minimal

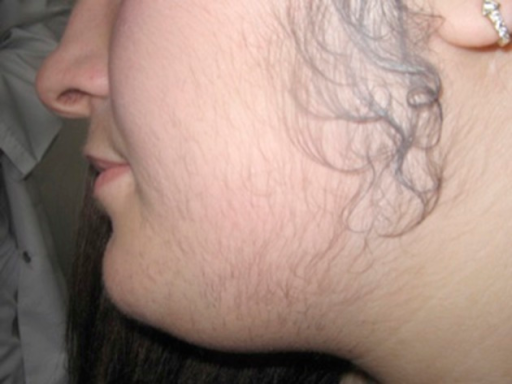
- Hirsutism depicted in a female patient with polyendocrine metabolic ovarian syndrome and nonclassic congenital adrenal hyperplasia
- Specialty: Dermatology, endocrinology
- Causes: PMOS
- Treatment: Birth control pills, antiandrogens, insulin sensitizers

Hirsutism is excessive body hair on parts of the body where hair is normally absent or minimal. The word is from the early 17th century: from Latin hirsutus meaning "hairy". It usually refers to a male pattern of hair growth in a female that may be a sign of a more serious medical condition, especially if it develops well after puberty. Cultural stigma against hirsutism can cause much psychological distress and social difficulty. Discrimination based on facial hirsutism often leads to the avoidance of social situations and to symptoms of anxiety and depression.

Hirsutism is usually the result of an underlying endocrine imbalance, which may be adrenal, ovarian, or central. It can be caused by increased levels of androgen hormones. The amount and location of the hair is measured by a Ferriman–Gallwey score. It is different from hypertrichosis, which is excessive hair growth anywhere on the body.

Treatments may include certain birth control pills, antiandrogens, or insulin sensitizers.

Hirsutism affects between 5 and 15% of women across all ethnic backgrounds. Depending on the definition and the underlying data, approximately 40% of women have some degree of facial hair. About 10 to 15% of cases of hirsutism are idiopathic with no known cause.

== Causes ==
The causes of hirsutism can be divided into endocrine imbalances and non-endocrine etiologies. It is important to begin by first determining the distribution of body hair growth. If hair growth follows a male distribution, it could indicate the presence of increased androgens or hyperandrogenism. However, there are other hormones not related to androgens that can lead to hirsutism. A detailed history is taken by a provider in search of possible causes for hyperandrogenism or other non-endocrine-related causes. If the distribution of hair growth occurs throughout the body, this is referred to as hypertrichosis, not hirsutism.

=== Endocrine causes ===
Endocrine causes of hirsutism include:

- Ovarian cysts such as in polyendocrine metabolic ovarian syndrome (PMOS), the most common cause in women.
- Adrenal gland tumors, adrenocortical adenomas, and adrenocortical carcinoma, as well as adrenal hyperplasia due to pituitary adenomas (as in Cushing's disease).
- Inborn errors of steroid metabolism such as in congenital adrenal hyperplasia, most commonly caused by 21-hydroxylase deficiency.
- Acromegaly and gigantism (growth hormone and IGF-1 excess), usually due to pituitary tumors.

=== Non-endocrine causes ===
Causes of hirsutism not related to hyperandrogenism include:

- Familial: Family history of hirsutism with normal androgen levels.
- Drug-induced: medications were used before the onset of hirsutism. The recommendation is to stop the medication and replace it with another.
  - Minoxidil
  - Androgens like testosterone, anabolic steroids, and androgenic progestins
- Valproic acid and methyldopa
- Pregnancy: Due to changes in hormone production
- Idiopathic: When no other cause can be attributed to an individual's hirsutism, the cause is considered idiopathic by exclusion. In these cases, menstrual cycles and levels of conventionally tested androgens (testosterone, androstenedione, and dehydroepiandrosterone sulfate) are normal. Around 10 to 15% of women with hirsutism have idiopathic hirsutism. Idiopathic hirsutism may be due to increased production of dihydrotestosterone (DHT) in hair follicles and hence may actually still be due to hyperandrogenism. It may be detectable by measurement of DHT or DHT metabolites.
  - Rice et al. 2016 propose that idiopathic hirsutism is caused by epigenetic inheritance of discordant epigenetic markers. It is testable with current technology.

Hormonal causes:	Description:	Clinical cues:
Polyendocrine metabolic ovarian syndrome	PMOS, formerly known as polycystic ovary syndrome (PCOS), is a condition characterized by excess androgens that can lead to hirsutism, irregular periods, and even infertility. The excess androgens can lead to disruptions in normal body hormones in the hypothalamic-pituitary-gonadal axis leading to these symptoms. With PCOS, hair may grow on the face (like on the upper lip, chin, or jawline), chest, stomach, and back.	Characterized by having two of three Rotterdam criteria: Oligomenorrhea (fewer than eight menses in a year); Clinical or biochemical evidence of hyperandrogenism; Polycystic ovaries on ultrasound
Cushing's syndrome	Cushing syndrome occurs when there is an endogenous or exogenous elevated levels of cortisol. One cause of endogenous Cushing syndrome is an adrenocorticotrophic hormone-secreting pituitary adenoma that is responsible for high secretion of not just cortisol but also androgens from the pituitary gland.	Cushing syndrome has an apparent symptoms including: Hirsutism weight gain, extra fat build up around the face, abdominal striae, and irregular menstruation.
Congenital adrenal hyperplasia	CAH can be attributed to several enzymatic deficiencies but the most common is 21-beta-hydroxylase. In CAH, a missing enzyme responsible for normal cortisol synthesis creates a build-up of androgen precursors. This precursor gets shunted to the androgen synthesis pathway leading to increased levels of androgen. Classical CAH is discovered at birth due to increased androgens during development causing ambiguous genitalia. Meanwhile, non-classical CAH is found in puberty presenting as anovulation.	Can present similar to PCOS in non-classical CAH. Increase levels of 17-hydroxyprogesterone.
Androgen-secreting tumors	Tumors in the adrenal glands or in the ovaries leading to increase levels of androgens.	Rapid progression and virilization symptoms.
Other less common hormonal causes:	Acromegaly: Elevated levels of insulin-like growth factor-1. Hyperthyroidism or hypothyroidism: Elevated or decreased levels of thyroid hormones. Hyperprolactinemia: Elevated levels of prolactin.	Each of these has their own distinct presentation.

== Diagnosis ==
Hirsutism is a clinical diagnosis of excessive androgenic, terminal hair growth. A complete physical evaluation should be done prior to initiating more extensive studies, the examiner should differentiate between widespread body hair increase and male pattern virilization. One method of evaluating hirsutism is the Ferriman-Gallwey Score which gives a score based on the amount and location of hair growth. The Ferriman-Gallwey Score has various cutoffs due to variable expressivity of hair growth based on ethnic background.

Diagnosis of patients with even mild hirsutism should include assessment of ovulation and ovarian ultrasound, due to the high prevalence of polyendocrine metabolic ovarian syndrome (PMOS), as well as 17α-hydroxyprogesterone (because of the possibility of finding non-classic 21-hydroxylase deficiency). People with hirsutism may present with an elevated serum dehydroepiandrosterone sulfate (DHEA-S) level, however, additional imaging is required to discriminate between malignant and benign etiologies of adrenal hyperandrogenism. Levels greater than 700 μg/dL are indicative of adrenal gland dysfunction, particularly congenital adrenal hyperplasia due to 21-hydroxylase deficiency. However, PMOS and idiopathic hirsutism make up 90% of cases.

== Treatment ==
Treatment of hirsutism is indicated when hair growth causes patient distress. The two main approaches to treatment are pharmacologic therapies targeting androgen production/action, and direct hair removal methods including electrolysis and photo-epilation. These may be used independently or in combination.

=== Pharmacologic therapies ===
Common medications consist of antiandrogens, insulin sensitizers, and oral contraceptive pills. All three types of therapy have demonstrated efficacy on their own, however insulin sensitizers are shown to be less effective than antiandrogens and oral contraceptive pills. The therapies may be combined, as directed by a physician, in line with the patient's medical goals. Antiandrogens are drugs that block the effects of androgens like testosterone and dihydrotestosterone (DHT) in the body. They are the most effective pharmacologic treatment for patient-important hirsutism, however they have teratogenic potential, and are therefore not recommended in people who are pregnant or desire pregnancy. Current data does not favor any one type of oral contraceptive over another.

List of medications:

- Bicalutamide: A pure antiandrogen. It is effective similarly to flutamide but is much safer as well as better-tolerated.
- Birth control pills that consist of an estrogen, usually ethinylestradiol, and a progestin are supported by the evidence. They are functional antiandrogens. In addition, certain birth control pills contain a progestin that also has antiandrogenic activity. Examples include birth control pills containing cyproterone acetate, chlormadinone acetate, drospirenone, and dienogest.
- Cyproterone acetate: A dual antiandrogen and progestogen. In addition to single form, it is also available in some formulations of combined oral contraceptives at a low dosage (see below). It has a risk of liver damage.
- Eflornithine: Blocks putrescine that is necessary for the growth of hair follicles.
- Finasteride and dutasteride: 5α-Reductase inhibitors. They inhibit the production of the potent androgen DHT. A meta-analysis showed inconsistent results of finasteride in the treatment of hirsutism.
- Flutamide: A pure antiandrogen. It has been found to possess equivalent or greater effectiveness than spironolactone, cyproterone acetate, and finasteride in the treatment of hirsutism. However, it has a high risk of liver damage and hence is no longer recommended as a first- or second-line treatment. Flutamide is safe and effective.
- GnRH analogues: Suppress androgen production by the gonads and reduce androgen concentrations to castrate levels.
- Metformin: Insulin sensitizer. Antihyperglycemic drug used for diabetes mellitus and treatment of hirsutism associated with insulin resistance (e.g. polyendocrine metabolic ovarian syndrome (PMOS)). Metformin appears ineffective in the treatment of hirsutism, although the evidence was of low quality.
- Spironolactone: An antimineralocorticoid with additional antiandrogenic activity at high dosages.

=== Other methods ===
- Electrology
- Epilation
- Laser hair removal
- Lifestyle change, including reducing excessive weight and addressing insulin resistance, may be beneficial. Insulin resistance can cause excessive testosterone levels in women, resulting in hirsutism.
- Shaving
- Waxing

== See also ==
- Androgenic hair
- Bearded lady
- Ferriman-Gallwey score
- Hair removal
- Hypertrichosis
- Laser hair removal
- Petrus Gonsalvus
- Polyendocrine metabolic ovarian syndrome (PMOS)
- Pubic hair
- Social model of disability
- Trichophilia
