= Glucocorticoid deficiency 1 =

- Other names: FGD or GCCD
- Glucocorticoid deficiency 1 is inherited in an autosomal recessive manner

Glucocorticoid deficiency 1 is an adrenocortical failure characterized by low levels of plasma cortisol produced by the adrenal gland despite high levels of plasma ACTH. This is an inherited disorder with several different causes which define the type.

FGD type 1 (FGD1 or GCCD1) is caused by mutations in the ACTH receptor (melanocortin 2 receptor; MC2R). FGD type 2 is caused by mutations in the MC2R accessory protein (MRAP). These two types account for 45% of all cases of FGD.

Some cases of FGD type 3 are caused by mutations in the steroidogenic acute regulatory protein (StAR), with similarity to the nonclassic form of lipoid congenital adrenal hyperplasia. In this case, a general impairment in not just adrenal steroid production, but gonadal steroid production can affect sexual development and fertility. The causes of other cases of FGD type 3 not due to StAR are currently unknown.
