= Glucocorticoid deficiency =

Human disease

Glucocorticoid deficiency is a condition where the body does not produce enough glucocorticoid hormones.

== Signs and symptoms ==
Symptoms of glucocorticoid deficiency (having not enough hormones that are classified as glucocorticoids, and mostly consisting of cortisol) vary depending on the underlying cause and severity—common signs and symptoms may include fatigue, weakness, weight loss, decreased appetite, low blood pressure, salt cravings, dizziness upon standing (orthostatic hypotension), muscle aches and pains, joint pain or stiffness, nausea or vomiting. In severe cases, individuals may experience abdominal pain, confusion or delirium.

=== Complications ===
If left untreated or inadequately treated, glucocorticoid deficiency can lead to severe complications such as adrenal crisis (a life-threatening condition characterized by extreme fatigue, dehydration, and electrolyte imbalances), low blood sugar (hypoglycemia), and recurrent infections due to impaired immune function.

== Causes ==
Glucocorticoid deficiency can be caused by inherited genetic disorders that affect the production of cortisol in the adrenal glands, such as familial glucocorticoid deficiency (FGD). FGD is a group of monogenic recessive disorders caused by disease-causing variants in genes involved in cortisol biosynthesis. FGD is categorized into type 1, also called Glucocorticoid deficiency 1, where genes associated with ACTH have disease-causing variants, type 2, where ACTH receptors are normal, and there are other types: 3, 4 and 5, associated with various causes. Glucocorticoid deficiency can also be acquired after birth due to damage or dysfunction of the hypothalamus-pituitary-adrenal axis (HPA axis), which regulates cortisol production. Common causes of acquired glucocorticoid deficiency include autoimmune conditions affecting the HPA axis (such as autoimmune adrenalitis) and infections, such as tuberculosis, that affect the adrenal glands directly.

== Risk factors ==
Risk factors for developing glucocorticoid deficiency include having a family history of inherited genetic disorders affecting cortisol biosynthesis by the body; having autoimmune conditions such as Addison's disease; having infections that specifically target the adrenal glands; undergoing surgery involving removal of the pituitary gland or parts of it.

=== Triggers ===
Glucocorticoid deficiency can be triggered by stressors such as illness/infection/surgery/trauma, which increase demand for cortisol production from the adrenals. In individuals with already compromised HPA axis function or inadequate cortisol reserve, this increased demand for glucocorticoid hormones cannot be met, leading to acute exacerbation of glucocorticoid insufficiency/adrenal crisis.

== Prevention ==
There are no specific measures known for preventing primary forms of glucocorticoid deficiency unless there is an identified genetic mutation causing it. For secondary forms, prevention includes prompt treatment, i.e., addressing underlying causes such as infection and autoimmune diseases.

== Treatment ==
The treatment of glucocorticoid deficiency involves replacing the deficient cortisol through exogenous glucocorticoid therapy. This typically includes oral administration of synthetic glucocorticoids such as hydrocortisone or prednisone, which aim to mimic the normal physiological secretion of cortisol. The dosage and timing of medication may vary depending on individual needs and circumstances.

== Prognosis ==
With appropriate treatment, most individuals with glucocorticoid deficiency can lead normal lives and have a good prognosis. However, it is important to closely monitor hormone levels and adjust medication accordingly to prevent complications such as adrenal crisis or over-replacement side effects.

== Epidemiology ==
The exact incidence and prevalence of glucocorticoid deficiency are not well established due to its heterogeneity in causes and clinical presentation. Familial Glucocorticoid Deficiency is considered rare but more common than previously thought due to underdiagnosis and lack of awareness about the condition.
