= 11-Deoxycortisol =

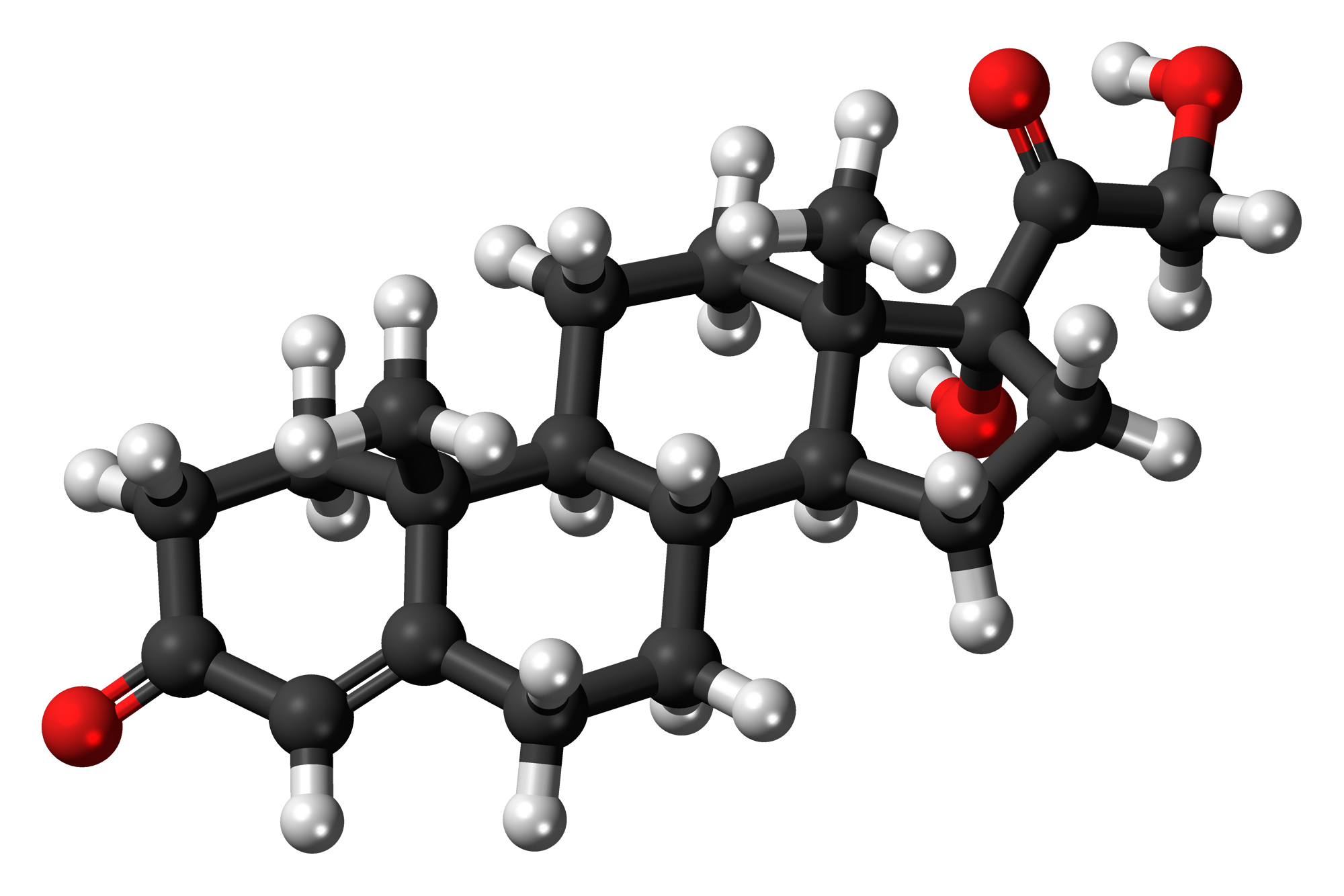

Names
- IUPAC name 17α,21-Dihydroxypregn-4-ene-3,20-dione
- Systematic IUPAC name (1R,3aS,3bR,9aR,9bS,11aS)-1-Hydroxy-1-(2-hydroxy-1-oxoethyl)-9a,11a-dimethyl-1,2,3,3a,3b,4,5,8,9,9a,9b,10,11,11a-tetradecahydro-7H-cyclopenta[a]phenanthren-7-one
- Other names 11-Deoxycortisol; 11-Deoxycortisone; Cortoxelone; 17α,21-Dihydroxyprogesterone; 11-Desoxycortisol; 11-Deoxyhydrocortisone; 11-Desoxyhydrocortisone; 17α-Hydroxy-11-deoxycorticosterone; Reichstein's Substance S; Compound S; Cortodoxone; Cortexolone,

Identifiers
CAS Number	152-58-9
3D model (JSmol)	Interactive image
ChEBI	CHEBI:28324
ChEMBL	ChEMBL253144
ChemSpider	389582
ECHA InfoCard	100.005.279
IUPHAR/BPS	5100
KEGG	D03595
PubChem CID	440707
UNII	WDT5SLP0HQ
CompTox Dashboard (EPA)	DTXSID8045642
- InChI: InChI=1S/C21H30O4/c1-19-8-5-14(23)11-13(19)3-4-15-16(19)6-9-20(2)17(15)7-10-21(20,25)18(24)12-22/h11,15-17,22,25H,3-10,12H2,1-2H3/t15-,16+,17+,19+,20+,21+/m1/s1 Key: WHBHBVVOGNECLV-OBQKJFGGSA-N; InChI=1/C21H30O4/c1-19-8-5-14(23)11-13(19)3-4-15-16(19)6-9-20(2)17(15)7-10-21(20,25)18(24)12-22/h11,15-17,22,25H,3-10,12H2,1-2H3/t15-,16+,17+,19+,20+,21+/m1/s1 Key: WHBHBVVOGNECLV-OBQKJFGGBG
- SMILES: O=C4\C=C2/[C@]([C@H]1CC[C@@]3([C@@](O)(C(=O)CO)CC[C@H]3[C@@H]1CC2)C)(C)CC4

Properties
Chemical formula	C_{21}H_{30}O_{4}
Molar mass	346.467 g·mol^{−1}
Melting point	215 °C (419 °F; 488 K)
- Except where otherwise noted, data are given for materials in their standard state (at 25 °C [77 °F], 100 kPa). verify (what is ?) Infobox references

11-Deoxycortisol, also known as cortodoxone (INN), cortexolone as well as 17α,21-dihydroxyprogesterone or 17α,21-dihydroxypregn-4-ene-3,20-dione, is an endogenous glucocorticoid steroid hormone, and a metabolic intermediate toward cortisol. The compound was first described by Tadeusz Reichstein in 1938 as Substance S, thus has also been referred to as Reichstein's Substance S or Compound S.

== Function ==
Steroidogenesis, showing 11-deoxycortisol in the pathway from cholesterol to cortisol.

11-Deoxycortisol acts as a glucocorticoid, though is less potent than cortisol.

11-Deoxycortisol is synthesized from 17α-hydroxyprogesterone by 21-hydroxylase and is converted to cortisol by 11β-hydroxylase.

11-Deoxycortisol in mammals has limited biological activity and mainly acts as metabolic intermediate within the glucocorticoid pathway, leading to cortisol. However, in sea lampreys, an early jawless fish species that originated over 500 million years ago, 11-deoxycortisol is the primary and ultimate glucocorticoid hormone with mineralocorticoid properties; 11-deoxycortisol also takes part, by binding to specific corticosteroid receptors, in intestinal osmoregulation in sea lamprey at metamorphosis, during which they develop seawater tolerance before downstream migration. Sea lampreys do not possess the 11β-hydroxylase enzyme (CYP11B1) responsible for converting 11-deoxycortisol to cortisol and 11-deoxycorticosterone to corticosterone, as observed in mammals. The absence of this enzyme in sea lampreys indicates the existence of a complex and highly specific corticosteroid signaling pathway that emerged at least 500 million years ago with the advent of early vertebrates. The lack of cortisol and corticosterone in sea lampreys suggests that the presence of the 11β-hydroxylase enzyme may have been absent during the early stages of vertebrate evolution. The absence of cortisol and corticosterone in sea lampreys suggests that the 11β-hydroxylase enzyme may not have been present early in vertebrate evolution.

== Clinical significance ==
11-Deoxycortisol in mammals has limited glucocorticoid activity, but it is the direct precursor of the major mammalian glucocorticoid, cortisol. As a result, the level of 11-deoxycortisol is measured to diagnose impaired cortisol synthesis, to find out the enzyme deficiency that causes impairment along the pathway to cortisol, and to differentiate adrenal disorders.

In 11β-hydroxylase deficiency, 11-deoxycortisol and 11-deoxycorticosterone levels increase, and excess of 11-deoxycorticosterone leads to mineralocorticoid-based hypertension (as opposed to 21-hydroxylase deficiency, in which patients have low blood pressure from a lack of mineralocorticoids). Low levels of cortisol can affect blood pressure by causing a decrease in sodium retention and volume expansion. This effect occurs because cortisol regulates the balance of water and electrolytes in the body. When cortisol levels are low, there is less sodium reabsorption by the kidneys, leading to increased excretion of sodium through urine. This ultimately reduces blood volume and lowers blood pressure. On the other hand, high levels of cortisol can also affect blood pressure by causing an increase in sodium retention and volume expansion. Cortisol-induced hypertension is accompanied by significant sodium retention, leading to an increase in extracellular fluid volume and exchangeable sodium. This expansion results in an increase in blood volume and subsequently increases blood pressure. The underlying mechanisms for these effects involve various factors such as suppression of the nitric oxide system, alterations in vascular responsiveness to pressor agonists like adrenaline, increased cardiac output or stroke volume due to plasma volume expansion, and potential dysregulation of glucocorticoid receptors or 11β-hydroxylase enzyme activity. These mechanisms may be relevant to cortisol-induced hypertension and to conditions such as Cushing's syndrome (excess cortisol production), apparent mineralocorticoid excess (related to defects in 11β-hydroxylase enzymes), licorice abuse (glycyrrhetinic acid affecting glycyrrhetinic acid receptor), chronic renal failure (prolonged half-life of cortisol due to reduced 11β-hydroxylase activity), and even essential hypertension where there may be abnormalities with 11β-hydroxylase activity or glucocorticoid receptor variations. Low levels of cortisol lead to reduced vascular tone as cortisol helps maintain normal vascular tone by promoting vasoconstriction. Low levels of cortisol can lead to decreased vasoconstriction, resulting in relaxed blood vessels and lower overall blood pressure. Also, low cortisol levels lead to impaired fluid balance, as cortisol affects fluid balance by influencing sodium and water reabsorption in the kidneys. When cortisol levels are low, sodium absorption may be reduced, leading to increased excretion of sodium in the urine and subsequent lowering of blood volume and blood pressure. Additionally, low levels of cortisol cause a dysregulated renin-angiotensin system, as cortisol interacts with the renin-angiotensin system, which regulates blood pressure through vasoconstriction and fluid balance. Low cortisol levels can disrupt this system, leading to altered angiotensin production, reduced aldosterone secretion, and subsequently lower blood pressure. Conversely, high levels of cortisol lead to increased vascular tone, enhanced sodium retention, and increased sympathetic activity. Stress-induced release of high-level glucocorticoids such as cortisol activates the sympathetic nervous system (SNS). The SNS controls heart rate, cardiac output, and vasomotor tone, causing constriction, and thereby increasing peripheral arterial resistance, resulting in an increase in blood pressure. In 11β-hydroxylase deficiency, 11-deoxycortisol can also be converted to androstenedione in a pathway that could explain the increase in androstenedione levels this condition.

In 21-hydroxylase deficiency, 11-deoxycortisol levels are low.

== History ==
In 1934, biochemist Tadeus Reichstein, working in Switzerland, began research on extracts from animal adrenal glands in order to isolate physiologically active compounds. He was publishing results of his findings along the way. By 1944, he already isolated and explained the chemical structure of 29 pure substances. He was assigning names that consisted of the word "Substance" and a letter from the Latin alphabet to the newly found substances. In 1938, he published an article about "Substance R" and "Substance S" describing their chemical structures and properties. The Substance S since about 1955 became known as 11-Deoxycortisol.

In 1949, American research chemist Percy Lavon Julian, in looking for ways to produce cortisone, announced the synthesis of the Compound S, from the cheap and readily available pregnenolone (synthesized from the soybean oil sterol stigmasterol).

On 5 April 1952, biochemist Durey Peterson and microbiologist Herbert Murray at Upjohn, published the first report of a breakthrough fermentation process for the microbial 11α-oxygenation of steroids (e.g. progesterone) in a single step by common molds of the order Mucorales. 11α-oxygenation of Compound S produces 11α-hydrocortisone, which can be chemically oxidized to cortisone, or converted by further chemical steps to 11β-hydrocortisone (cortisol).

== See also ==
- 11-Deoxycorticosterone
- Cortexolone 17α-propionate
