= HSD3B2 =

Protein-coding gene in humans

Identifiers
- Aliases: HSD3B2, HSD3B, HSDB, SDR11E2, hydroxy-delta-5-steroid dehydrogenase, 3 beta- and steroid delta-isomerase 2
- External IDs: OMIM: 613890; MGI: 96233; GeneCards: HSD3B2
Enzyme activity
EC #	BRENDA	ExPASy	KEGG	MetaCyc
1.1.1.145	↗	↗	↗	↗
5.3.3.1	↗	↗	↗	↗

Gene location (Human)
Chr.	Chromosome 1 (human)
Band	1p12	Start	119,414,931 bp
Band	1p12	End	119,423,035 bp

Gene location (Mouse)
Chr.	Chromosome 3 (mouse)
Band	3 F2.2|3 42.89 cM	Start	98,759,510 bp
Band	3 F2.2|3 42.89 cM	End	98,767,110 bp
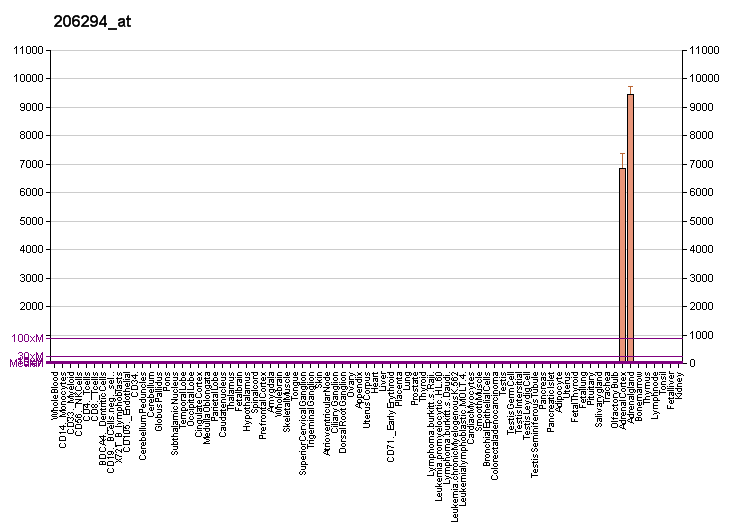
RNA expression pattern
Bgee	Human / Mouse (ortholog); Top expressed in: right adrenal gland; right adrenal cortex; left adrenal gland; left adrenal cortex; testicle; oocyte; mucosa of transverse colon; placenta; secondary oocyte; right coronary artery / Top expressed in: adrenal gland; cumulus cell; Gonadal ridge; adrenal medulla; ovary; testicle; urethra; spermatocyte; renal pelvis; embryo; More reference expression data
BioGPS	More reference expression data
Gene ontology
Molecular function	oxidoreductase activity, acting on the CH-OH group of donors, NAD or NADP as acceptor; isomerase activity; catalytic activity; oxidoreductase activity; 3-beta-hydroxy-delta5-steroid dehydrogenase activity; steroid delta-isomerase activity; cholesterol dehydrogenase activity
Cellular component	integral component of membrane; endoplasmic reticulum membrane; mitochondrial membranes; membrane; mitochondrial intermembrane space; smooth endoplasmic reticulum membrane; endoplasmic reticulum; mitochondrion; mitochondrial inner membrane; intracellular membrane-bounded organelle
Biological process	androgen biosynthetic process; glucocorticoid biosynthetic process; mineralocorticoid biosynthetic process; metabolism; steroid biosynthetic process; C21-steroid hormone metabolic process; hippocampus development; response to corticosterone
Sources:Amigo / QuickGO
Orthologs
Databases	NCBI: entry; OMA: entry
Species	Human	Mouse
Entrez	3284	15492
Ensembl	ENSG00000203859	ENSMUSG00000027871
UniProt	P26439; Q5QP01	P24815
RefSeq (mRNA)	NM_001166120; NM_000198	NM_008293; NM_001304800
RefSeq (protein)	NP_000189; NP_001159592	NP_001291729; NP_032319
Location (UCSC)	Chr 1: 119.41 – 119.42 Mb	Chr 3: 98.76 – 98.77 Mb
PubMed search
- Wikidata
View/Edit Human	View/Edit Mouse

HSD3B2 is a human gene that encodes for 3beta-hydroxysteroid dehydrogenase/delta(5)-delta(4)isomerase type II or hydroxy-delta-5-steroid dehydrogenase, 3 beta- and steroid delta-isomerase 2. It is expressed principally in steroidogenic tissues and is essential for steroid hormone production. A notable exception is the placenta, where HSD3B1 is critical for progesterone production by this tissue.

Mutations in the HSD3B2 gene result in the condition congenital adrenal hyperplasia due to 3 beta-hydroxysteroid dehydrogenase deficiency.
