= HSD3B1 =

Protein-coding gene in humans

Identifiers
- Aliases: HSD3B1, 3BETAHSD, HSD3B, HSDB3, HSDB3A, SDR11E1, hydroxy-delta-5-steroid dehydrogenase, 3 beta- and steroid delta-isomerase 1
- External IDs: OMIM: 109715; MGI: 109598; GeneCards: HSD3B1
Enzyme activity
EC #	BRENDA	ExPASy	KEGG	MetaCyc
1.1.1.145	↗	↗	↗	↗
1.1.1.210	↗	↗	↗	↗
1.1.1.270	↗	↗	↗	↗
5.3.3.1	↗	↗	↗	↗

Gene location (Human)
Chr.	Chromosome 1 (human)
Band	1p12	Start	119,507,198 bp
Band	1p12	End	119,515,054 bp

Gene location (Mouse)
Chr.	Chromosome 3 (mouse)
Band	3|3 F2.2	Start	98,712,820 bp
Band	3|3 F2.2	End	98,721,759 bp
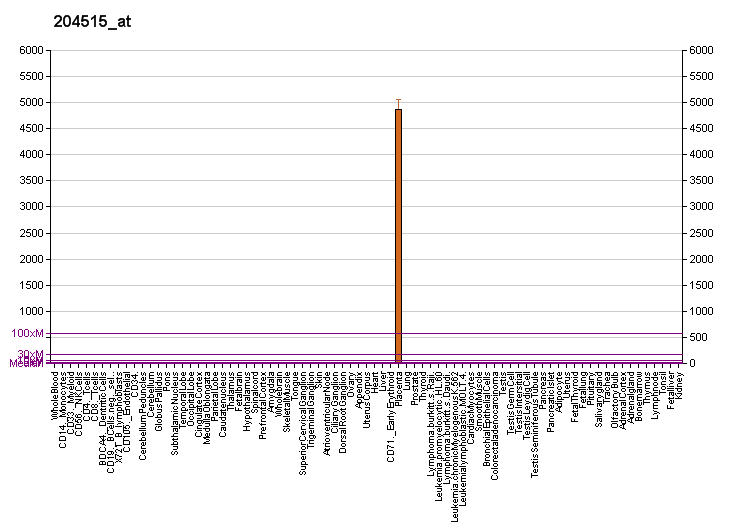
RNA expression pattern
Bgee	Human / Mouse (ortholog); Top expressed in: placenta; decidua; skin of thigh; vulva; right adrenal cortex; left adrenal gland; left adrenal cortex; mucosa of transverse colon; mucosa of ileum; islet of Langerhans / Top expressed in: adrenal gland; genital tubercle; placenta; adrenal medulla; testicle; embryo; yolk sac; tail of embryo; secondary oocyte; pallidum of neuraxis; More reference expression data
BioGPS	More reference expression data
Gene ontology
Molecular function	oxidoreductase activity, acting on the CH-OH group of donors, NAD or NADP as acceptor; isomerase activity; catalytic activity; oxidoreductase activity; steroid delta-isomerase activity; 3-beta-hydroxy-delta5-steroid dehydrogenase activity; cholesterol dehydrogenase activity; 3-keto sterol reductase activity; 5alpha-androstane-3beta,17beta-diol dehydrogenase activity
Cellular component	integral component of membrane; membrane; mitochondrial membranes; mitochondrial intermembrane space; smooth endoplasmic reticulum membrane; endoplasmic reticulum; mitochondrion; mitochondrial inner membrane; endoplasmic reticulum membrane; intracellular membrane-bounded organelle
Biological process	estrogen biosynthetic process; androgen biosynthetic process; glucocorticoid biosynthetic process; mineralocorticoid biosynthetic process; metabolism; steroid biosynthetic process; C21-steroid hormone metabolic process; hippocampus development; response to corticosterone; lipid metabolism; steroid metabolic process
Sources:Amigo / QuickGO
Orthologs
Databases	NCBI: entry; OMA: entry
Species	Human	Mouse
Entrez	3283	15497
Ensembl	ENSG00000203857	ENSMUSG00000027869
UniProt	P14060	O35469
RefSeq (mRNA)	NM_000862; NM_001328615	NM_013821
RefSeq (protein)	NP_000853; NP_001315544	NP_038849
Location (UCSC)	Chr 1: 119.51 – 119.52 Mb	Chr 3: 98.71 – 98.72 Mb
PubMed search
- Wikidata
View/Edit Human	View/Edit Mouse

HSD3B1 is a human gene that encodes for a 3beta-hydroxysteroid dehydrogenase/delta(5)-delta(4)isomerase type I or hydroxy-delta-5-steroid dehydrogenase, 3 beta- and steroid delta-isomerase 1. While it can carry out the same function as HSD3B2, it localizes primarily to different tissues, such as the placenta and nonsteroidogenic tissues. Its requirement for the production of progesterone by the placenta, which has a vital role in pregnancy, may be one reason why no disease based on mutations in this gene has been identified to date, besides prostate cancer.

== Clinical significance ==
The 1245C allele (HSD3B1 adrenal-permissive homozygous genotype 1245 C/C) encodes for a missense and hyperactive enzyme that increases extragonadal androgen synthesis and is associated with poorer outcomes after androgen deprivation therapy in prostate cancer.
