= 17α-Hydroxypregnenolone =

Chemical compound

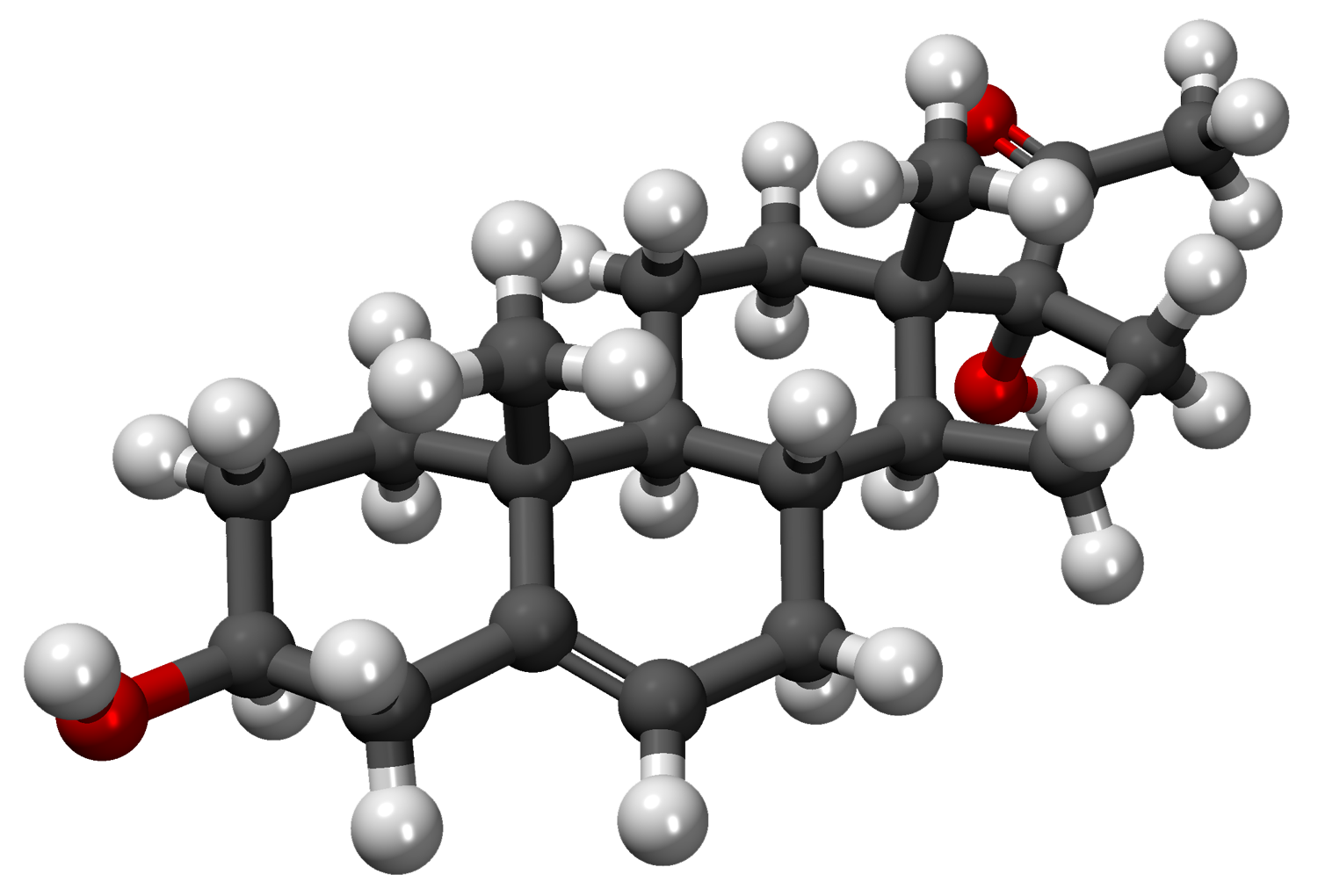

Pharmacokinetic data
- Metabolism: Adrenal, Gonads

Identifiers
- IUPAC name: 3β,17α-dihydroxypregn-5-en-20-one
- CAS Number: 387-79-1
- PubChem CID: 3032570
- ChemSpider: 17215939
- UNII: 77ME40334S
- ChEBI: CHEBI:28750
- CompTox Dashboard (EPA): DTXSID20894988
- ECHA InfoCard: 100.006.239

Chemical and physical data
- Formula: C_{21}H_{32}O_{3}
- Molar mass: 332.484 g·mol^{−1}
- 3D model (JSmol): Interactive image
- Melting point: 268 °C (514 °F)
- SMILES: CC[C@@]2(O)CC[C@H]1[C@@H]3CCC4CC(O)C(=O)C[C@]4(C)[C@H]3CC[C@@]12C
- InChI: InChI=1S/C21H34O3/c1-4-21(24)10-8-16-14-6-5-13-11-17(22)18(23)12-19(13,2)15(14)7-9-20(16,21)3/h13-17,22,24H,4-12H2,1-3H3/t13?,14-,15+,16+,17?,19+,20+,21-/m1/s1; Key:QPLFSAZMHUAMKE-FOCOMJRBSA-N

17α-Hydroxypregnenolone is a pregnane (C21) steroid that is obtained by hydroxylation of pregnenolone at the C17α position. This step is performed by the mitochondrial cytochrome P450 enzyme 17α-hydroxylase (CYP17A1) that is present in the adrenal and gonads. Peak levels are reached in humans at the end of puberty and then decline. High levels are also achieved during pregnancy. It is also a known neuromodulator.

== Prohormone ==
17α-Hydroxypregnenolone is considered a prohormone in the formation of dehydroepiandrosterone (DHEA), itself a prohormone of the sex steroids.

This conversion is mediated by the enzyme 17,20 lyase. As such 17α-hydroxypregnenolone represents an intermediary in the Δ^{5} pathway that leads from pregnenolone to DHEA. 17α-Hydroxypregnenolone is also converted to 17α-hydroxyprogesterone, a prohormone for glucocorticosteroids and androstenedione through the activity of 3α-hydroxysteroid dehydrogenase.

== Clinical use ==
Measurements of 17α-hydroxypregnenolone are useful in the diagnosis of certain forms of congenital adrenal hyperplasia. In patients with congenital adrenal hyperplasia due to 3β-hydroxysteroid dehydrogenase deficiency 17α-hydroxypregnenolone is increased, while in patients with congenital adrenal hyperplasia due to 17α-hydroxylase deficiency levels are low to absent.

== Neurosteroid ==
17α-hydroxypregnenolone is a known neuromodulator as its acts in the central nervous system. Specifically, it is known to modulate locomotion.

== See also ==
- Congenital adrenal hyperplasia
- Narave pig, intersex pigs that have low levels of 17α-Hydroxypregnenolone

== Additional images ==
Steroidogenesis
