= 17α-Hydroxyprogesterone =

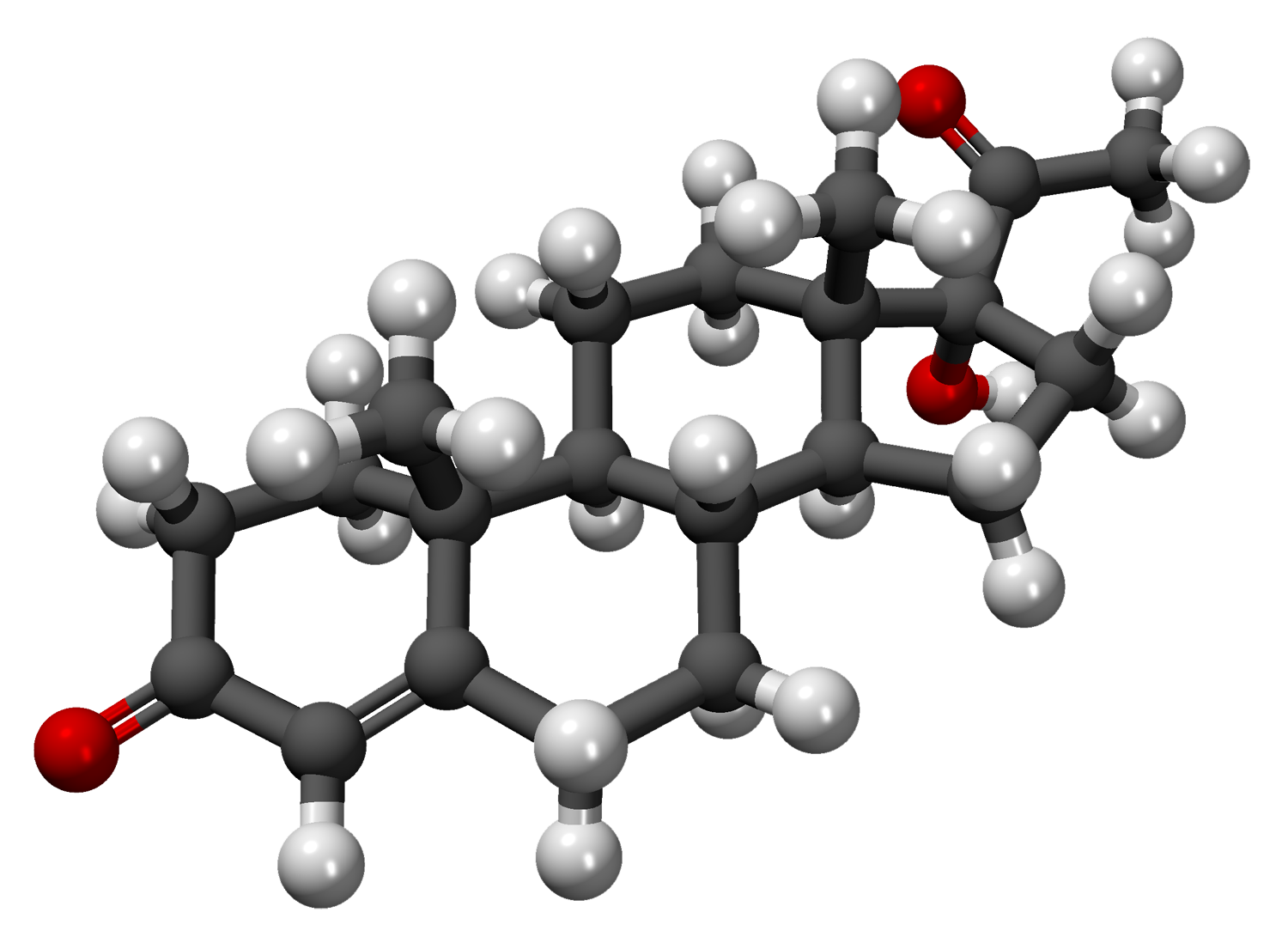

Names
- IUPAC name 17α-Hydroxypregn-4-ene-3,20-dione
- Systematic IUPAC name (1R,3aS,3bR,9aR,9bS,11aS)-1-Acetyl-1-hydroxy-9a,11a-dimethyl-1,2,3,3a,3b,4,5,8,9,9a,9b,10,11,11a-tetradecahydro-7H-cyclopenta[a]phenanthren-7-one
- Other names Hydroxyprogesterone (INN)

Identifiers
CAS Number	68-96-2
3D model (JSmol)	Interactive image
ChEBI	CHEBI:17252
ChEMBL	ChEMBL1062
ChemSpider	6002
ECHA InfoCard	100.000.636
IUPHAR/BPS	5104
KEGG	D08052
PubChem CID	6238
UNII	21807M87J2
CompTox Dashboard (EPA)	DTXSID6040747
- InChI: InChI=1S/C21H30O3/c1-13(22)21(24)11-8-18-16-5-4-14-12-15(23)6-9-19(14,2)17(16)7-10-20(18,21)3/h12,16-18,24H,4-11H2,1-3H3/t16-,17+,18+,19+,20+,21+/m1/s1 Key: DBPWSSGDRRHUNT-CEGNMAFCSA-N
- SMILES: CC(=O)[C@]1(CC[C@@H]2[C@@]1(CC[C@H]3[C@H]2CCC4=CC(=O)CC[C@]34C)C)O

Properties
Chemical formula	C_{21}H_{30}O_{3}
Molar mass	330.46 g/mol
Melting point	219.5
- Except where otherwise noted, data are given for materials in their standard state (at 25 °C [77 °F], 100 kPa). Infobox references

17α-Hydroxyprogesterone (17α-OHP), also known as 17-OH progesterone (17-OHP), or hydroxyprogesterone (OHP), is an endogenous progestogen steroid hormone related to progesterone. It is also a chemical intermediate in the biosynthesis of many other endogenous steroids, including androgens, estrogens, glucocorticoids, and mineralocorticoids, as well as neurosteroids.

== Biological activity ==
17α-OHP is an agonist of the progesterone receptor (PR) similarly to progesterone, albeit weakly in comparison. In addition, it is an antagonist of the mineralocorticoid receptor (MR) as well as a partial agonist of the glucocorticoid receptor (GR), albeit with very low potency (EC_{50} >100-fold less relative to cortisol) at the latter site, also similarly to progesterone.

Relative affinities (%) of hydroxyprogesterone and related steroids
Compound	hPR-A	hPR-B	rbPR	rbGR	rbER
Progesterone	100	100	100	<1	<1
17α-Hydroxyprogesterone	1	1	3	1	<1
Hydroxyprogesterone caproate	26	30	28	4	<1
Hydroxyprogesterone acetate	38	46	115	3	?
Notes: Values are percentages (%). Reference ligands (100%) were progesterone for the PR, dexamethasone for the GR, and estradiol for the ER. Sources: See template.

== Biochemistry ==
Steroidogenesis, showing 17α-OHP around the left-middle among the pregnenes.

=== Biosynthesis ===
17α-OHP is derived from progesterone via 17α-hydroxylase (encoded by CYP17A1).

17α-OHP increases in the third trimester of pregnancy primarily due to fetal adrenal production.

This steroid is primarily produced in the adrenal glands and to some degree in the gonads, specifically the corpus luteum of the ovary. Normal levels are 3-90 ng/dl in children, and in women, 20-100 ng/dl prior to ovulation, and 100-500 ng/dl during the luteal phase.

=== Measurement ===
Measurements of levels of 17α-OHP are useful in the evaluation of patients with suspected congenital adrenal hyperplasia as the typical enzymes that are defective, namely 21-hydroxylase and 11β-hydroxylase, lead to a build-up of 17α-OHP. In contrast, the rare patient with 17α-hydroxylase deficiency will have very low or undetectable levels of 17α-OHP. 17α-OHP levels can also be used to measure contribution of progestational activity of the corpus luteum during pregnancy as progesterone but note, 17α-OHP is also contributed by the placenta.

Immunoassays like RIA (radioimmunoassay) or IRMA (immunoradiometric assay) used to clinically determine 17α-OHP are prone to cross-reactivity with the 17α-OHP steroid precursors and their sulphated conjugates. Gas or liquid chromatography and mass spectrometry (e.g. LC-MS/MS) achieves greater specificity than immunoassays.

Measurement of 17α-OHP by LC-MS/MS improves newborn screening for congenital adrenal hyperplasia due to 21-hydroxylase deficiency, because 17α-OHP steroid precursors and their sulphated conjugates which are present in the first two days after birth and longer in pre-term neonates, cross-react in immunoassays with 17α-OHP, giving falsely high 17α-OHP levels.

== Pharmacology ==
=== Pharmacokinetics ===
Although 17α-OHP has not been used as a medication, its pharmacokinetics have been studied and reviewed.

== Medical uses ==
Esters of 17α-OHP, such as hydroxyprogesterone caproate and, to a far lesser extent, hydroxyprogesterone acetate and hydroxyprogesterone heptanoate, have been used in medicine as progestins.

== Chemistry ==
17α-OHP is the parent compound of a class of progestins referred to as the 17α-hydroxyprogesterone derivatives. Among others, this class of drugs includes chlormadinone acetate, cyproterone acetate, hydroxyprogesterone caproate, medroxyprogesterone acetate, and megestrol acetate.

== Society and culture ==
=== Generic names ===
Hydroxyprogesterone is the generic name of 17α-OHP and its INN and BAN.

== See also ==
- 11α-Hydroxyprogesterone
- 5α-Dihydroprogesterone
- 20-Dihydroprogesterone
- 11-Deoxycorticosterone
- 11-Deoxycortisol
- 17α-Methylprogesterone
- 19-Norprogesterone
- 19-Nortestosterone
