= Mineralocorticoid =

Group of corticosteroids

- Drug class
- Aldosterone, the major endogenous mineralocorticoid

Class identifiers
- Synonyms: Corticosteroid; Mineralocorticosteroid
- ATC code: H02AA
- Biological target: Mineralocorticoid receptor
- Chemical class: Steroids

Legal status

Mineralocorticoids are a class of corticosteroids, which in turn are a class of steroid hormones. Mineralocorticoids are produced in the adrenal cortex and influence salt and water balances (electrolyte balance and fluid balance). The primary mineralocorticoid is aldosterone.

== Physiology ==
The name mineralocorticoid derives from early observations that these hormones were involved in the retention of sodium, a mineral. The primary endogenous mineralocorticoid is aldosterone, although a number of other endogenous hormones (including progesterone and deoxycorticosterone) have mineralocorticoid function.

Aldosterone acts on the kidneys to provide active reabsorption of sodium and an associated passive reabsorption of water, as well as the active secretion of potassium in the principal cells of the cortical collecting tubule and active secretion of protons via proton ATPases in the lumenal membrane of the intercalated cells of the collecting tubule. This in turn results in an increase of blood pressure and blood volume.

Aldosterone is produced in the zona glomerulosa of the cortex of the adrenal gland and its secretion is mediated principally by angiotensin II but also by adrenocorticotrophic hormone (ACTH) and local potassium levels.

== Mode of action ==
The effects of mineralocorticoids are mediated by slow genomic mechanisms through nuclear receptors as well as by fast nongenomic mechanisms through membrane-associated receptors and signaling cascades.

Steroidogenesis, showing mineralocorticoids in ellipse at top right. Note that it is not a strictly bounded group, but a continuum of structures with increasing mineralocorticoid effect, with the primary example aldosterone at top.

=== Genomic mechanisms ===
Mineralocorticoids bind to the mineralocorticoid receptor in the cell cytosol, and are able to freely cross the lipid bilayer of the cell. This type of receptor becomes activated upon ligand binding. After a hormone binds to the corresponding receptor, the newly formed receptor-ligand complex translocates into the cell nucleus, where it binds to many hormone response elements (HREs) in the promoter region of the target genes in the DNA.

The opposite mechanism is called transrepression. The hormone receptor without ligand binding interacts with heat shock proteins and prevents the transcription of targeted genes.

Aldosterone and cortisol (a glucosteroid) have similar affinity for the mineralocorticoid receptor; however, glucocorticoids circulate at roughly 100 times the level of mineralocorticoids. An enzyme exists in mineralocorticoid target tissues to prevent overstimulation by glucocorticoids. This enzyme, 11-beta hydroxysteroid dehydrogenase type II (Protein:HSD11B2), catalyzes the deactivation of glucocorticoids to 11-dehydro metabolites. Licorice is known to be an inhibitor of this enzyme and chronic consumption can result in a condition known as pseudohyperaldosteronism.

== Pathophysiology ==
Hyperaldosteronism (the syndrome caused by elevated aldosterone) is commonly caused by either idiopathic adrenal hyperplasia or by an adrenal adenoma. The two main resulting problems:

1. Hypertension and edema due to excessive Na+ and water retention.
2. Accelerated excretion of potassium ions (K+). With extreme K+ loss there is muscle weakness and eventually paralysis.

Hypoaldosteronism (the syndrome caused by underproduction of aldosterone) leads to the salt-wasting state associated with Addison's disease, although classical congenital adrenal hyperplasia and other disease states may also cause this situation. Acute underproduction (hemorrhagic adrenalitis) is often life-threatening.

== Pharmacology ==
Fludrocortisone, a synthetic mineralocorticoid

An example of a synthetic mineralocorticoid is fludrocortisone (Florinef).

Important antimineralocorticoids are spironolactone and eplerenone.

== See also ==
- List of corticosteroids
