= 11β-Hydroxysteroid dehydrogenase =

Class of enzymes

11β-Hydroxysteroid dehydrogenase (HSD-11β or 11β-HSD) enzymes catalyze the conversion of inert 11 keto-products (e.g. cortisone) to active cortisol, or vice versa, thus regulating the access of glucocorticoids to the steroid receptors.

cortisol
+ NADP^{+}
H^{+}
H^{+}
cortisone
+ NADPH

The human genome encodes two distinct HSD-11β isozymes (HSD-11β Type 1 and HSD-11β Type 2) on distinct genes. The dehydrogenase activity of a HSD-11β converts a 11beta-hydroxysteroid to the corresponding 11-oxosteroid by reducing NADP^{+} or NAD^{+}. HSD-11βs are part of the larger class of oxidoreductases and HSD-11β Type 1 has oxidoreductase activity (the reverse of dehydrogenase activity). HSD-11βs participate in c21-steroid hormone metabolism and androgen and estrogen metabolism.

== Structural studies ==
Several structures for HSD-11β Type 1 have been solved to date with various mutations and inhibitors. There are no known structures for HSD-11β Type 2.

== Function ==
Cortisol. Note the OH at the 11 position on ring C. (The other differences between the diagrams are not of consequence.)

Cortisone

Cortisol, a glucocorticoid, binds the glucocorticoid receptor. However, because of its molecular similarity to aldosterone it also binds the mineralcorticoid receptor at higher concentrations. Both aldosterone and cortisol have a similar affinity for the mineralocorticoid receptor; however, there is vastly more cortisol in circulation than aldosterone. To prevent overstimulation of the mineralocorticoid receptor by cortisol, HSD-11βs convert the biologically active cortisol to the inactive cortisone, which can no longer bind the mineralocorticoid receptor. HSD-11β co-localizes with intracellular adrenal steroid receptors. Licorice, which contains glycyrrhizinic acid and enoxolone, can inhibit HSD-11β and lead to the apparent mineralocorticoid excess syndrome. Cortisol levels consequently rise, and cortisol binding to the mineralocorticoid receptor produces clinical signs and symptoms of hypokalemia, alkalosis and hypertension (i.e., mineralocorticoid excess).

== Isozymes ==
In humans, there are two 11β-HSD isozymes:

Enzyme	Gene	Cofactor Dependence	Expression	Reactions catalyzed
HSD-11β Type 1	HSD11B1	NADPH-dependent	Highly expressed in key metabolic tissues including liver, adipose tissue, and the central nervous system.	Reduces cortisone to cortisol.
HSD-11β Type 2	HSD11B2	NAD^{+}-dependent	Expressed in aldosterone-selective tissues, including kidneys, liver, lungs, colon, salivary glands, HSD2 neurons and placenta.	Oxidizes cortisol to cortisone.

== Clinical application ==
HSD-11βs are enzymes involved in steroid hormone physiology. HSD-11β Type 1 is found in metabolic tissues targeted by glucocorticoids and converts cortisone to active cortisol. HSD-11β Type 1 acts as a reductase producing active cortisol and the amplification of glucocorticoids. This enzyme is most abundant in the liver but can be found in most tissues in the body. HSD11B- Type 1 amplifies glucocorticoid concentrations in the liver and adipose tissue, glucocorticoid excess induces obesity with other features such as hypertension and diabetes mellitus.

HSD-11β Type 2 is expressed by aldosterone-selective tissues and protects the mineralocorticoid receptor from activation by cortisol by converting it to cortisone using the enzyme 11-oxoreductase. HSD-11β Type 2 protects tissues from continuous activation by decreasing local cortisol levels and preventing 11-oxoreductase from activating. In tissues that do not express the mineralocorticoid receptor, such as the placenta and testis, it protects cells from the growth-inhibiting and/or pro-apoptotic effects of cortisol, particularly during embryonic development. Mutations in this gene cause the syndrome of apparent mineralocorticoid excess and hypertension.

Since the main functions of HSD-11βs are for the regulation of glucocorticoids, the two isozymes are linked to various overstimulation or depletion of glucocorticosteroids that result in chemical imbalances in the human body. The effects of the enzyme as it relates to specific body functions and its associated disorders are listed below.

Effect of Hyperlipidemia on 11β-hydroxysteroid-dehydrogenase

Hyperlipidemia has a great effect on 11β-hydroxysteroid-dehydrogenase. Glucocorticoid is dependent on glucocorticoid plasma concentration, cellular glucocorticoid receptor expression and the pre-receptor hormone metabolism that is catalyzed by 11β-HSD. There are two types of 11β-Hydroxysteroid dehydrogenases that control cortisol concentration: HSD-11β Type 1 and HSD-11β Type 2. HSD-11β Type 1 is responsible for converting cortisone to cortisol by acting as an oxo-reductase because it is NADP(H) dependent, while HSD-11β Type 2 inactivates cortisol to cortisone via NAD. 10-d hyperlipidemia increases the HSD-11β Type 1 expression in visceral and subcutaneous adipose tissues. Hyperlipidemia decreases HSD-11β Type 2 expression in the liver and adipose tissue. Hyperlipidemia has a great influence on HSD-11β Type 1 and HSD-11β Type 2. This demonstrates that there is likely a relationship between hyperlipidemia and cortisol metabolism. Cushing's Disease, synonymous with hypercortisolism, involves overwhelming the cortisol-neutralizing ability of 11β-HSD2 with high concentrations of cortisol. This allows cortisol to outcompete aldosterone and bind to mineralocorticoid receptors, resulting in the activation of several pathways that increase blood pressure.

=== Activity of HSD-11βs in organs ===
HSD-11βs are active in organs and in the adrenal gland. The two isoenzymes take on various duties. During an active state, HSD-11β promotes the increase in glucocorticoids in the hepatocytes and also enhances gluconeogenesis. The type 2 isozyme converts active glucocorticoid hormones to inactive metabolites in target tissues such as kidney, salivary glands, intestines, etc. The activation of the two isozymes of HSD-11β in the kidneys and liver triggers the extra-adrenal formation in alloxan diabetes, which affiliates with the reduction in the synthesis of glucocorticoid hormones in the adrenal glands. The extra-adrenal formation leads to the increased local formation of corticosterone in the liver and has a high activity of reactions with gluconeogenesis. These gluconeogenesis reactions add to the continued metabolic disorders similar to that of diabetes. Thus, inhibitors of HSD-11β Type 1 are potential treatment agents for diabetes mellitus, obesity, and metabolic syndrome by decreasing production of active glucocorticoids.

==== Involvement in the brain ====
HSD-11βs are expressed in the central nervous system of aged individuals. It is essential in Hypothalamo-Pituitary-Adrenal Axis function. HSD-11βs also partakes involvement in the decline of conscious intellectual activity due to aging. The enzyme also contributes to central effects are also during the development stages. For instance, the HSD-11βs Type 2 shows frequently in fetal tissues such as a newborn's brain and placenta. If there is an absence or decline in HSD-11βs Type 2 in the fetus tissues, there are negative developmental consequences such as anxiety.

HSD-11βs are partly responsible for intracellular metabolism that determine the operation of glucocorticoids within cells. Glucocorticoids impact the brain development and ultimately the function of the central nervous system. So much so, that if there is a surplus or scant amounts of it, the consequences are deformities throughout one's entire life. HSD-11β Type 1 is responsible for activating glucocorticoids while HSD-11β Type 2 is responsible for deactivating them. The consequences for HSD-11β Type 1 activating glucocorticoids is that there is a decline in cognition especially as one ages. Contrarily, the effects of HSD-11β Type 2 occur during development. Some consequences of a high expression HSD-11β Type 2 are anxiety and cardiometabolic disorders, both of which are part of the early age glucocorticoid programming.

=== Preterm birth ===
Infants born underweight are susceptible to having metabolic disease throughout their lives. The presence of glucocorticoids has contributed to the relatively low infant birth weight. A decrease in HSD-11β Type 2 in the placenta can lead to infant restriction in growth, specifically during the first 12 months of an infant's life. The reason for this is because the HSD-11β Type 2 is meant to be expressed in high quantities in the placenta, This is so because the enzymes secure the fetus from exposure to increased levels of glucocorticoids, which are linked to underweight newborns.

== See also ==
- Steroidogenic enzyme
- 11β-Hydroxysteroid dehydrogenase type 1
- 11β-Hydroxysteroid dehydrogenase type 2
- Cortisone reductase deficiency
