= 11α-Hydroxyprogesterone =

Chemical compound

Clinical data
- Other names: 11α-OHP; 11α-Hydroxypregn-4-ene-3,20-dione; 4-Pregnen-11α-ol-3,20-dione; δ^{4}-Pregnen-11α-ol-3,20-dione

Identifiers
- IUPAC name: (8S,9S,10R,11R,13S,14S,17S)-17-acetyl-11-hydroxy-10,13-dimethyl-1,2,6,7,8,9,11,12,14,15,16,17-dodecahydrocyclopenta[a]phenanthren-3-one
- CAS Number: 80-75-1
- PubChem CID: 92730
- ChemSpider: 83709
- UNII: D8X4JXL4VM
- ChEBI: CHEBI:16076
- ChEMBL: ChEMBL1563246
- CompTox Dashboard (EPA): DTXSID10861644
- ECHA InfoCard: 100.001.189

Chemical and physical data
- Formula: C_{21}H_{30}O_{3}
- Molar mass: 330.468 g·mol^{−1}
- 3D model (JSmol): Interactive image
- SMILES: CC(=O)C1CCC2C1(CC(C3C2CCC4=CC(=O)CCC34C)O)C
- InChI: InChI=1S/C21H30O3/c1-12(22)16-6-7-17-15-5-4-13-10-14(23)8-9-20(13,2)19(15)18(24)11-21(16,17)3/h10,15-19,24H,4-9,11H2,1-3H3/t15-,16+,17-,18+,19+,20-,21+/m0/s1; Key:BFZHCUBIASXHPK-QJSKAATBSA-N

11α-Hydroxyprogesterone (11α-OHP), or 11α-hydroxypregn-4-ene-3,20-dione is an endogenous steroid and metabolite of progesterone. It is a weak antiandrogen, and is devoid of androgenic, estrogenic, and progestogenic activity.

11α-OHP was investigated as a topical antiandrogen for the treatment of androgen-dependent skin conditions in the early 1950s, and was found to produce some benefit. In 1995, 11α-OHP, along with its epimer 11β-hydroxyprogesterone, was identified as a very potent competitive inhibitor of both isoforms (1 and 2) of 11β-hydroxysteroid dehydrogenase (11β-HSD). It is notably not metabolized by 11β-HSD2.

11α-OHP is a more potent inhibitor of 11β-HSD than enoxolone (glycyrrhetinic acid) or carbenoxolone in vitro (IC_{50} = 0.9 nM; IC_{50} = 5 nM in transfected cells). The compound has been found to be highly active in conferring mineralocorticoid sodium-retaining activity of corticosterone in vivo in rat bioassays and in increasing blood pressure, effects that it mediates by preventing the 11β-HSD-mediated inactivation of endogenous corticosteroids.

11α-OHP is used as a precursor in chemical syntheses of cortisone and hydrocortisone.

== See also ==
- Steroidal antiandrogen
- List of steroidal antiandrogens
- Glycyrrhizin
