= 11β-Hydroxysteroid dehydrogenase type 1 =

Mammalian protein found in humans

HSD11B1
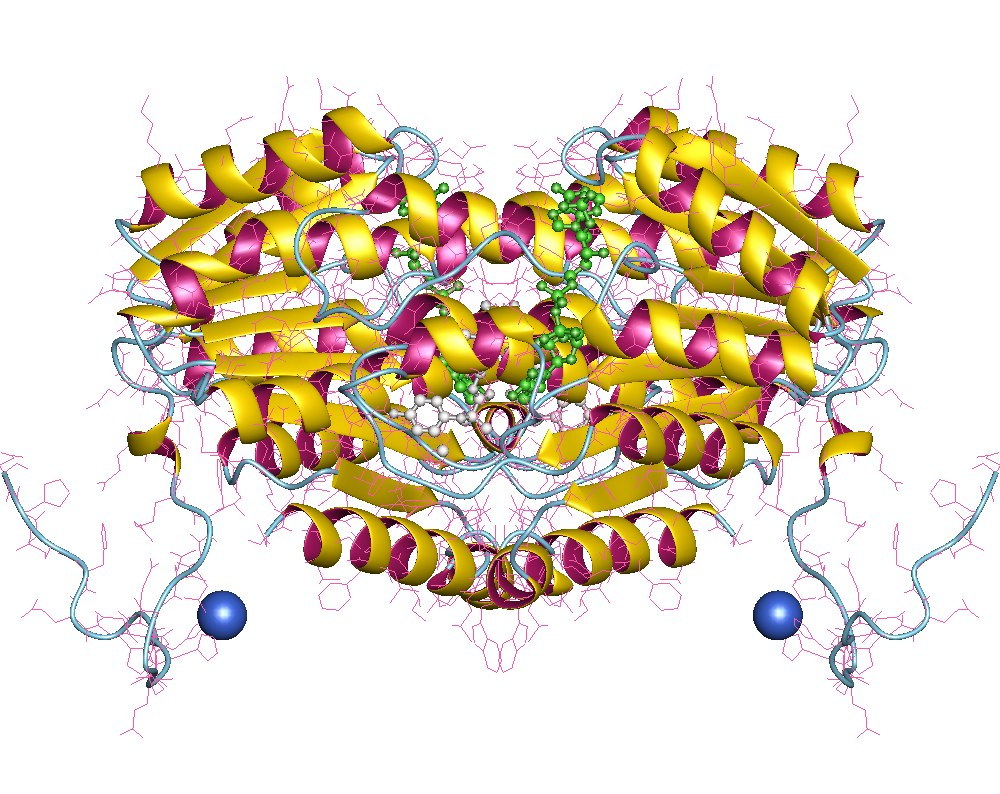

Identifiers
- Aliases: HSD11B1, 11-DH, 11-beta-HSD1, CORTRD2, HDL, HSD11, HSD11B, HSD11L, SDR26C1, hydroxysteroid (11-beta) dehydrogenase 1, hydroxysteroid 11-beta dehydrogenase 1
- External IDs: OMIM: 600713; MGI: 103562; GeneCards: HSD11B1
Available structures
PDB	Ortholog search: PDBe RCSB
PDB	List of PDB id codes 4P38, 1XU9, 2BEL, 2ILT, 2IRW, 2RBE, 3BYZ, 3BZU, 3CH6, 3CZR, 3D3E, 3D4N, 3D5Q, 3EY4, 3FCO, 3FRJ, 3H6K, 3HFG, 3OQ1, 3PDJ, 3QQP, 3TFQ, 4BB5, 4BB6, 4C7J, 4C7K, 4HFR, 4HX5, 4IJU, 4IJV, 4IJW, 4K1L, 4YYZ, 1XU7
Enzyme activity
EC #	BRENDA	ExPASy	KEGG	MetaCyc
1.1.1.146	↗	↗	↗	↗
1.1.1.201	↗	↗	↗	↗

Gene location (Human)
Chr.	Chromosome 1 (human)
Band	1q32.2	Start	209,686,178 bp
Band	1q32.2	End	209,734,949 bp

Gene location (Mouse)
Chr.	Chromosome 1 (mouse)
Band	1|1 H6	Start	192,903,942 bp
Band	1|1 H6	End	192,946,383 bp
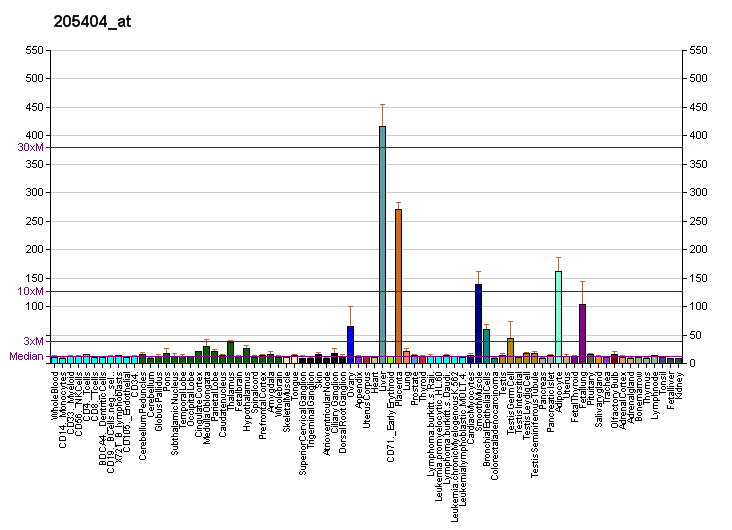
RNA expression pattern
Bgee	Human / Mouse (ortholog); Top expressed in: decidua; right lobe of liver; islet of Langerhans; skin of thigh; right ovary; left ovary; urethra; right lung; stromal cell of endometrium; upper lobe of left lung / Top expressed in: left lobe of liver; right lung lobe; left lung; umbilical cord; gastrula; decidua; left lung lobe; right kidney; granulocyte; white adipose tissue; More reference expression data
BioGPS	More reference expression data
Gene ontology
Molecular function	11-beta-hydroxysteroid dehydrogenase (NADP+) activity; oxidoreductase activity; 11-beta-hydroxysteroid dehydrogenase [NAD(P) activity]; steroid binding
Cellular component	integral component of membrane; endoplasmic reticulum membrane; endoplasmic reticulum; membrane
Biological process	glucocorticoid biosynthetic process; lung development; lipid metabolism; steroid metabolic process
Sources:Amigo / QuickGO
Orthologs
Databases	NCBI: entry; OMA: entry
Species	Human	Mouse
Entrez	3290	15483
Ensembl	ENSG00000117594	ENSMUSG00000016194
UniProt	P28845	P50172
RefSeq (mRNA)	NM_181755; NM_001206741; NM_005525	NM_001044751; NM_008288
RefSeq (protein)	NP_001193670; NP_005516; NP_861420; NP_001193670.1; NP_005516.1 NP_861420.1	NP_001038216; NP_032314
Location (UCSC)	Chr 1: 209.69 – 209.73 Mb	Chr 1: 192.9 – 192.95 Mb
PubMed search
- Wikidata
View/Edit Human	View/Edit Mouse

11β-Hydroxysteroid dehydrogenase type 1, also known as cortisone reductase, is an NADPH-dependent enzyme highly expressed in key metabolic tissues including liver, adipose tissue, and the central nervous system. In these tissues, HSD11B1 reduces cortisone to the active hormone cortisol that activates glucocorticoid receptors. It belongs to the family of short-chain dehydrogenases. It is encoded by the HSD11B1 gene.

== Function ==
The protein encoded by this gene is a microsomal enzyme that catalyzes the conversion of the stress hormone cortisol to the inactive metabolite cortisone. In addition, the encoded protein can catalyze the reverse reaction, the conversion of cortisone to cortisol. Too much cortisol can lead to central obesity, and a particular variation in this gene has been associated with obesity and insulin resistance in children. Two transcript variants encoding the same protein have been found for this gene.

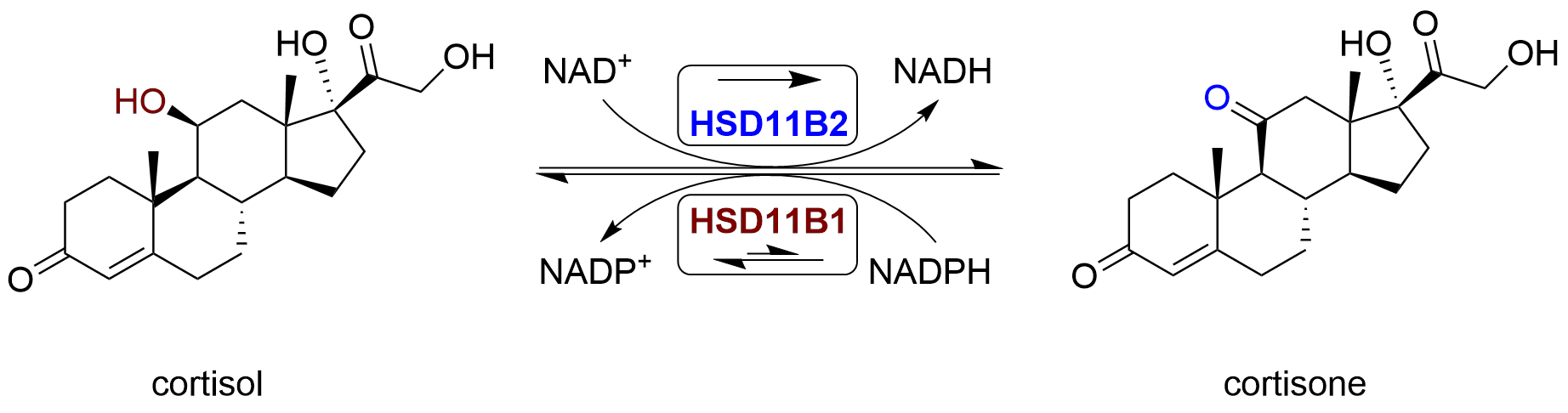
Cortisol-cortisone equilibrium

== Clinical significance ==
11β-HSD1 is inhibited by carbenoxolone, a drug typically used in the treatment of peptic ulcers. Moreover, 18alpha-glycyrrhizic acid from liquorice root was discovered as an inhibitor.

Salicylate downregulates 11β-HSD1 expression in adipose tissue in obese mice and hence may explain why aspirin improves glycemic control in type 2 diabetes. Epigallocatechin gallate from green tea can also potently inhibit this enzyme; green tea is a complex mixture of various phenolics with contents varying with production and processing, and some of the phenolics are known HDAC inhibitors that alter genetic expression. EGCG as usually consumed in green tea is poorly absorbed into the bloodstream. More research is needed to reach firm conclusions.

Emestedastat is a compound being developed as a potential treatment of Alzheimer's disease and depression that acts by inhibiting 11β-HSD1.

== See also ==
- Cortisone reductase deficiency
- 11β-hydroxysteroid dehydrogenase type 2
