= Acetoxolone =

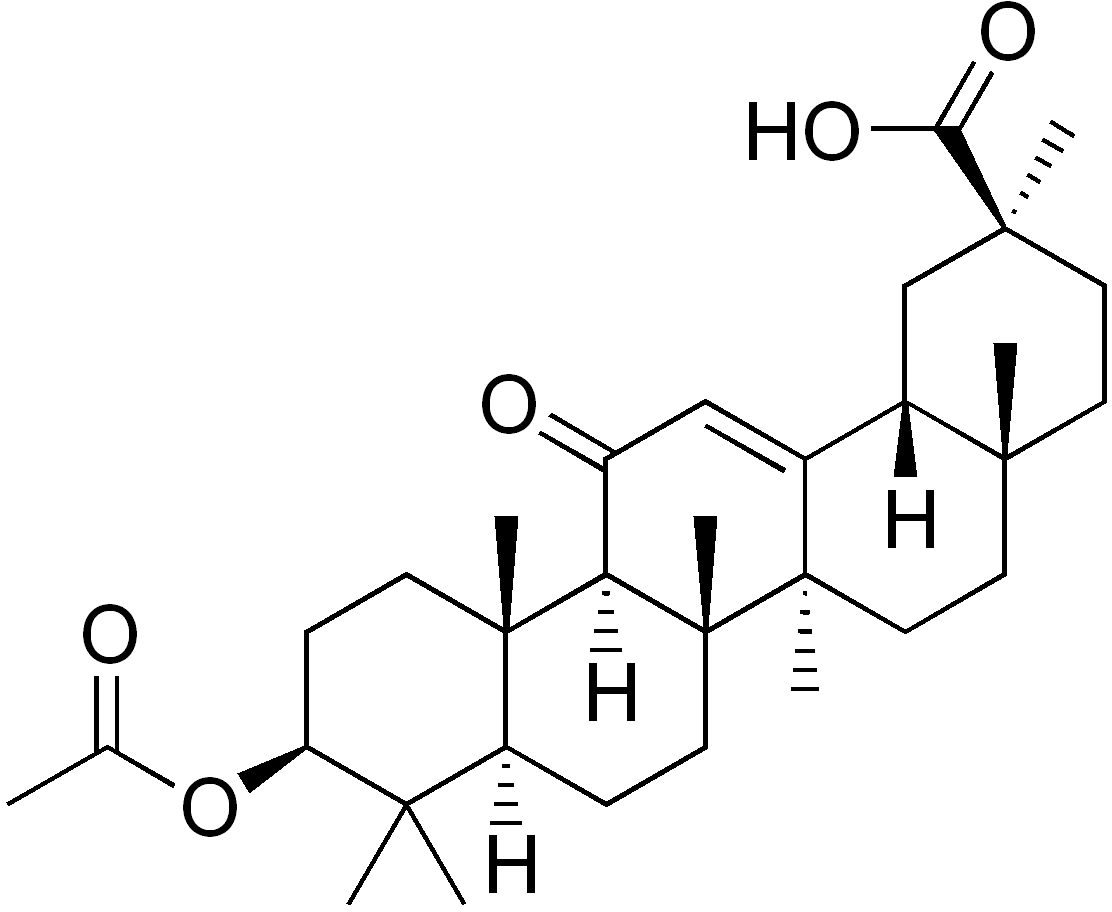

Names
- IUPAC name 3β-(Acetyloxy)-11-oxoolean-12-en-30-oic acid
- Systematic IUPAC name (2S,4aS,6aS,6bR,8aR,10S,12aS,12bR,14bR)-10-(Acetyloxy)-2,4a,6a,6b,9,9,12a-heptamethyl-13-oxo-1,2,3,4,4a,5,6,6a,6b,7,8,8a,9,10,11,12,12a,12b,13,14b-icosahydropicene-2-carboxylic acid
- Other names Acetylglycyrrhetinic acid

Identifiers
CAS Number	6277-14-1
3D model (JSmol)	Interactive image
ChEMBL	ChEMBL207413
ChemSpider	85123
ECHA InfoCard	100.025.887
PubChem CID	94320
UNII	CWW961Q19K
- InChI: InChI=1S/C32H48O5/c1-19(33)37-24-10-11-30(6)23(27(24,2)3)9-12-32(8)25(30)22(34)17-20-21-18-29(5,26(35)36)14-13-28(21,4)15-16-31(20,32)7/h17,21,23-25H,9-16,18H2,1-8H3,(H,35,36)/t21-,23-,24-,25+,28+,29-,30-,31+,32+/m0/s1 Key: FTQDJVZNPJRVPG-XWEVEMRCSA-N; InChI=1/C32H48O5/c1-19(33)37-24-10-11-30(6)23(27(24,2)3)9-12-32(8)25(30)22(34)17-20-21-18-29(5,26(35)36)14-13-28(21,4)15-16-31(20,32)7/h17,21,23-25H,9-16,18H2,1-8H3,(H,35,36)/t21-,23-,24-,25+,28+,29-,30-,31+,32+/m0/s1 Key: FTQDJVZNPJRVPG-XWEVEMRCBD
- SMILES: CC(=O)O[C@H]1CC[C@]2([C@H](C1(C)C)CC[C@@]3([C@@H]2C(=O)C=C4[C@]3(CC[C@@]5([C@H]4C[C@@](CC5)(C)C(=O)O)C)C)C)C

Properties
Chemical formula	C_{32}H_{48}O_{5}
Molar mass	512.72 g/mol

Pharmacology
ATC code	A02BX09 (WHO)
- Except where otherwise noted, data are given for materials in their standard state (at 25 °C [77 °F], 100 kPa). verify (what is ?) Infobox references

Acetoxolone (also known as acetylglycyrrhetic acid, acetylglycyrrhetinic acid, glycyrrhetinyl acetate and glycyrrhetic acid acetate) is a drug used for peptic ulcer and gastroesophageal reflux disease. It is an acetyl derivative of glycyrrhetinic acid. It is found in Echinopora lamellosa.

== See also ==
- Carbenoxolone
- Enoxolone
