= Erq sous =

Licorice root beverage consumed in Egypt and the Levant

Erq sous عرق سوس
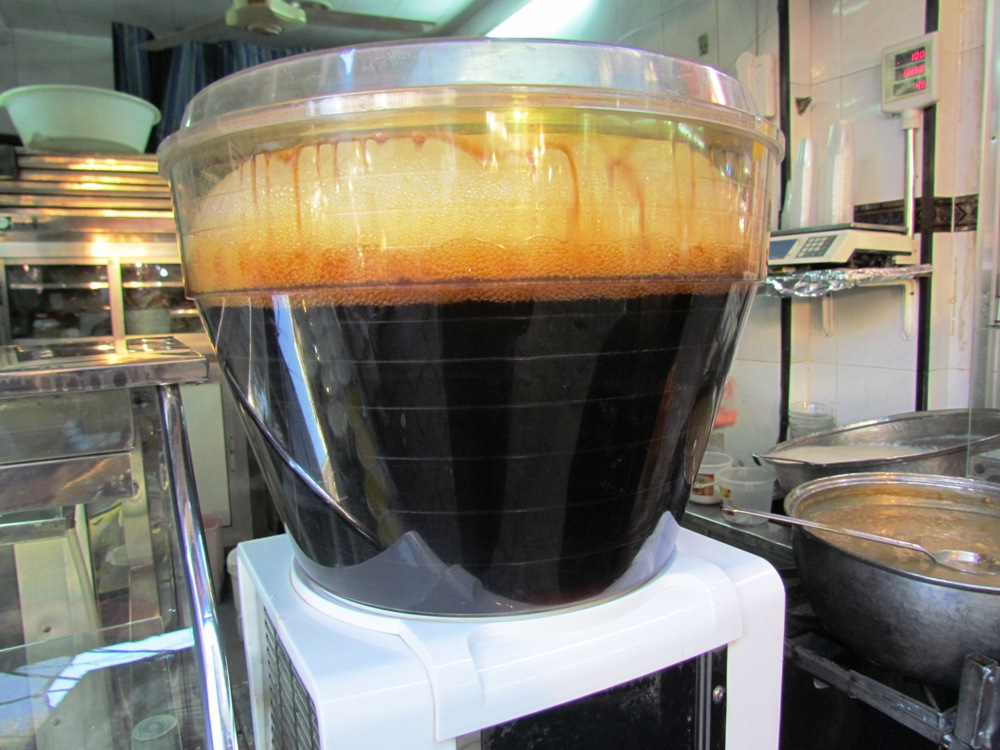
- Erq sous in Syria
- Origin: Egypt
- Colour: Dark brown
- Ingredients: Licorice root, water, sugar

Erq sous (Arabic: عرق سوس, ʿer' sous) is a traditional beverage made from licorice root consumed in Egypt and the countries of the Levant, renowned for its distinctive earthy and slightly sweet flavor. This refreshing drink is particularly popular during the holy month of Ramadan, as it is believed to help maintain hydration during fasting.

== History ==
Liquorice root has been used in Egypt for millennia, valued for its natural sweetness and purported cooling properties. The specific preparation of erq sous as a popular beverage likely evolved over time, influenced by different cultures, ultimately becoming an integral part of Egyptian culinary heritage.

The drink dates back to a time when liquorice extracts were valued for their thirst-quenching properties, it is believed that it was regularly consumed by Egyptian soldiers throughout history to hydrate.

Liquorice was also used medicinally in ancient civilisations such as Assyria, India, and China. However, the Egyptian preparation of erq sous sets it apart from other traditional uses of liquorice.

== Preparation ==
To prepare erq sous, dried licorice root is thoroughly rinsed and combined with baking soda in a bowl. A small amount of water is added to moisten the mixture, which is then left to sit for 6-8 hours or overnight to allow the flavors to develop. After soaking, the softened licorice root is placed in a saucepan with water and brought to a boil over medium heat. The mixture is then simmered for 20-30 minutes to infuse the water with the licorice essence. Afterward, the liquid is strained through a fine mesh sieve or cheesecloth to remove solids, cooled completely, and refrigerated until chilled. The chilled juice is served over ice.

Erq sous is not only appreciated for its unique taste but also for purported health benefits. Licorice root has been traditionally used for its soothing properties and is believed to aid in digestion. However, it is recommended to consume erq sous in moderation, as excessive intake can lead to side effects due to its potent active ingredient, glycyrrhizin.
