= Glabridin =

Names
- IUPAC name (3R)-6′′,6′′-Dimethyl-6′′H-pyrano[2′′,3′′:7,8]isoflavan-2′,4′-diol
- Systematic IUPAC name 4-[(3R)-8,8-Dimethyl-3,4-dihydro-2H,8H-(benzo[1,2-b:3,4-b′]dipyran)-3-yl]benzene-1,3-diol

Identifiers
CAS Number	59870-68-7
3D model (JSmol)	Interactive image
ChEBI	CHEBI:5369
ChEMBL	ChEMBL480477
ChemSpider	110560
ECHA InfoCard	100.126.141
PubChem CID	124052
UNII	HOC5567T41
CompTox Dashboard (EPA)	DTXSID00208589
- InChI: InChI=1S/C20H20O4/c1-20(2)8-7-16-18(24-20)6-3-12-9-13(11-23-19(12)16)15-5-4-14(21)10-17(15)22/h3-8,10,13,21-22H,9,11H2,1-2H3/t13-/m0/s1 Key: LBQIJVLKGVZRIW-ZDUSSCGKSA-N; InChI=1/C20H20O4/c1-20(2)8-7-16-18(24-20)6-3-12-9-13(11-23-19(12)16)15-5-4-14(21)10-17(15)22/h3-8,10,13,21-22H,9,11H2,1-2H3/t13-/m0/s1 Key: LBQIJVLKGVZRIW-ZDUSSCGKBA
- SMILES: O4c2c1\C=C/C(Oc1ccc2C[C@H](c3ccc(O)cc3O)C4)(C)C

Properties
Chemical formula	C_{20}H_{20}O_{4}
Molar mass	324.376 g·mol^{−1}
Appearance	Yellowish-brown powder
Melting point	238–240 °C (460–464 °F; 511–513 K)
- Except where otherwise noted, data are given for materials in their standard state (at 25 °C [77 °F], 100 kPa). verify (what is ?) Infobox references

Glabridin is a chemical compound that is found in the root extract of licorice (Glycyrrhiza glabra). Glabridin is an isoflavane, a type of isoflavonoid. This product is part of a larger family of plant-derived molecules, the natural phenols. Glabridin effectively inhibits platelet activation, so it might become therapeutic agent for thromboembolic disorders.

It is used as an ingredient in cosmetics and is listed in International Nomenclature of Cosmetic Ingredients (INCI).

Glabridin is yellowish-brown powder. It is insoluble in water, but soluble in organic solvents such as propylene glycol.

== See also ==
- Glabrene
- Isoliquiritigenin
- Liquiritigenin
