= Glabrene =

Names
- IUPAC name 6′′,6′′-Dimethyl-6′′H-pyrano[2′′,3′′:2′,3′]isoflav-3-ene-4′,7-diol
- Systematic IUPAC name 2′,2′-Dimethyl-2H,2′H-[3,8′-bi-1-benzopyran]-5′,7-diol
- Other names 2',2'-dimethyl-2H,2'H-3,8'-bichromene-5',7-diol

Identifiers
CAS Number	60008-03-9
3D model (JSmol)	Interactive image
ChEMBL	ChEMBL462722
ChemSpider	421858
PubChem CID	480774
UNII	C6Y321Q75O
CompTox Dashboard (EPA)	DTXSID90208715
- InChI: InChI=1S/C20H18O4/c1-20(2)8-7-16-17(22)6-5-15(19(16)24-20)13-9-12-3-4-14(21)10-18(12)23-11-13/h3-10,21-22H,11H2,1-2H3 Key: NGGYSPUAKQMTNP-UHFFFAOYSA-N
- SMILES: CC1(C=CC2=C(C=CC(=C2O1)C3=CC4=C(C=C(C=C4)O)OC3)O)C

Properties
Chemical formula	C_{20}H_{18}O_{4}
Molar mass	322.36 g/mol
- Except where otherwise noted, data are given for materials in their standard state (at 25 °C [77 °F], 100 kPa). Infobox references

Glabrene is an isoflavonoid that is found in Glycyrrhiza glabra (licorice). It has estrogenic activity, showing estrogenic effects on breast, vascular, and bone tissue, and hence is a phytoestrogen (IC_{50} for estrogen receptor binding = 1 μM). It has also been found to act as a tyrosinase inhibitor (IC_{50} = 3.5 μM) and to inhibit the formation of melanin in melanocytes, and for these reasons, has been suggested as a potential skin-lightening agent.

== See also ==
- Glabridin
- Isoliquiritigenin
- Liquiritigenin
