= Carbenoxolone =

Chemical compound

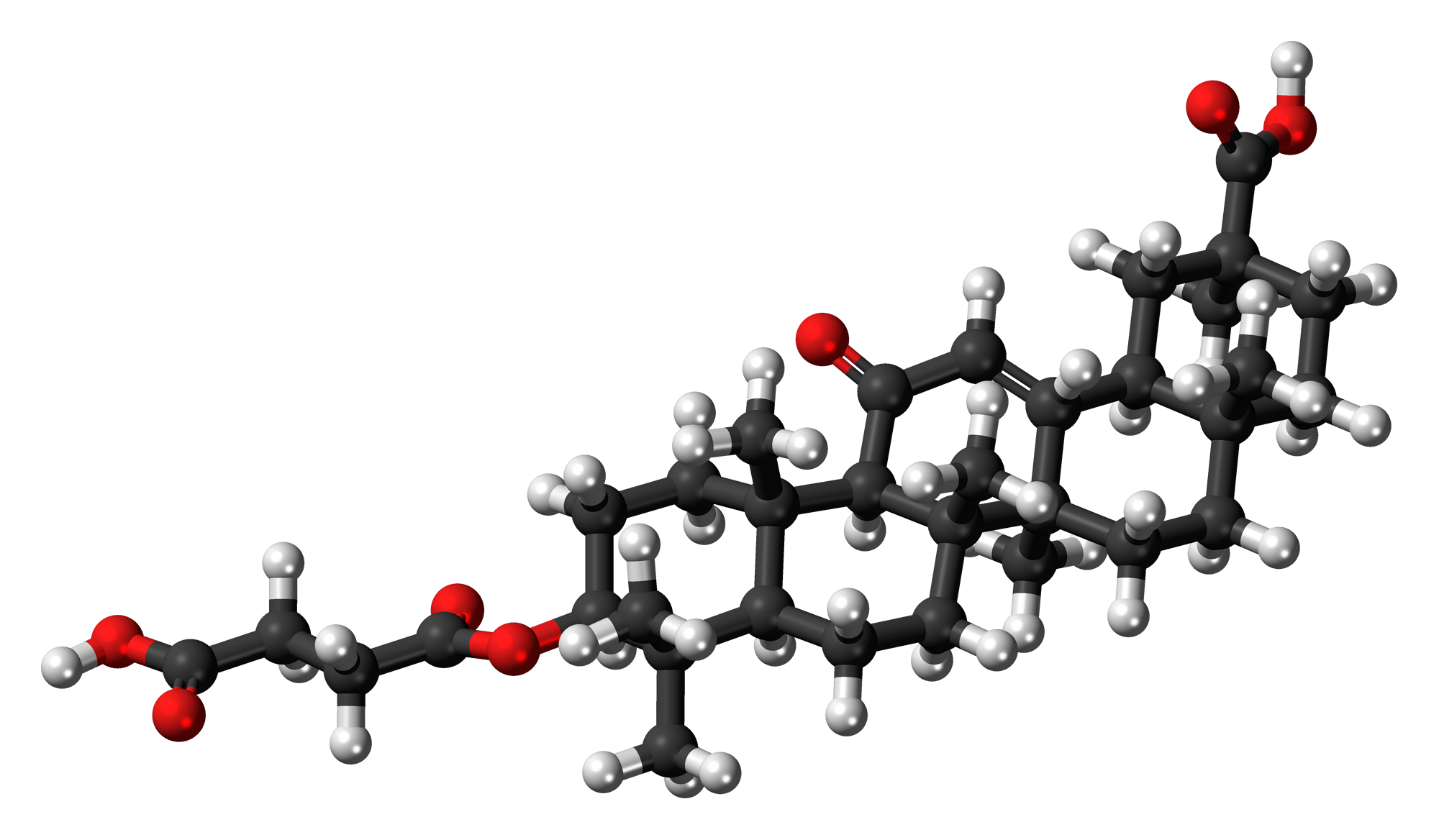

Clinical data
- Trade names: Biogastrone, others
- AHFS/Drugs.com: International Drug Names
- ATC code: A02BX01 (WHO)

Identifiers
- IUPAC name: (3β)-3-[(3-carboxypropanoyl)oxy]-11-oxoolean-12-en-30-oic acid OR (2S,4aS,6aS,6bR,8aR,10S,12aS,12bR,14bR)-10-(3-carboxypropanoyloxy)-2,4a,6a,6b,9,9,12a-heptamethyl-13-oxo-1,2,3,4,4a,5,6,6a,6b,7,8,8a,9,10,11,12,12a,12b,13,14b-icosahydropicene-2-carboxylic acid
- CAS Number: 5697-56-3
- PubChem CID: 636403
- IUPHAR/BPS: 4151
- DrugBank: DB02329
- ChemSpider: 552190
- UNII: MM6384NG73
- ChEMBL: ChEMBL499915
- CompTox Dashboard (EPA): DTXSID4022733
- ECHA InfoCard: 100.024.704

Chemical and physical data
- Formula: C_{34}H_{50}O_{7}
- Molar mass: 570.767 g·mol^{−1}
- 3D model (JSmol): Interactive image
- SMILES: O=C(O)CCC(=O)O[C@H]4CC[C@@]3([C@H]5C(=O)/C=C2/[C@@H]1C[C@](C(=O)O)(C)CC[C@]1(C)CC[C@]2([C@@]5(CC[C@H]3C4(C)C)C)C)C
- InChI: InChI=1S/C34H50O7/c1-29(2)23-10-13-34(7)27(32(23,5)12-11-24(29)41-26(38)9-8-25(36)37)22(35)18-20-21-19-31(4,28(39)40)15-14-30(21,3)16-17-33(20,34)6/h18,21,23-24,27H,8-17,19H2,1-7H3,(H,36,37)(H,39,40)/t21-,23-,24-,27+,30+,31-,32-,33+,34+/m0/s1; Key:OBZHEBDUNPOCJG-WBXJDKIVSA-N

Carbenoxolone (CBX) is a glycyrrhetinic acid derivative with a steroid-like structure, similar to substances found in the root of the licorice plant. Carbenoxolone is used for the treatment of peptic, esophageal and oral ulceration and inflammation. Electrolyte imbalance is a serious side effect of carbenoxolone when used systemically.

Carbenoxolone reversibly inhibits the conversion of inactive cortisone to cortisol by blocking 11β-hydroxysteroid dehydrogenase (11β-HSD). 11β-HSD also reversibly catalyzes the conversion of 7-ketocholesterol to 7-beta-hydroxycholesterol.

Carbenoxolone is a modestly potent, reasonably effective, water-soluble blocker of gap junctions.

Carbenoxolone has also been used in topical creams such as Carbosan gel, marketed for treatment of lip sores and mouth ulcers.

== Nootropic effects ==
Carbenoxolone has also been investigated for nootropic effects. This research started from an observation that long-term exposure to glucocorticoids may have negative effects on cognition. Carbenoxolone may decrease the amount of active glucocorticoid in the brain, because the drug inhibits 11β-HSD, an enzyme which regenerates cortisol, an active glucocorticoid, from inactive cortisone.

In the research trial investigating this use of carbenoloxone, it was shown that the drug improved verbal fluency in elderly healthy men (aged 55–75). In type 2 diabetics aged 52–70, the drug improved verbal memory. However, potassium-sparing diuretic amiloride was co-administered with carbenoxolone, since carbenoxolone used by itself may cause hypertension by increasing cortisol in the kidneys.

== See also ==
- 11α-Hydroxyprogesterone
