= Emestedastat =

Cortisol synthesis inhibitor

Clinical data
- Other names: Xanamem; UE-2343; UE2343
- Routes of administration: Oral
- Drug class: 11β-Hydroxysteroid dehydrogenase type 1 inhibitor

Identifiers
- IUPAC name: [(1R,5S)-3-hydroxy-3-pyrimidin-2-yl-8-azabicyclo[3.2.1]octan-8-yl]-[5-(1H-pyrazol-4-yl)thiophen-3-yl]methanone
- CAS Number: 1346013-80-6
- PubChem CID: 137530063
- ChemSpider: 129307035
- UNII: 106ELK29GH
- KEGG: D13200

Chemical and physical data
- Formula: C_{19}H_{19}N_{5}O_{2}S
- Molar mass: 381.45 g·mol^{−1}
- 3D model (JSmol): Interactive image
- SMILES: C1C[C@H]2CC(C[C@@H]1N2C(=O)C3=CSC(=C3)C4=CNN=C4)(C5=NC=CC=N5)O
- InChI: InChI=1S/C19H19N5O2S/c25-17(12-6-16(27-11-12)13-9-22-23-10-13)24-14-2-3-15(24)8-19(26,7-14)18-20-4-1-5-21-18/h1,4-6,9-11,14-15,26H,2-3,7-8H2,(H,22,23)/t14-,15+,19?; Key:MMZFGTAMARVHAF-RTHVDDQRSA-N

Emestedastat (proposed brand name Xanamem; developmental code name UE-2343) is a steroidogenesis inhibitor which is under development for the treatment of Alzheimer's disease, major depressive disorder, and fragile X syndrome. It is taken orally.

The drug specifically acts as a centrally penetrant inhibitor of 11β-hydroxysteroid dehydrogenase type 1 (11β-HSD1) and thereby inhibits the synthesis of the glucocorticoid steroid hormone cortisol.

Emestedastat was originated by the University of Edinburgh and is under development by Actinogen Medical. As of June 2026, it is in phase 2/3 clinical trials for Alzheimer's disease and phase 2 trials for major depressive disorder, whereas no recent development has been reported for fragile X syndrome.

Clinical effectiveness for Alzheimer's disease has been mixed. In a phase 2 clinical trial for major depressive disorder published in July 2026, emestedastat showed no significant benefit on depressive or cognitive symptoms. In addition, it produced mild-to-moderate transaminase elevations in 10% of people, whereas this occurred in 1% in the placebo group.

== See also ==
- List of investigational antidepressants
