= Cortisone reductase deficiency =

- Other names: HSD 11b1 deficiency
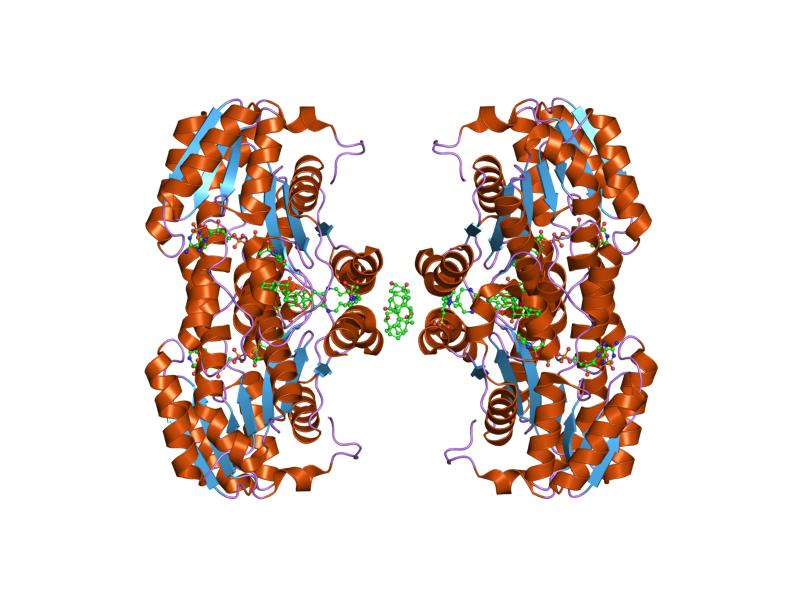
- 11β-hydroxysteroid dehydrogenase type 1
- Specialty: Medical genetics

Cortisone reductase deficiency is caused by dysregulation of the 11β-hydroxysteroid dehydrogenase type 1 enzyme (11β-HSD1), otherwise known as cortisone reductase, a bi-directional enzyme, which catalyzes the interconversion of cortisone to cortisol in the presence of NADH as a co-factor. If levels of NADH are low, the enzyme catalyses the reverse reaction, from cortisol to cortisone, using NAD+ as a co-factor.
Cortisol is a glucocorticoid that plays a variety of roles in many different biochemical pathways, including, but not limited to: gluconeogenesis, suppressing immune system responses and carbohydrate metabolism.
One of the symptoms of cortisone reductase deficiency is hyperandrogenism, resulting from activation of the Hypothalamic–pituitary–adrenal axis. The deficiency has been known to exhibit symptoms of other disorders such as polyendocrine metabolic ovarian syndrome (PMOS) in women. Cortisone Reductase Deficiency alone has been reported in fewer than ten cases in total, all but one case were women. Elevated activity of 11β-HSD1 can lead to obesity or Type II Diabetes, because of the role of cortisol in carbohydrate metabolism and gluconeogenesis.

== Signs and symptoms ==
Cortisol inhibition, and as a result, excess androgen release can lead to a variety of symptoms. Other symptoms come about as a result of increased levels of circulating androgen. Androgen is a steroid hormone, generally associated with development of male sex organs and secondary male sex characteristics The symptoms associated with Cortisone Reductase Deficiency are often linked with polyendocrine metabolic ovarian syndrome (PMOS) in females. The symptoms of PMOS include excessive hair growth, oligomenorrhea, amenorrhea, and infertility. In men, cortisone reductase deficiency results in premature pseudopuberty, or sexual development before the age of nine.

== Genetics ==
Inactivating mutations in the H6PD gene lead to a lowered supply of NADH, causing cortisone reductase to catalyze the reaction from cortisol to cortisone. This is the most common manifestation of CRD. It has been shown that CRD can be caused by mutations in the HSD11B1 gene as well, specifically mutations caused by K187N and R137C, affecting active site residue and disruption of salt bridges at the subunit interface of the dimer, respectively. In the K187N mutant, activity is abolished, and in the R137C mutant activity is greatly reduced, but not completely abolished.

== Pathophysiology ==
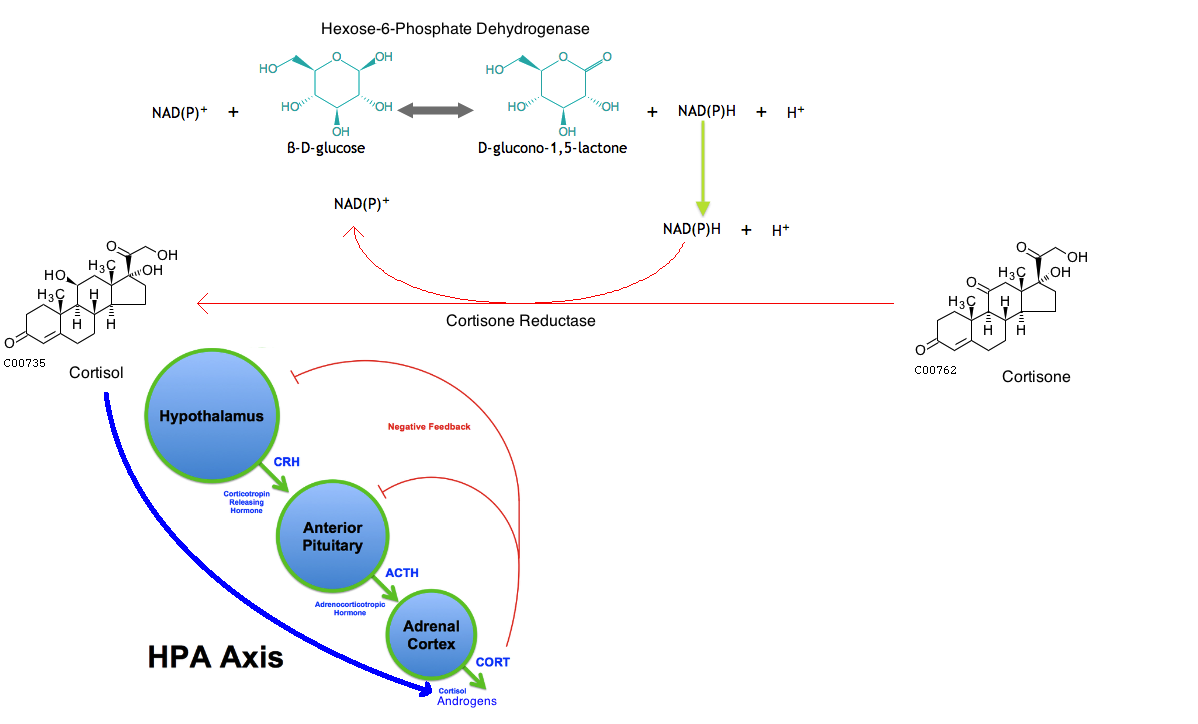
An overview of how cortisone reductase is driven by NADH production by hexose-6-phosphate and how it affects the HPA Axis in a healthy body.

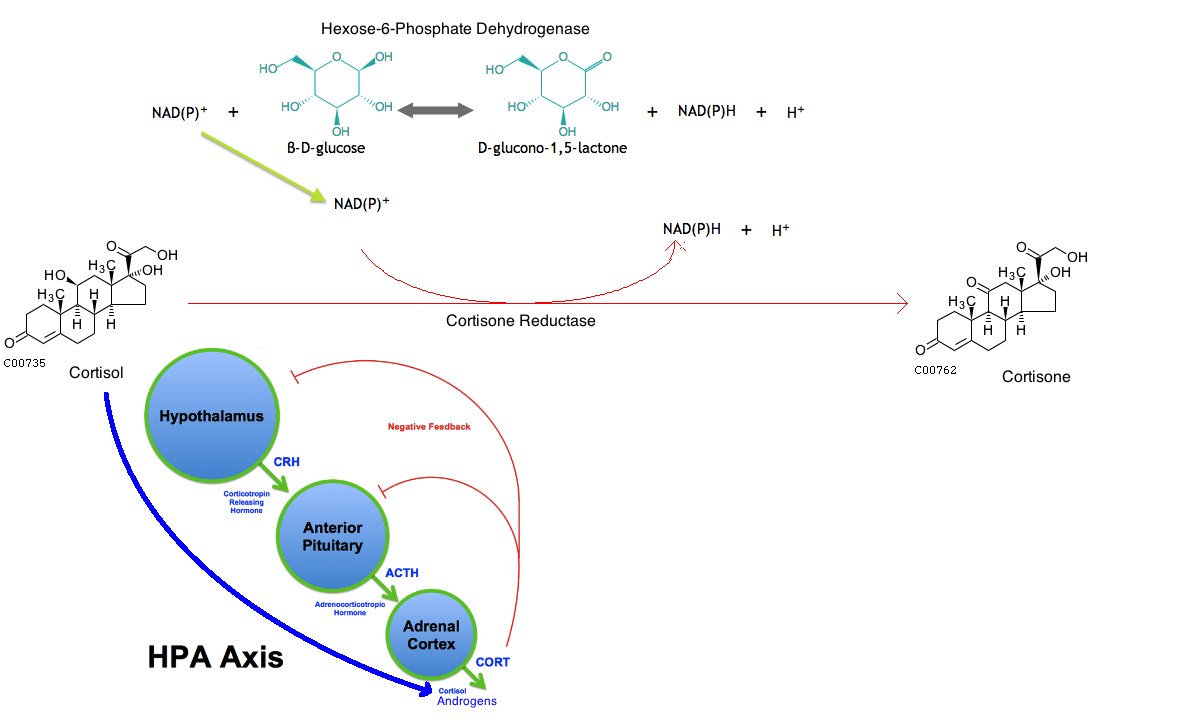
Cortisone Reductase Deficiency effects on HPA and body in presence of deficient H6PD

In a healthy body, blood cortisone and cortisol levels are roughly equimolar. Cortisone reductase deficiency leads to an elevated level of inert cortisone to active cortisol in adipose tissue. Cortisone reductase deficiency is caused by dysregulation of the 11β-hydroxysteroid dehydrogenase type 1 enzyme, otherwise known as cortisone reductase. The 11β-HSD1 enzyme is responsible for catalyzing the interconversion of circulating cortisone to cortisol, using NADH as a co-factor. The oxidative or reductive capacity of the enzyme is regulated by NADH produced by hexose-6-phosphate dehydrogenase (H6PD). H6PD is distinct from its isozyme, glucose-6-phosphate dehydrogenase (G6PDH) in that G6PDH is a cytolytic enzyme and draws from a separate pool of NAD+. H6PD is also capable of catalyzing the oxidation of several phosphorylated hexoses, while G6PDH shows affinity for glucose, specifically. The enzyme cortisone reductase exists in a tightly controlled reaction space, facing the lumen of the endoplasmic reticulum of cells in the liver and lungs. NADH produced by hexose-6-phosphate is delivered directly to the catalytic site of cortisone reductase. If NADH production is limited, then cortisone reductase is also capable of catalysing the reverse reaction taking circulating cortisol and reducing it to cortisone. Dysregulation of hexose-6-phosphate dehydrogenase occurs as a result of gene mutation. Cortisol is important in signalling inhibition of adrenocorticotropic hormone release from the pituitary. Reduced cortisol in circulation activates the H-P-A Axis to produce and release more cortisol, and therefore androgen.

=== Effect on HPA Axis ===
The Hypothalamic-Pituitary-Adrenal axis relies on blood levels of cortisol to act as negative feedback. Low levels of blood cortisol leads to release of Corticotrope Releasing Hormone (CRH) activating the anterior pituitary and signalling the release of Adrenocorticotropic Hormone (ACTH), stimulating the adrenal gland to make more cortisol. In addition to cortisol, the adrenal gland also releases androgen, leading to hyperandrogenism, which gives rise to the symptoms commonly associated with Cortisone Reductase Deficiency.

== Diagnosis ==
Diagnosis of cortisone reductase deficiency is done through analysis of cortisol to cortisone metabolite levels in blood samples.

== Treatment ==
There is no treatment for cortisone reductase deficiency. Shots of cortisol are quickly metabolised into cortisone by the dysregulated 11β-HSD1 enzyme; however, symptoms can be treated. Treatment of hyperandrogenism can be done through prescription of antiandrogens. They do so by inhibiting the release of gonadotropin and luteinizing hormone, both hormones in the pituitary, responsible for the production of testosterone.
