= Pre-locus coeruleus =

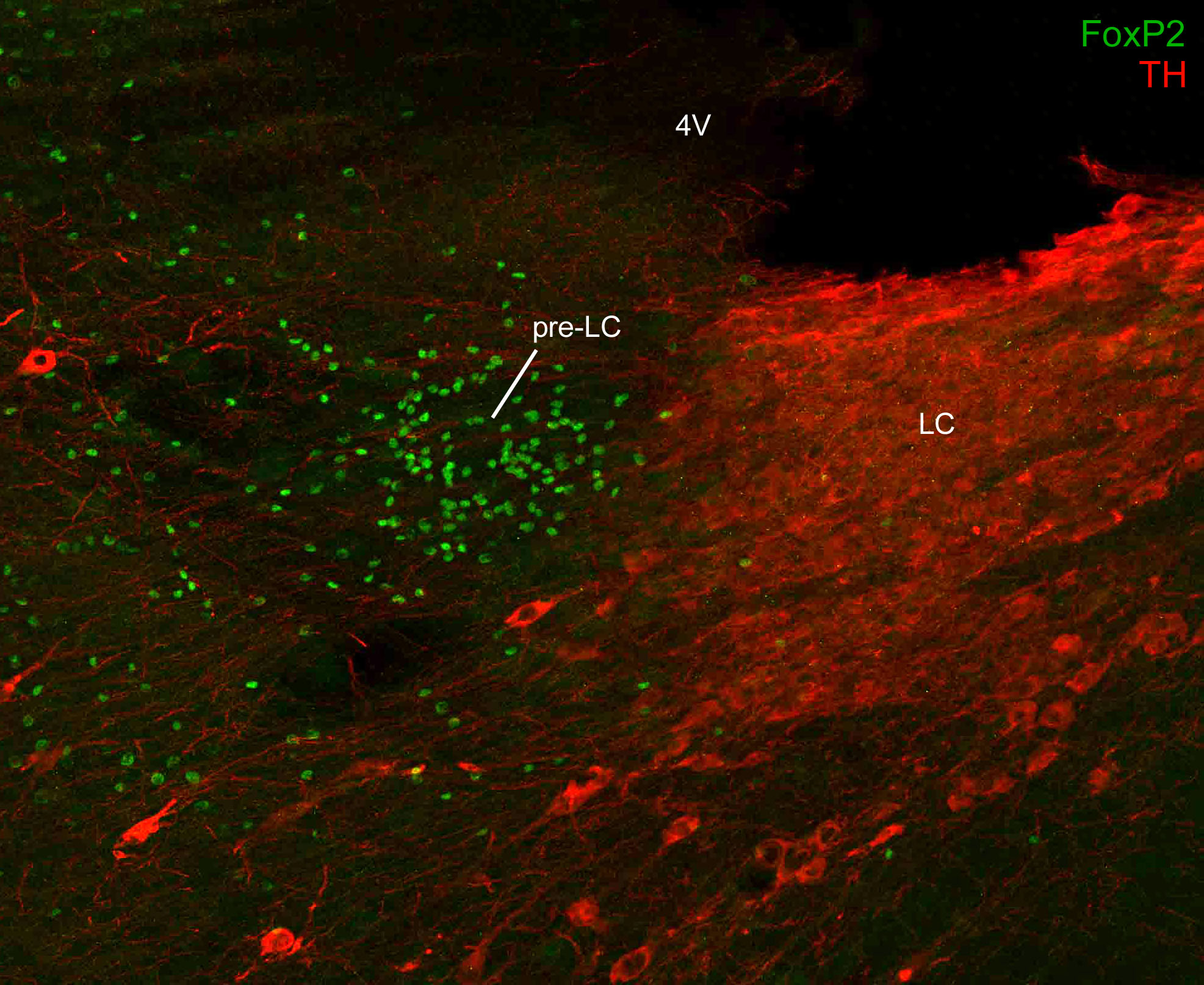
Sagittal section from rat dorsolateral pons showing the spatial relationship between the pre-locus coeruleus (pre-LC) and locus coeruleus (LC). Pre-LC neurons' nuclei are labeled in green (FoxP2), and lie rostral to (in front of) the LC neurons, which are labeled in red (tyrosine hydroxylase, abbreviated TH). The fourth ventricle is labeled "4V".

Pre-locus coeruleus is a small nucleus in the brainstem. This small cluster of neurons also is referred to by the abbreviation "pre-LC". It was named "pre-LC" because it lies just rostral to (in front of) the locus coeruleus, which is commonly abbreviated "LC".

== Definition ==
The pre-locus coeruleus was first formally defined during the course of neuroanatomical tract-tracing and c-Fos experiments aimed at uncovering the connections and functions of aldosterone-sensitive HSD2 neurons in the nucleus of the solitary tract. First, HSD2 neurons were found to innervate the pre-LC, as evidenced by (1) dense labeling with an anterograde axonal tracer in pre-LC after that tracer had been injected into the nucleus of the solitary tract and (2) the complementary finding of retrograde labeling of HSD2 neurons after injection of a retrograde tracer into the pre-LC. Further, experimental conditions which activate the HSD2 neurons simultaneously activate a cluster of neurons in pre-LC, in the same location as axon terminals labeled with an anterograde tracer from the NTS.

Based on these observations, the pre-locus coeruleus ("pre-LC") was defined as the cluster of neurons which:

1. are found in a specific location rostral to the LC (see "Location," below),
2. receive axonal input from HSD2 neurons in the NTS, and
3. become c-Fos positive during dietary sodium deprivation.

These features consistently and reliably identify a very specific subset of neurons in the dorsolateral pons, named the pre-locus coeruleus, or "pre-LC." Some investigators have used other terms including "precoeruleus," "peri5Me," and "pericoeruleus" to refer less specifically to regions of the brainstem anterior to the LC, but the term pre-LC very specifically refers to the group of neurons as defined above. Subsequently, it was discovered that every c-Fos-positive neuron in the pre-LC (after sodium deprivation) also expresses the transcription factor FOXP2. Given that sodium deprivation is a time-consuming experimental manipulation, and that FoxP2 is stably expressed without any experimental manipulation, this transcription factor can serve as a useful surrogate marker for labeling pre-LC neurons. However, FoxP2 expression is found in several nearby brain regions (not including the locus coeruleus, mesencephalic nucleus of the trigeminal, or laterodorsal tegmental nucleus), so it is not unique to the pre-LC. That is, every pre-LC neuron expresses FoxP2, but not every neuron that expresses FoxP2 is part of the pre-LC.

== Location ==
The name "pre-LC," as coined by Geerling and colleagues to refer to a very specific and molecularly defined cluster of neurons, refers specifically to neurons that lie medial to and intermingled with the mesencephalic nucleus of the trigeminal nerve and its tract at levels of the rostral pons that also contain the superior cerebellar peduncle. Pre-LC neurons in rats are found just rostral to one of the best-known nuclei in the brainstem, the LC, hence the name "pre-LC." The picture above shows the anatomic relationship between the pre-LC and LC. In this image, in the sagittal plane, the noradrenergic LC neurons are labeled in red, for TH (tyrosine hydroxylase, a catecholamine-synthetic enzyme found in all LC neurons). These red LC neurons and their rostral dendritic arborization are located caudal to (behind) all neurons in the pre-LC. The nuclei of pre-LC neurons are labeled in green, for FoxP2 (see above regarding FoxP2 as a marker for pre-LC neurons). Based on their shared connections, gene-expression, and c-Fos activity patterns, the pre-LC is probably related functionally to neurons in the parabrachial nucleus, which is located lateral to the pre-LC (out of the plane of section in this figure).

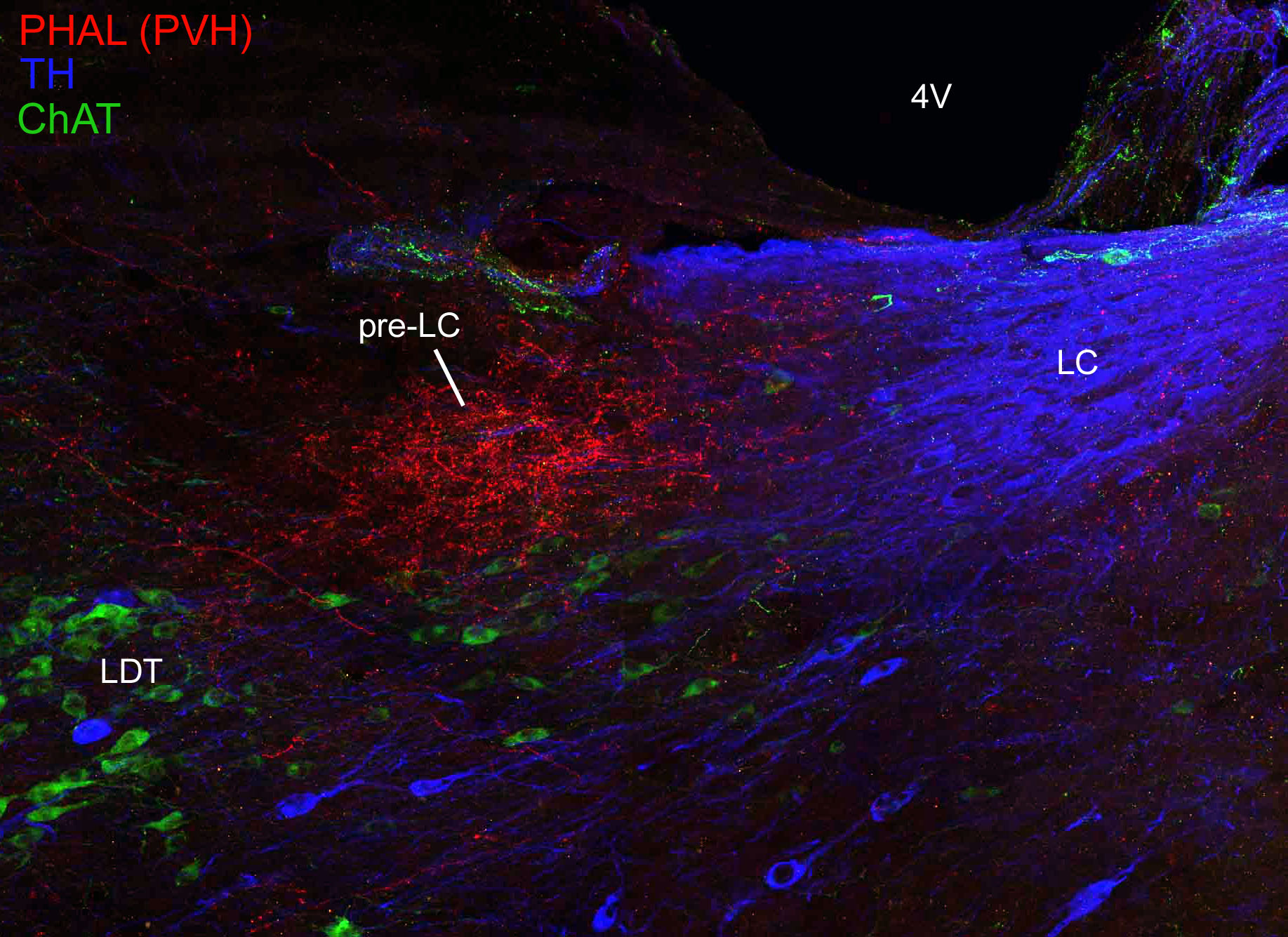
Sagittal section from the rat rostral, lateral pons (brainstem). Red labels axonal input from the paraventricular nucleus of the hypothalamus (PVH), targeting the center of the pre-locus coeruleus (pre-LC). Blue labels tyrosine hydroxylase (TH), which is found in all neurons of the locus coeruleus (LC). Green labels choline acetyltransferase (ChAT), which is found in all cholinergic neurons of the laterodorsal tegmental nucleus (LDT).

== Connections ==
The input connections of the pre-LC have not been studied comprehensively. As described above, the pre-LC receives heavy input from the HSD2 neuron subregion of the nucleus of the solitary tract; and this input appears to be functionally active based on c-Fos analysis . It also receives descending input from the paraventricular nucleus of the hypothalamus (PVH), as shown in the sagittal plane in the figure at right (red axon terminal labeling after injection into the PVH; LC neurons are labeled in blue, and the laterodorsal tegmental nucleus or LDT neurons is labeled in green).

The output connections of the pre-LC have been studied extensively, using anterograde axonal tracing experiments followed by retrograde axonal tracing experiments that utilized FoxP2 as a marker for the neurons in pre-LC. Pre-LC neurons project heavily to the diencephalon, particularly to subregions of the midline thalamus and the posterior and lateral hypothalamus.

== Function ==
To date, the function of pre-LC neurons remains unclear. Possibilities include inhibiting hunger and promoting sodium appetite, as discussed in references listed below.
