= H6PD =

Protein-coding gene in humans

Identifiers
- Aliases: H6PD, CORTRD1, G6PDH, GDH, hexose-6-phosphate dehydrogenase/glucose 1-dehydrogenase, H6PDH
- External IDs: OMIM: 138090; MGI: 2140356; GeneCards: H6PD
Enzyme activity
EC #	BRENDA	ExPASy	KEGG	MetaCyc
1.1.1.47	↗	↗	↗	↗
1.1.1.363	↗	↗	↗	↗
3.1.1.31	↗	↗	↗	↗

Gene location (Human)
Chr.	Chromosome 1 (human)
Band	1p36.22	Start	9,234,774 bp
Band	1p36.22	End	9,271,337 bp

Gene location (Mouse)
Chr.	Chromosome 4 (mouse)
Band	4 E2|4 80.65 cM	Start	150,063,932 bp
Band	4 E2|4 80.65 cM	End	150,093,480 bp
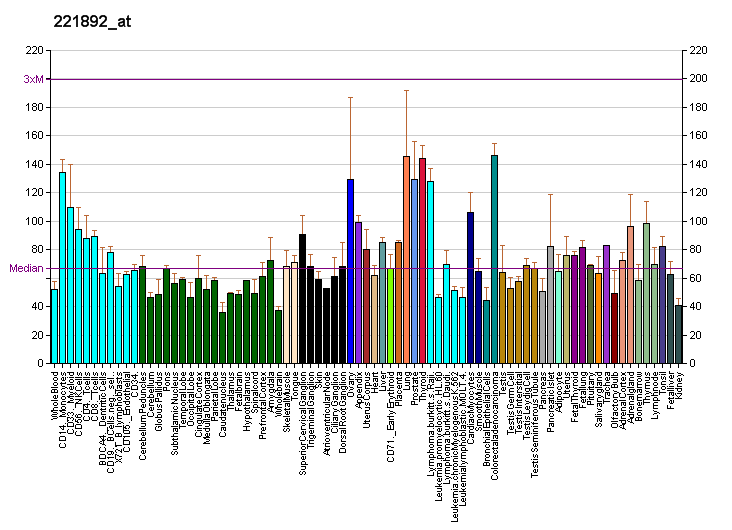

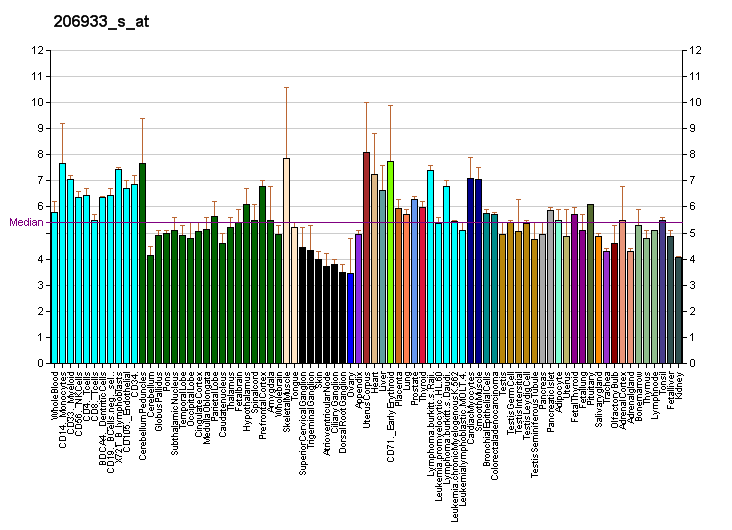
RNA expression pattern
Bgee	Human / Mouse (ortholog); Top expressed in: parotid gland; germinal epithelium; nipple; right lobe of liver; stromal cell of endometrium; body of tongue; synovial joint; pericardium; thoracic diaphragm; cardia / Top expressed in: left lobe of liver; lactiferous gland; submandibular gland; endothelial cell of lymphatic vessel; white adipose tissue; epithelium of small intestine; Ileal epithelium; left lung; brown adipose tissue; right lung; More reference expression data
BioGPS	More reference expression data
Gene ontology
Molecular function	glucose-6-phosphate dehydrogenase activity; oxidoreductase activity; 6-phosphogluconolactonase activity; glucose 1-dehydrogenase [NAD(P) activity]; catalytic activity; hydrolase activity; NADP binding; oxidoreductase activity, acting on CH-OH group of donors
Cellular component	endoplasmic reticulum lumen; endoplasmic reticulum
Biological process	pentose-phosphate shunt; metabolism; glucose metabolic process; carbohydrate metabolic process
Sources:Amigo / QuickGO
Orthologs
Databases	NCBI: entry; OMA: entry
Species	Human	Mouse
Entrez	9563	100198
Ensembl	ENSG00000049239	ENSMUSG00000028980
UniProt	O95479	Q8CFX1
RefSeq (mRNA)	NM_001282587; NM_004285	NM_001291004; NM_173371
RefSeq (protein)	NP_001269516; NP_004276	NP_001277933; NP_775547
Location (UCSC)	Chr 1: 9.23 – 9.27 Mb	Chr 4: 150.06 – 150.09 Mb
PubMed search
- Wikidata
View/Edit Human	View/Edit Mouse

GDH/6PGL endoplasmic bifunctional protein is a protein that in humans is encoded by the H6PD gene.

== Function ==
There are two forms of glucose-6-phosphate dehydrogenase. G form is X-linked and H form, encoded by this gene, is autosomally linked. This H form shows activity with other hexose-6-phosphates, especially galactose-6-phosphate, whereas the G form is specific for glucose-6-phosphate. Both forms are present in most tissues, but H form is not found in red cells.
