= Corticosteroid 11-beta-dehydrogenase isozyme 2 =

Enzyme found in humans

HSD11B2

Identifiers
- Aliases: HSD11B2, AME, AME1, HSD11K, HSD2, SDR9C3, hydroxysteroid (11-beta) dehydrogenase 2, hydroxysteroid 11-beta dehydrogenase 2
- External IDs: OMIM: 614232; MGI: 104720; GeneCards: HSD11B2

Gene location (Human)
Chr.	Chromosome 16 (human)
Band	16q22.1	Start	67,430,652 bp
Band	16q22.1	End	67,437,553 bp

Gene location (Mouse)
Chr.	Chromosome 8 (mouse)
Band	8 D3|8 53.04 cM	Start	106,245,387 bp
Band	8 D3|8 53.04 cM	End	106,250,620 bp
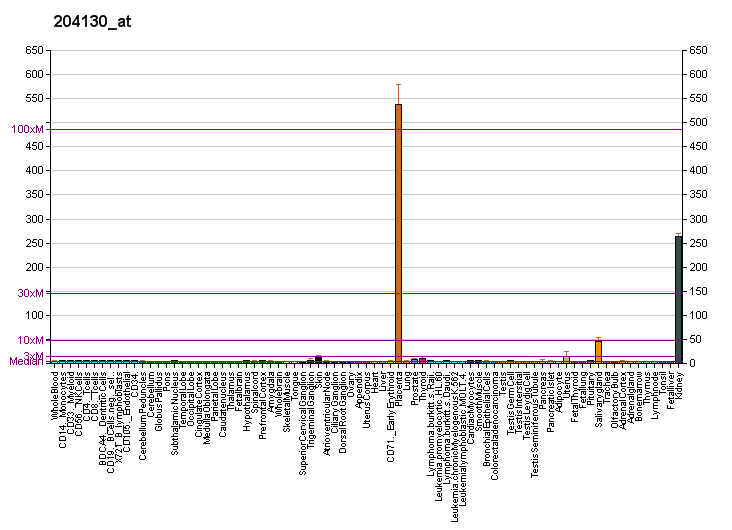
RNA expression pattern
Bgee	Human / Mouse (ortholog); Top expressed in: mucosa of transverse colon; renal medulla; rectum; human kidney; mucosa of ileum; parotid gland; skin of leg; mucosa of sigmoid colon; skin of abdomen; minor salivary glands / Top expressed in: left colon; right kidney; uterus; yolk sac; human kidney; otic vesicle; cervix; saccule; Gonadal ridge; abdominal wall; More reference expression data
BioGPS	More reference expression data
Gene ontology
Molecular function	NAD binding; steroid binding; oxidoreductase activity; 11-beta-hydroxysteroid dehydrogenase [NAD(P) activity]
Cellular component	cytoplasm; endoplasmic reticulum membrane; intracellular membrane-bounded organelle; endoplasmic reticulum
Biological process	response to hypoxia; glucocorticoid metabolic process; female pregnancy; response to steroid hormone; response to glucocorticoid; response to insulin; glucocorticoid biosynthetic process; regulation of blood volume by renal aldosterone; response to food
Sources:Amigo / QuickGO
Orthologs
Databases	NCBI: entry; OMA: entry
Species	Human	Mouse
Entrez	3291	15484
Ensembl	ENSG00000176387	ENSMUSG00000031891
UniProt	P80365	P51661
RefSeq (mRNA)	NM_000196	NM_008289
RefSeq (protein)	NP_000187	NP_032315
Location (UCSC)	Chr 16: 67.43 – 67.44 Mb	Chr 8: 106.25 – 106.25 Mb
PubMed search
- Wikidata
View/Edit Human	View/Edit Mouse

Corticosteroid 11-β-dehydrogenase isozyme 2 also known as 11-β-hydroxysteroid dehydrogenase 2 is an enzyme that in humans is encoded by the HSD11B2 gene.

== Function ==
Corticosteroid 11-β-dehydrogenase isozyme 2 is an NAD^{+}-dependent enzyme expressed in aldosterone-selective epithelial tissues such as the kidney, colon, salivary and sweat glands. HSD11B2 expression is also found in the brainstem in a small, aldosterone-sensitive subset of neurons located in the nucleus of the solitary tract referred to as HSD2 neurons.

In these tissues, HSD11B2 oxidizes the glucocorticoid cortisol to the inactive metabolite cortisone, thus preventing illicit activation of the mineralocorticoid receptor. This protective mechanism is necessary because cortisol circulates at 100- to 1000-fold higher concentrations than aldosterone, and binds with equal affinity to the mineralocorticoid receptor, thereby out-competing aldosterone in cells that do not produce HSD11B2.

This glucocorticoid-inactivating enzyme is also expressed in tissues that do not express the mineralocorticoid receptor, such as the placenta and testis, as well as parts of the developing brain, including the rhombencephalic progenitor cells that proliferate into cerebellar granule cells. In these tissues, HSD11B2 protects cells from the growth-inhibiting and/or pro-apoptotic effects of cortisol, particularly during embryonic development.

== Clinical significance ==
Inhibition of this enzyme, for example by the compound glycyrrhetinic acid enzymatically converted from glycyrrhizic acid, found in natural liquorice, results in a condition known as pseudohyperaldosteronism. A genetically inherited deficiency of HSD11B2 is the underlying cause of the syndrome of apparent mineralocorticoid excess.
