= HSD2 neuron =

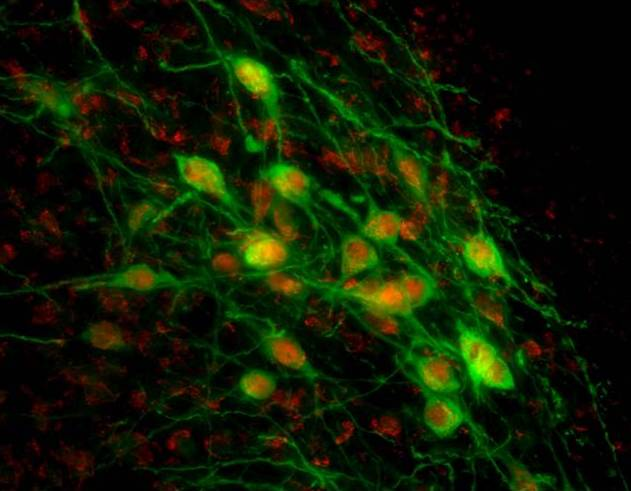
HSD2 neurons in the nucleus of the solitary tract (HSD2=green immunofluorescence; MR=red)

HSD2 neurons are a small group of neurons in the brainstem which are uniquely sensitive to the mineralocorticosteroid hormone aldosterone, through expression of HSD11B2. They are located within the caudal medulla oblongata, in the nucleus of the solitary tract (NTS). HSD2 neurons are activated during a prolonged deficit in body sodium or fluid volume, as occurs after dietary sodium deprivation or during frank hypovolemia. They are also activated by supraphysiologic stimulation of the mineralocorticoid receptor. They are inactivated when salt is ingested. To date, HSD2 neurons have been identified and studied only in rats and mice.

== Basic characteristics ==
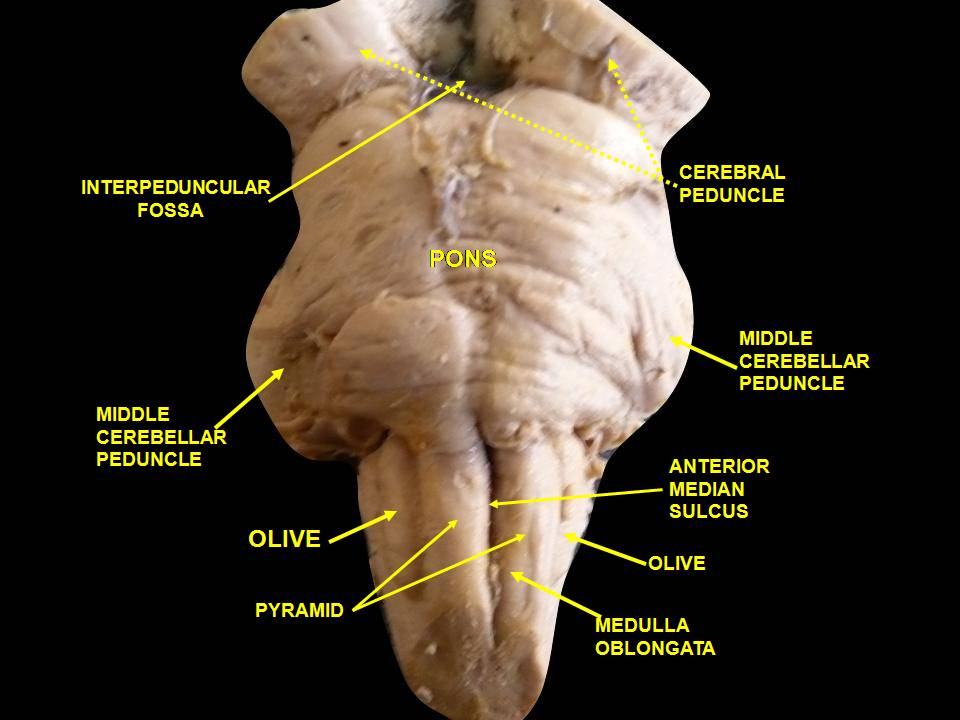
Brainstem(where HSD2 neurons are located)

The term "HSD2 neurons" is used in the scientific literature to refer to a subpopulation of neurons in the NTS which express both the mineralocorticoid receptor (MR) and 11-beta-hydroxysteroid dehydrogenase type 2 (HSD2). HSD2 is an enzyme that metabolizes cortisol and other glucocorticosteroids, which typically prevent aldosterone from binding to the mineralocorticoid receptor. This pre-receptor mechanism for modifying hormone binding is necessary for cellular sensitivity to aldosterone because, under physiologic conditions, cortisol circulates at 100-1000 times higher concentrations than aldosterone. As both cortisol and aldosterone bind the mineralocorticoid receptor with equal affinity, cortisol effectively crowds out aldosterone in cells without abundant HSD2. In cells with HSD2, however, aldosterone has increased access to the MR, such that increases and decreases in the circulating concentration of this hormone will produce a change in receptor activity. In HSD2 neurons (and all other cells that express both HSD2 and MR), aldosterone binds to MR and translocates it from the cytoplasm to the nucleus, causing transcriptional changes. Unlike aldosterone-sensitive cells in epithelial tissues (e.g. in the kidney), the physiologic effects of aldosterone-MR activation in HSD2 neurons are unknown. It has been suggested, but not proven, that aldosterone promotes the firing activity of these neurons. Aldosterone is not necessary for HSD2 neuron activation because this can be evoked by sodium deprivation even in rats without adrenal glands, which are the exclusive source of circulating aldosterone.

HSD2 neurons express the transcription factor Phox2b. This means that HSD2 neurons probably release the excitatory transmitter glutamate onto their synaptic target neurons, as all Phox2b-expressing neurons in the NTS express the vesicular glutamate transporter VGlut2. HSD2 neurons do not produce a wide array of other proteins that typify most other subtypes of NTS neurons, including tyrosine hydroxylase, choline acetyltransferase, nitric oxide synthase, cholecystokinin, neurotensin, neuropeptide FF, substance P, somatostatin, inhibin-β, glucagon-like peptide-1, corticotropin-releasing hormone, dynorphin, calretinin, and calbindin. A small number of HSD2 neurons (less than 2%) may express the neuropeptide galanin. Their lack of expression of the aforementioned markers suggests that HSD2 neurons form a unique subpopulation within the NTS. To date, there is no information available about the electrophysiologic characteristics of these neurons.

== Input and output connections ==
The efferent projections (axonal output) of HSD2 neurons have been investigated to a significant degree using conventional neuroanatomical tracers. Their primary output targets are the pre-locus coeruleus (pre-LC), the innermost portion of the external lateral parabrachial subnucleus (PBel), and the anterior, ventrolateral bed nucleus of the stria terminalis (BSTvl). The next-order input and output connections of these target regions have been investigated in detail as well. Additional information about the efferent projections of HSD2 neurons can be found in ref.

Regarding the afferent (input) connections to HSD2 neurons, available information is less complete. Experiments with conventional tracers and immunofluorescence staining have demonstrated peripheral viscerosensory input from the vagus nerve, input from nearby neurons in the NTS and area postrema, and descending input from the medial central nucleus of the amygdala (CeA) and paraventricular hypothalamic nucleus (PVN). It is likely that other sources of input exist, but a comprehensive study of HSD2 neuron afferent connections has not been conducted.

== HSD2 neuron activity ==
An immediate-early gene, c-fos, has been used to study the activation and inactivation of HSD2 neurons extensively in vivo. The presence of nuclear c-Fos implies recent, elevated neuronal activity, and c-Fos disappears after neurons become quiescent. Very few HSD2 neurons exhibit any c-Fos in a normal animal. If, however, sodium is removed from the diet for several days to a week, most HSD2 neurons become c-Fos-positive. Then, if salty food is eaten or a concentrated saline solution is imbibed, their c-Fos disappears. Several other experimental conditions that reduce extracellular fluid volume—including PEG-hypovolemia, diuresis, and adrenalectomy—also activate HSD2 neurons, although none do so to as great an extent as simply removing sodium from the diet.

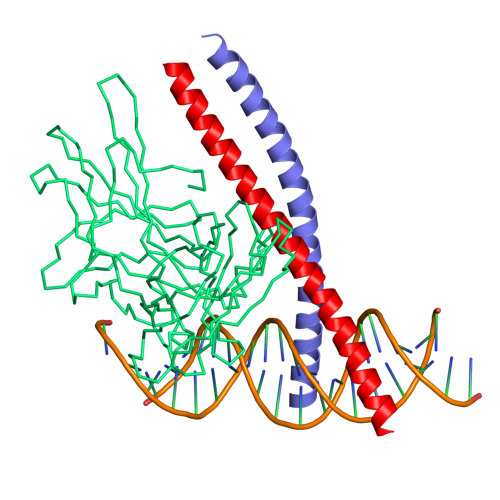
Fos

All of these conditions, with the exception of adrenalectomy, cause a large elevation of circulating aldosterone. Correspondingly, repeated administration of the mineralocorticosteroid hormone deoxycorticosterone acetate (DOCA) produces a moderate increase in HSD2 neuron activity (c-Fos) without any sodium or volume deficit. However, even after adrenalectomy, HSD2 neurons become activated by sodium deprivation, proving that MR activation is not necessary for their activity. Thus, aldosterone may be sufficient, but is not necessary for their activation, meaning that these neurons integrate additional neural or hormonal input signals.

All of the aforementioned manipulations which activate HSD2 neurons also produce sodium appetite in rats. If sodium-deprived rats are allowed access to salt, they imbibe a large quantity of it, and soon afterwards their HSD2 neurons are inactivated (they exhibit little or no c-Fos within 1–2 hours). This phenomenon of salt-intake-induced inactivation also occurs after sodium appetite and HSD2 neuron activation are produced by DOCA, which does not produce any sodium or volume deficit. Thus, HSD2 neuron inactivation by salt intake does not reflect simply the repletion of a physiologic deficit, and may instead reflect active inhibition triggered by salt ingestion. The exact mechanism for this inhibition remains unknown.

An interesting and unique feature of HSD2 neuron activity is that they are not activated by several stimuli that produce pronounced c-Fos activation in most other neurons in the NTS. These stimuli include severe dehydration induced by hypertonic saline administration, salt ingestion (above), and changes in blood pressure. Thus, HSD2 neurons are selectively activated by conditions which do not significantly affect surrounding NTS neurons, and they are not stimulated (or are actively inhibited) by conditions that do prominently activate most other NTS neurons.

== HSD2 neuron functions ==
The close association between sodium deprivation and HSD2 neuron activation—and between salt ingestion and HSD2 neuron inactivation—led to the suggestion that these neurons are important for driving sodium appetite. Other functional roles have been hypothesized. For discussion, see reviews in and. At present, however, no data exist to show whether these neurons are necessary or sufficient for any particular neurologic or physiologic function.
