= Enoxolone =

Chemical compound

Clinical data
- Trade names: Arthrodont, PruClair
- AHFS/Drugs.com: International Drug Names
- Routes of administration: Oral, topical
- ATC code: D03AX10 (WHO)

Legal status
- Legal status: US: ℞-only

Identifiers
- IUPAC name: (2S,4aS,6aS,6bR,8aR,10S,12aS,12bR,14bR)-10-hydroxy-2,4a,6a,6b,9,9,12a-heptamethyl-13-oxo-1,2,3,4,4a,5,6,6a,6b,7,8,8a,9,10,11,12,12a,12b,13,14b-icosahydropicene-2-carboxylic acid
- CAS Number: 471-53-4
- PubChem CID: 10114
- DrugBank: DB13089
- ChemSpider: 9710
- UNII: P540XA09DR
- KEGG: D00156
- ChEBI: CHEBI:30853
- ChEMBL: ChEMBL230006
- CompTox Dashboard (EPA): DTXSID9020669
- ECHA InfoCard: 100.006.769

Chemical and physical data
- Formula: C_{30}H_{46}O_{4}
- Molar mass: 470.694 g·mol^{−1}
- 3D model (JSmol): Interactive image
- SMILES: O=C(O)[C@]5(C)C[C@H]4/C3=C/C(=O)[C@H]1[C@](CC[C@@H]2[C@]1(C)CC[C@H](O)C2(C)C)(C)[C@]3(C)CC[C@@]4(C)CC5
- InChI: InChI=1S/C30H46O4/c1-25(2)21-8-11-30(7)23(28(21,5)10-9-22(25)32)20(31)16-18-19-17-27(4,24(33)34)13-12-26(19,3)14-15-29(18,30)6/h16,19,21-23,32H,8-15,17H2,1-7H3,(H,33,34)/t19-,21-,22-,23+,26+,27-,28-,29+,30+/m0/s1; Key:MPDGHEJMBKOTSU-YKLVYJNSSA-N

Enoxolone (INN, BAN; also known as glycyrrhetinic acid or glycyrrhetic acid) is a pentacyclic triterpenoid derivative of the beta-amyrin type obtained from the hydrolysis of glycyrrhizic acid, which was obtained from the herb liquorice.

The substance has a sweet taste, so it is used in flavoring to mask the bitter taste of drugs like aloe and quinine. It may have some anti-inflammatory activities. One of its metabolites is responsible for the blood pressure-increasing effect of liquorice.

== Medical uses ==
=== Oral topical ===
In Turkey, enoxolone is used in an "Anzibel" lozenge in combination with benzocaine (a local anesthetic) and chlorhexidine hydrochloride (an antibacterial).

It is found in an over-the-counter "Arthrodont" toothpaste. Evidence for the ingredient's usefulness for plaque and gingivitis is lacking.

=== Skin topical ===
In Japan, enoxolone is an active ingredient in the Salonpas brand of pain relief patch.

It is also used in the Singaporean "Vetic" cream. In the United States, it is found in PruClair, a "precription medical device" indicated for generic dermatoses.

=== Possible other uses ===
Enoxolone is effective in the treatment of peptic ulcer and also has expectorant (antitussive) properties. It has some additional pharmacological properties with possible antiviral, antifungal, antiprotozoal, and antibacterial activities.

== Mechanism of action ==
=== Anti-inflammatory ===
Glycyrrhetinic acid inhibits the enzymes (15-hydroxyprostaglandin dehydrogenase and delta-13-prostaglandin reductase) that metabolize the prostaglandins PGE-2 and PGF-2α to their respective, inactive 15-keto-13,14-dihydro metabolites. This increases prostaglandins in the digestive system. Prostaglandins inhibit gastric secretion, stimulate pancreatic secretion and mucous secretion in the intestines, and markedly increase intestinal motility. They also cause cell proliferation in the stomach. The effect on gastric acid secretion, and promotion of mucous secretion and cell proliferation shows why licorice has potential in treating peptic ulcers.

Excessive consumption of glycyrrhetinic acid can cause a significant rise in blood pressure. Liquorice root should not be consumed during pregnancy.

The structure of glycyrrhetinic acid is similar to that of cortisone. Both molecules are flat and similar at positions 3 and 11. This might be the basis for liquorice's anti-inflammatory action.

=== Hypertensive ===
3-β-D-(Monoglucuronyl)-18-β-glycyrrhetinic acid, a metabolite of glycyrrhetinic acid, inhibits the conversion of 'active' cortisol to 'inactive' cortisone in the kidneys. This occurs via inhibition of the enzyme 11-β-hydroxysteroid dehydrogenase. As a result, cortisol levels become high within the collecting duct of the kidney. Cortisol has intrinsic mineralocorticoid properties (that is, it acts like aldosterone and increases sodium reabsorption) that work on ENaC channels in the collecting duct. Hypertension develops due to this mechanism of sodium retention. People often have high blood pressure with a low renin and low aldosterone blood level. The increased amounts of cortisol binds to the unprotected, nonspecific mineralocorticoid receptors and induce sodium and fluid retention, hypokalaemia, high blood pressure, and inhibition of the renin-angiotensin-aldosterone system. Therefore, licorice should not be given to patients with a known history of hypertension in doses sufficient to inhibit 11-β-hydroxysteroid dehydrogenase.

== Derivatives ==
Glycyrrhetinic acid derivatives, where R is a variable functional group

In glycyrrhetinic acid, the functional group (R) is a hydroxyl group. Research in 2005 demonstrated that with a proper functional group a very effective glycyrrhetinic artificial sweetener can be obtained. When R is an anionic NHCO(CH_{2})CO_{2}K side chain, the sweetening effect is found to be 1200 times that of sugar (human sensory panel data). A shorter or longer spacer reduces the sweetening effect. One explanation is that the taste bud cell receptor has 1.3 nanometers (13 angstroms) available for docking with the sweetener molecule. In addition, the sweetener molecule requires three proton donor positions, of which two reside at the extremities, to be able to interact efficiently with the receptor cavity.

A synthetic analog, carbenoxolone, was developed in Britain. Both glycyrrhetinic acid and carbenoxolone have a modulatory effect on neural signaling through gap junction channels.

Acetoxolone, the acetyl derivative of glycyrrhetinic acid, is a drug used in the treatment of peptic ulcer and gastroesophageal reflux disease.

== See also ==
- 11α-Hydroxyprogesterone
