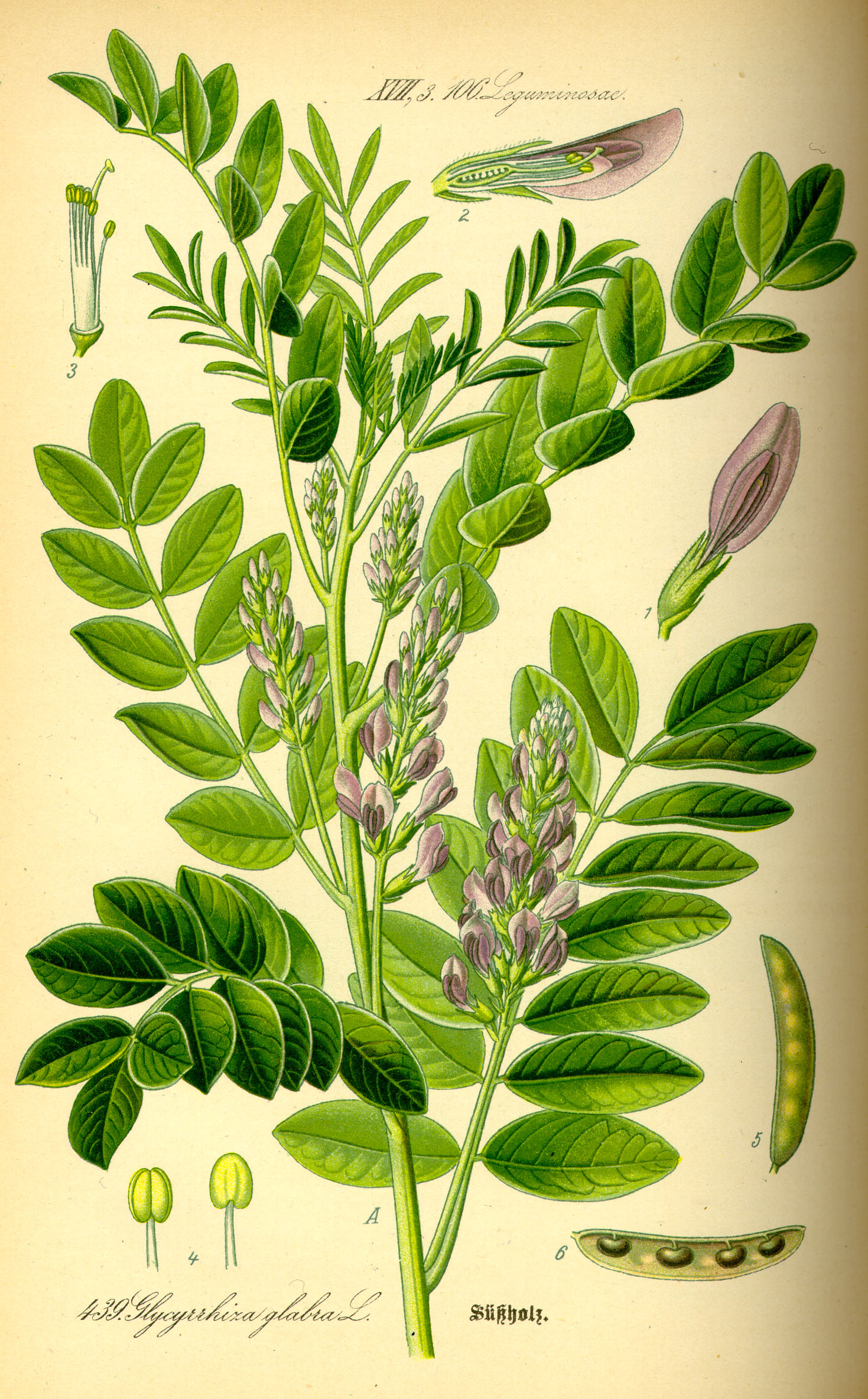

Conservation status
- Least Concern (IUCN 3.1)

Scientific classification
- Kingdom: Plantae
- Clade: Tracheophytes
- Clade: Angiosperms
- Clade: Eudicots
- Clade: Rosids
- Order: Fabales
- Family: Fabaceae
- Subfamily: Faboideae
- Clade: Inverted repeat-lacking clade
- Genus: Glycyrrhiza
- Species: G. glabra

Binomial name
- Glycyrrhiza glabra L.

Synonyms
- Glycyrrhiza brachycarpa (Boiss.); Glycyrrhiza glandulifera Waldst. & Kit.); Glycyrrhiza hirsuta (Pall.); Glycyrrhiza pallida (Boiss.); Glycyrrhiza violacea (Boiss.)

= Liquorice =

Root of Glycyrrhiza glabra

Liquorice (Commonwealth English) or licorice (American English; see spelling differences; IPA: /ˈlɪkərɪʃ, -ɪs/ LIK-ər-ish, -iss) is the common name of Glycyrrhiza glabra, a flowering plant of the bean family Fabaceae, from the root of which a sweet, aromatic flavouring is extracted.

The liquorice plant is an herbaceous perennial legume native to West Asia, Tropical Asia, North Africa, and Southern Europe. Liquorice is used as a flavouring in confectionery, tobacco, beverages, and pharmaceuticals, and is marketed as a dietary supplement.

Liquorice extracts have been used in herbalism and traditional medicine. Excessive consumption of liquorice (more than 2 mg/kg [0.91 mg/lb] per day of pure glycyrrhizinic acid, a key component of liquorice) can lead to undesirable consequences. Clinically, it is suspected that overindulgence in liquorice may manifest as unexplained hypertension, low blood potassium levels (hypokalemia), and muscle weakness in individuals. Consuming liquorice root extract should be avoided during pregnancy.

== Etymology ==
The word liquorice (UK), or licorice (US), is derived via the Anglo-French lycorys, from Late Latin liquiritia, itself ultimately derived from Greek γλυκύρριζα, glykyrrhiza (the Modern Greek spelling of the genus is γλυκόριζα, glykoriza) literally meaning 'sweet root' and referring to Glycyrrhiza glabra.

The latter gives the plant binomial name with glabra meaning smooth and referring to the plant's smooth husks; the former came to being via the influence of liquere, 'to become fluid', reflecting the method of extracting the sweet component from the roots.

As of 2021, its English common name is spelled 'liquorice' in most of the Commonwealth, but 'licorice' is used in other countries.

== Description ==
Liquorice is a herbaceous perennial, growing to 1 metre (40 in) in height, with pinnate leaves about 7–15 cm (3–6 in) long, with 9–17 leaflets. The flowers are 8–12 mm (5/16–1/2 in) long, purple to pale whitish blue, produced in a loose inflorescence. The fruit is an oblong pod, 20–30 mm (3/4–1 1/8 in) long, containing several seeds. The roots are stoloniferous.

== Chemistry ==
Much of the sweetness in liquorice comes from glycyrrhizin.

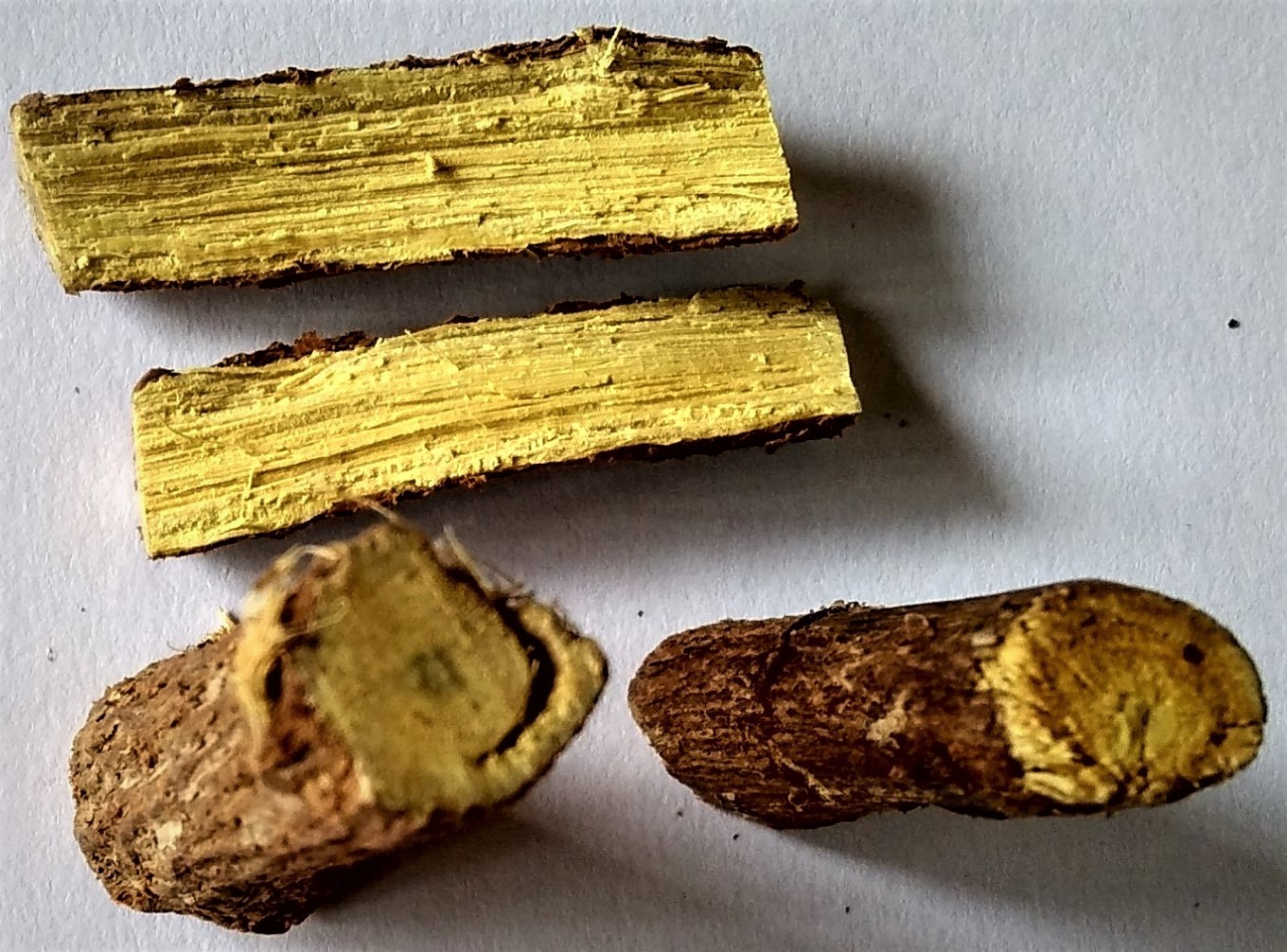
Sections of liquorice root

Liquorice root contains triterpenoids, polyphenols, and polysaccharides. Flavonoids account for the yellow root colour. The principal glycoside, glycyrrhizin, exists in content of 7% to 10%, depending on cultivation practices. The isoflavene glabrene and the isoflavane glabridin, found in the roots of liquorice, are phytoestrogens.

The scent of liquorice root comes from a complex and variable combination of compounds, of which anethole is some 3% of total volatiles. Much of the sweetness in liquorice comes from glycyrrhizin, which has 30–50 times the sweetness of sugar. The sweetness is different from sugar, being less instant, tart, and lasting longer.

== Cultivation and uses ==
Liquorice grows best in well-drained soils in deep valleys with full sun. It is harvested in the autumn two to three years after planting. Countries producing liquorice include Turkey, Greece, Iran, and Iraq.

=== Tobacco ===
Liquorice is used as a flavouring agent for tobacco, for flavour-enhancing and moistening agents in the manufacture of American blend cigarettes, moist snuff, chewing tobacco, and pipe tobacco. Liquorice provides tobacco products with a natural sweetness and a distinctive flavour that blends readily with the natural and imitation flavouring components employed in the tobacco industry. Liquorice can also be added to cigarette rolling papers. As of 2009, the US Food and Drug Administration banned the use of any "characterizing flavors" other than menthol from cigarettes, but not other manufactured tobacco products.

=== Food and confectionery ===
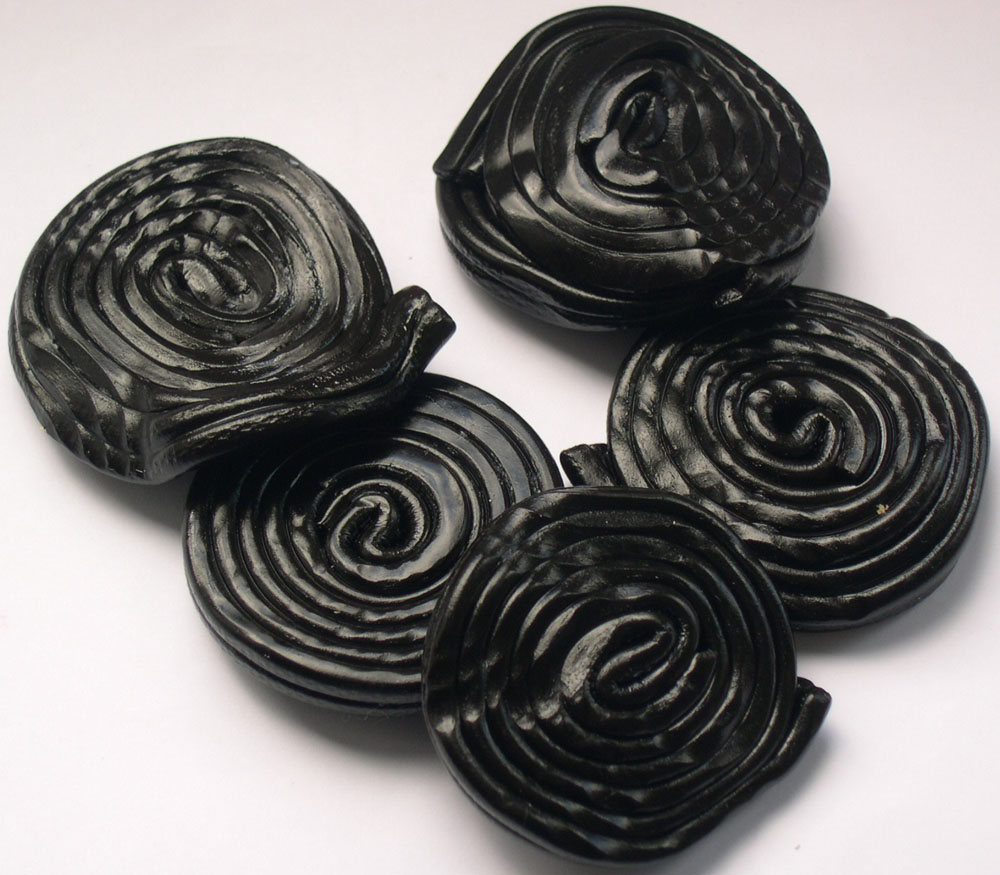
Black liquorice wheels, a common candy preparation

Liquorice flavour is found in a wide variety of candies or sweets. In most of these candies, the taste is reinforced by aniseed oil so the actual content of liquorice is low.

In the Netherlands, liquorice confectionery (drop) is a common sweet sold in many forms. Mixing it with mint, menthol, aniseed, or laurel is common. It is also mixed with ammonium chloride (salmiak); salmiak liquorice in the Netherlands is known as zoute drop ('salty liquorice'). Strong, salty sweets are also consumed in Nordic countries where liquorice flavoured alcohols are sold, particularly in Denmark and Finland.

Dried sticks of the liquorice root are a traditional confectionery in the Netherlands as they once were in Britain. They were sold simply as sticks of zoethout ('sweet wood') to chew on as a candy.

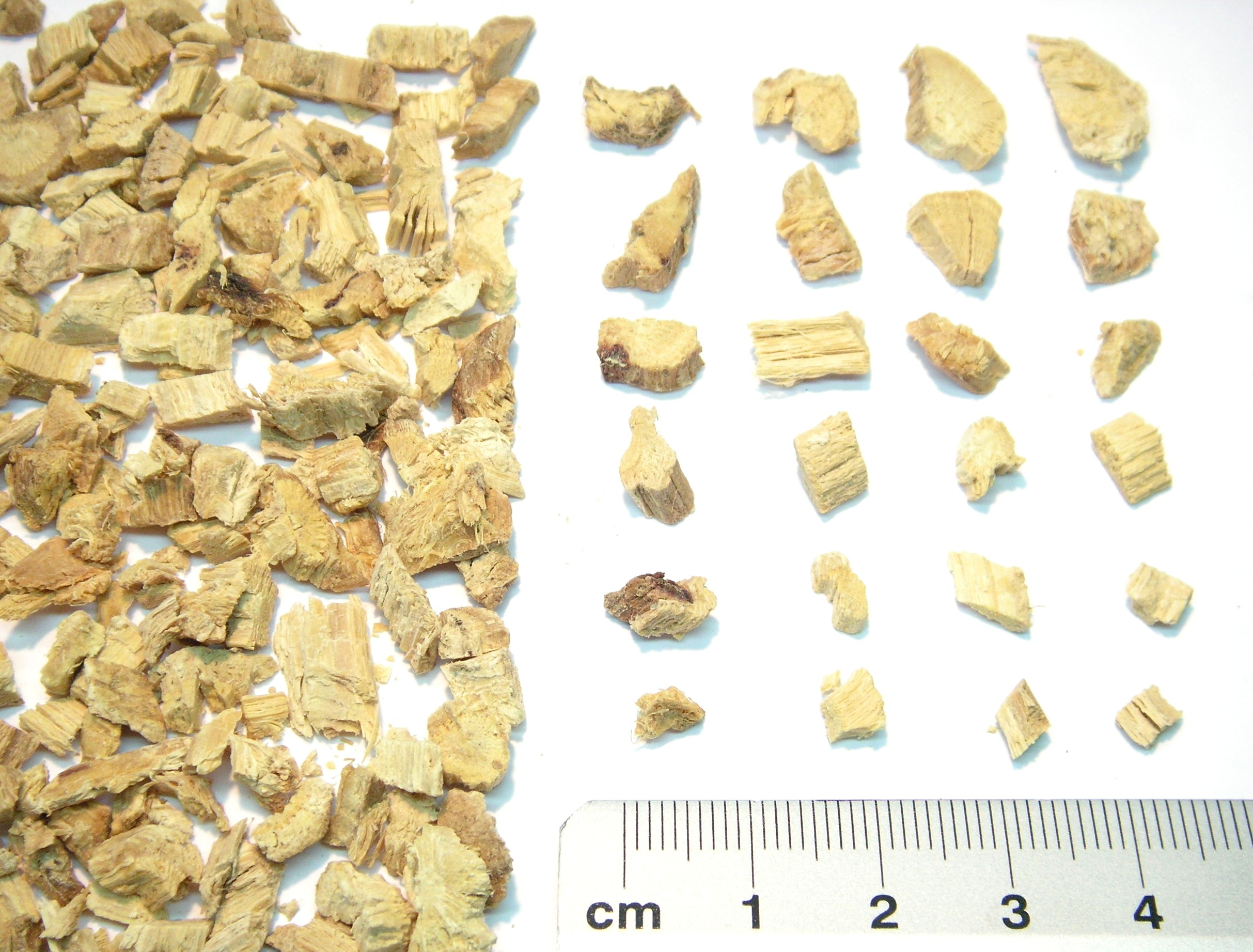
Liquorice root chips

Pontefract in Yorkshire, England, is where liquorice mixed with sugar began to be used as a sweet in the contemporary way. Pontefract cakes were originally made there. In Cumbria, County Durham, Yorkshire and Lancashire, it is colloquially known as 'Spanish', supposedly because Spanish monks grew liquorice root at Rievaulx Abbey near Thirsk.

In Italy, Spain, and France, liquorice is used in its natural form. The root of the plant is simply harvested, washed, dried, and chewed as a mouth freshener. Throughout Italy, unsweetened liquorice is consumed in the form of small black pieces made only from 100% pure liquorice extract.

=== Drinks ===
In the Calabria region of Italy, a liqueur is made from pure liquorice extract and in Reggio Emilia a soft drink called acqua d'orcio is made.

In Egypt and other parts of the Arab world, including the Levant, a traditional drink called Erq sous is made from dried licorice roots combined with baking soda and water. This beverage is especially popular during Ramadan.

In southeastern Turkey, such as in Diyarbakır, liquorice root is traditionally made into a chilled beverage that is most commonly consumed in summer.

=== Research ===
Properties of glycyrrhizin are under preliminary research, such as for hepatitis C or topical treatment of psoriasis, but the low quality of studies as of 2017 prevents conclusions about efficacy and safety.

=== Traditional medicine ===
In traditional Chinese medicine, a related species G. uralensis (often translated as "liquorice") is known as gancao (Chinese: 甘草; lit. 'sweet grass'), and is believed to "harmonize" the ingredients in a formula, although there is no high-quality clinical research to indicate it is safe or effective for any medicinal purpose. In 2007, the European Medicines Agency added liquorice to their list of herbal therapies for mild respiratory and gastrointestinal illnesses.

=== Fungicide ===
The essential oils inhibit the growth of Aspergillus flavus.

== Adverse effects ==
=== Consumption levels ===
The United States Food and Drug Administration regards that foods containing liquorice and its derivatives (including glycyrrhizin) are generally recognized as safe for use as a food ingredient, if not consumed excessively. Other jurisdictions have suggested no more than 100–200 mg (1.5–3.1 grains) of glycyrrhizin per day, the equivalent of about 70–150 g (2 1/2–5 1/4 oz) of liquorice confectionery. Although liquorice is considered safe as a food ingredient, glycyrrhizin can cause serious side effects if consumed in large amounts (above 0.2 mg per kg per day). One estimate is that a normal healthy person can consume 10 mg (0.15 grains) of glycyrrhizic acid per day.

Because the composition of liquorice extracts in various products may exist in a broad range, there is not enough scientific information to determine that a specific level of intake is safe or unsafe.

=== Physiological effects ===
The effects of excessive liquorice consumption on lowering potassium levels in the blood and increasing blood pressure are a particular concern for people with hypertension (high blood pressure) or heart or kidney disease.

Some adverse effects of liquorice consumed in amounts of 50 to 200 g per day over four weeks appear to be caused by glycyrrhizic acid (75 to 540 mg per day glycyrrhetinic acid) causing increases in blood pressure.

Apparent mineralocorticoid excess syndrome can occur when the body retains sodium, and loses potassium, altering biochemical and hormonal regulation. Some of these activities may include raised aldosterone levels, decline of the renin–angiotensin system and increased levels of the atrial natriuretic hormone in order to compensate the variations in homoeostasis.

Other adverse effects may include electrolyte imbalance, oedema, increased blood pressure, weight gain, heart problems, and weakness. Symptoms depend on the severity of toxicity. Some other complaints include fatigue, shortness of breath, kidney failure, and paralysis.

=== Potential for toxicity ===
The major dose-limiting toxicities of liquorice are corticosteroid in nature, because of the inhibitory effect that its chief active constituents, glycyrrhizin and enoxolone, have on cortisol degradation, and include oedema, hypokalaemia, weight gain or loss, and hypertension.

=== Pregnancy ===
Due to the possibility of premature birth and health problems in children whose mothers consumed large amounts (about 250 g (8.8 oz)) of liquorice extract per week, it is variously advised that during pregnancy "oral licorice extract in large amounts should be avoided", liquorice "should be avoided" and "Liquorice is safe to eat. But you should avoid liquorice root."

== Gallery ==
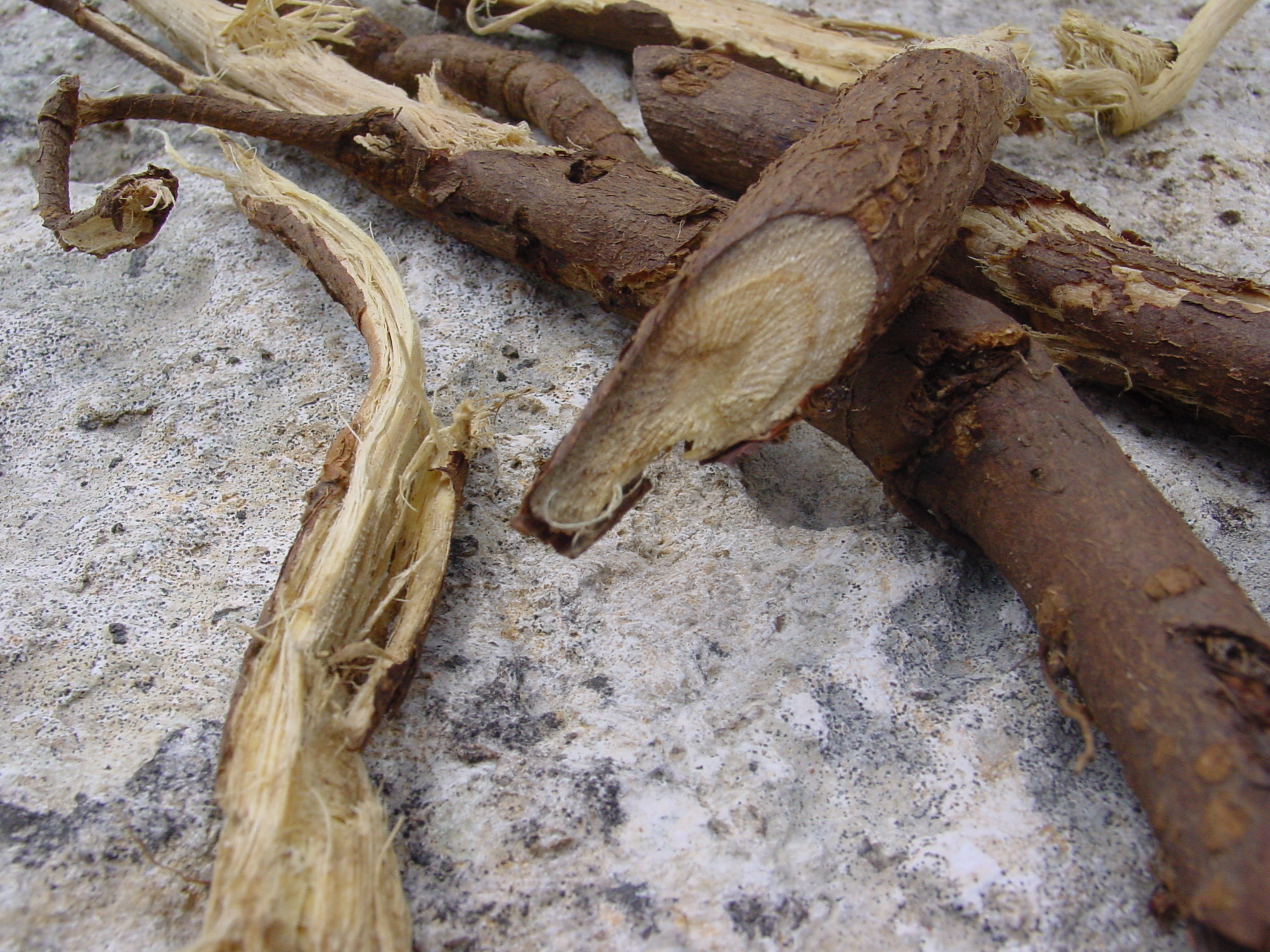
Liquorice root with bark

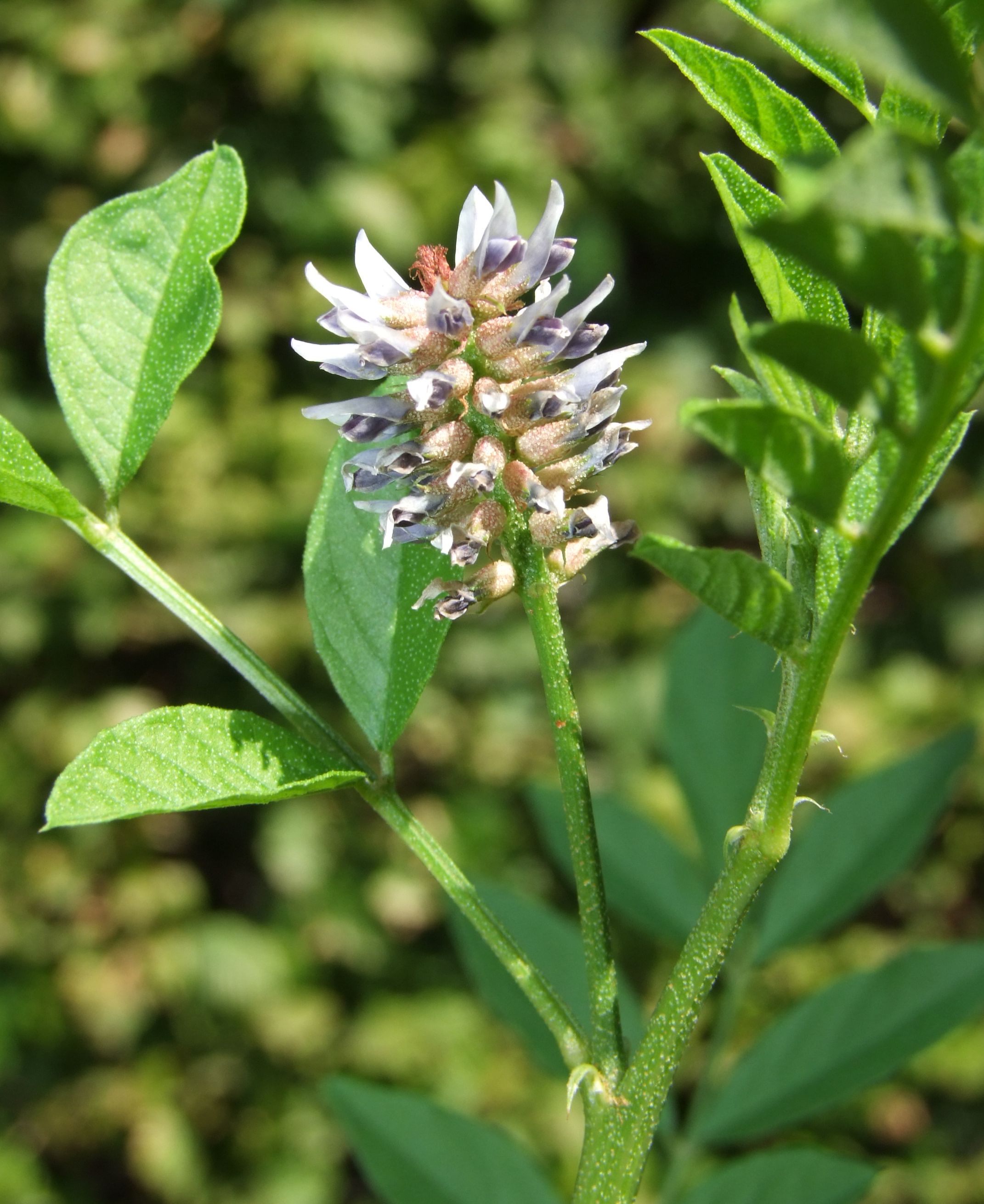
Inflorescence of G. glabra

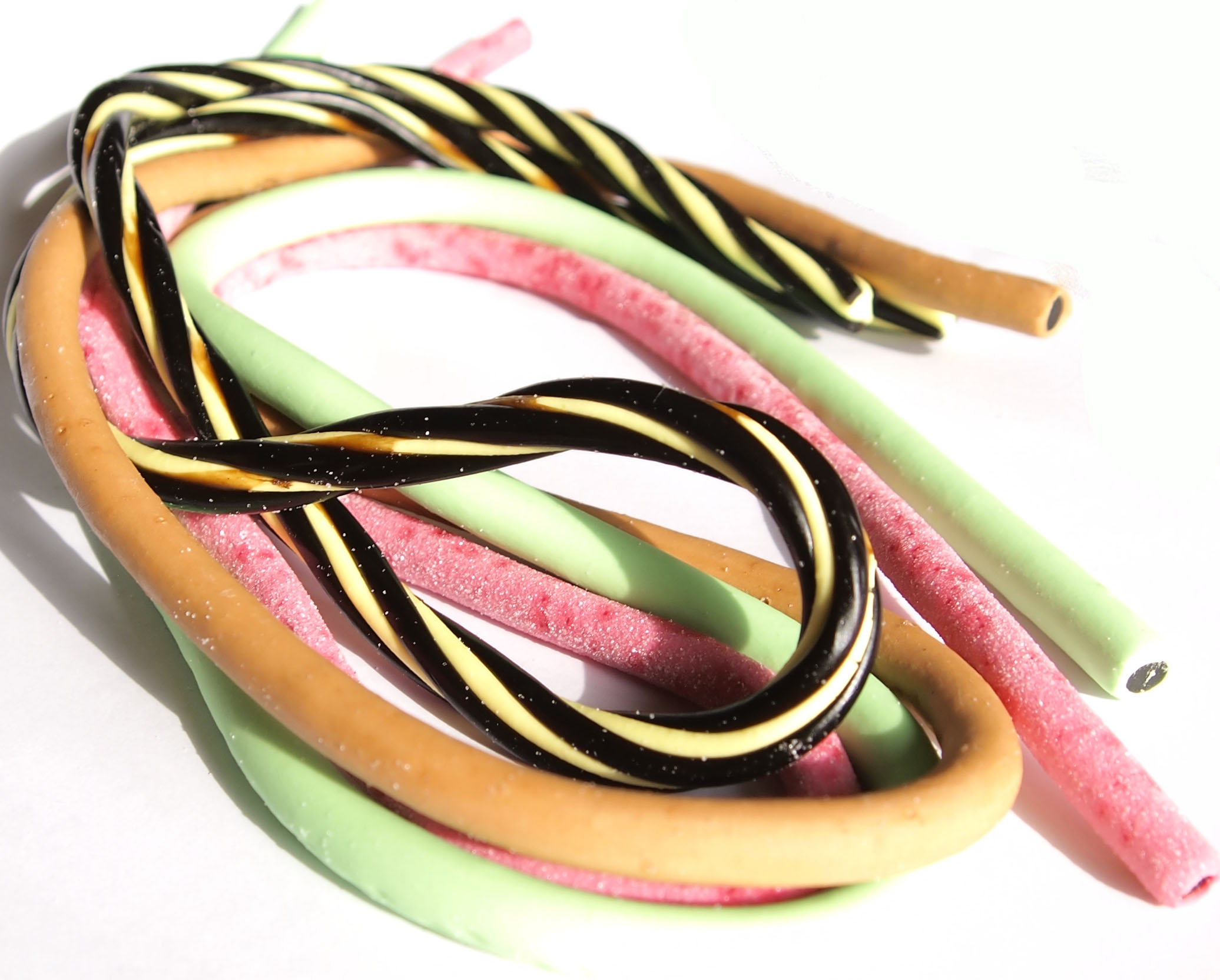
Different flavoured liquorice sticks

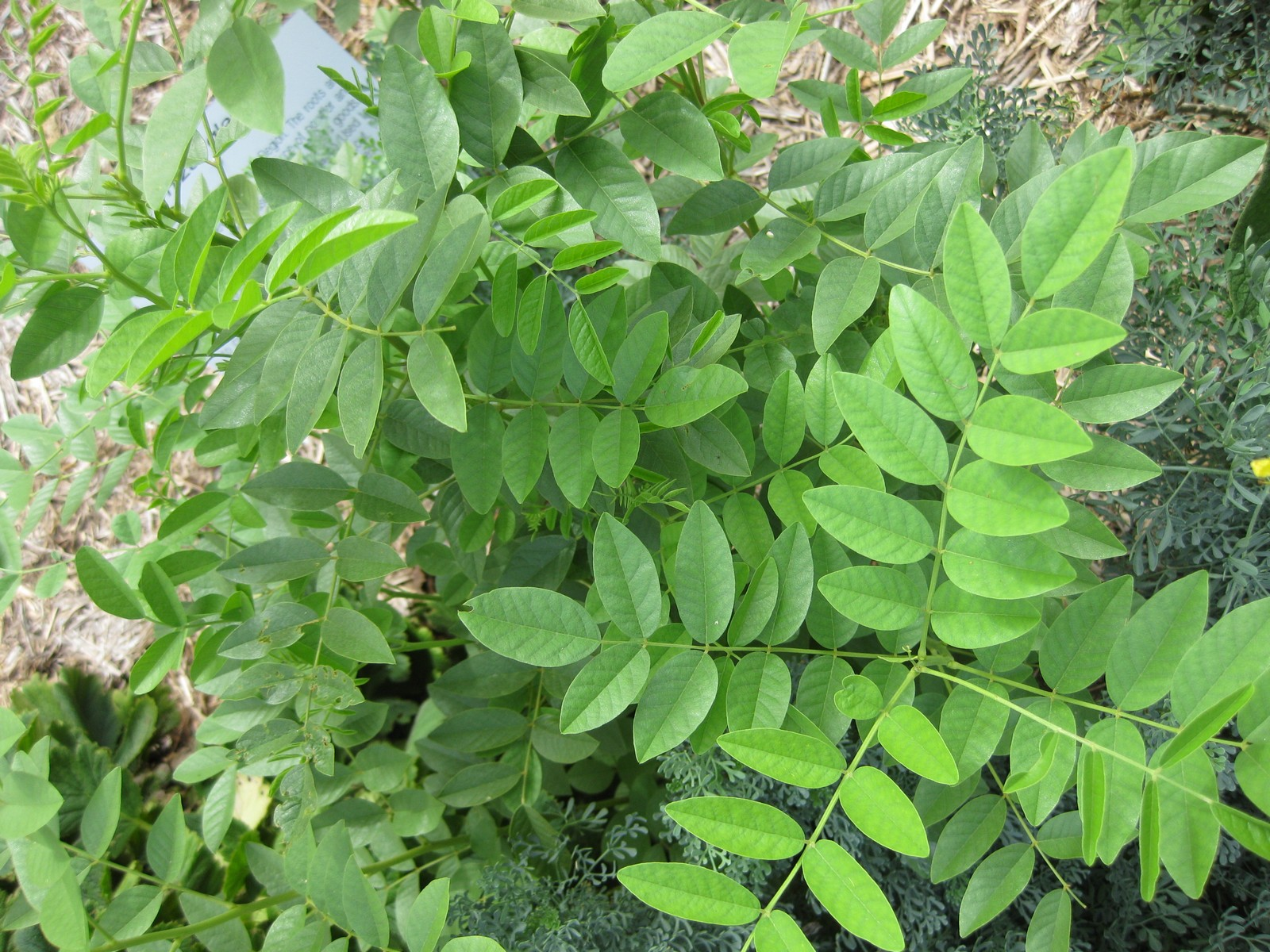
Foliage
