= Glycyrrhizin =

Main sweet-tasting constituent of liquorice

Glycyrrhizic acid

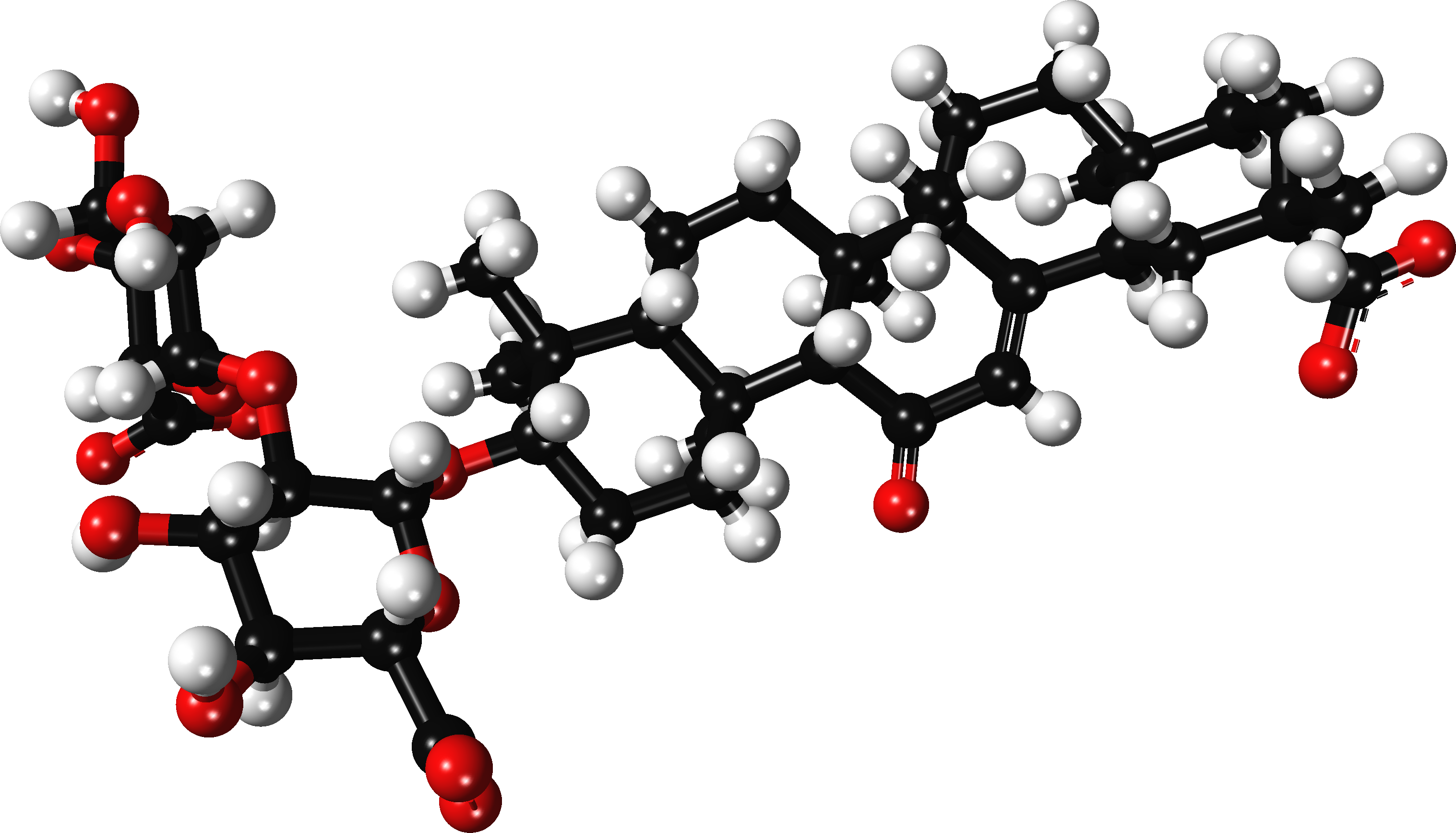

Clinical data
- Trade names: Epigen, Glycyron
- AHFS/Drugs.com: International Drug Names
- Routes of administration: Oral, intravenous
- ATC code: A05BA08 (WHO) QA05BA08 (vet)

Pharmacokinetic data
- Metabolism: Hepatic and by intestinal bacteria
- Elimination half-life: 6.2–10.2 hours
- Excretion: Faeces, urine (0.31–0.67%)

Identifiers
- IUPAC name: (3β,20β)-20-carboxy-11-oxo-30-norolean-12-en-3-yl 2-O-β-D-glucopyranuronosyl-α-D-glucopyranosiduronic acid
- CAS Number: 1405-86-3 (α-D-Glucopyranosiduronic acid), 103000-77-7 (β-D-Glucopyranosiduronic acid)
- PubChem CID: 14982
- ChemSpider: 14263
- UNII: 6FO62043WK
- KEGG: D00157
- ChEBI: CHEBI:15939
- ChEMBL: ChEMBL441687
- E number: E958 (glazing agents, ...)
- CompTox Dashboard (EPA): DTXSID8047006
- ECHA InfoCard: 100.014.350

Chemical and physical data
- Formula: C_{42}H_{62}O_{16}
- Molar mass: 822.942 g·mol^{−1}
- 3D model (JSmol): Interactive image
- Solubility in water: 1–10 mg/mL (20 °C)
- SMILES: O=C(O)[C@H]7O[C@@H](O[C@@H]6[C@@H](O)[C@H](O)[C@H](O[C@@H]6O[C@@H]2C(C)(C)[C@@H]3CC[C@@]1(C)[C@]5(C(=C/C(=O)[C@@H]1[C@@]3(C)CC2)\[C@@H]4C[C@](C(=O)O)(C)CC[C@]4(C)CC5)C)C(=O)O)[C@H](O)[C@@H](O)[C@@H]7O
- InChI: InChI=1S/C42H62O16/c1-37(2)21-8-11-42(7)31(20(43)16-18-19-17-39(4,36(53)54)13-12-38(19,3)14-15-41(18,42)6)40(21,5)10-9-22(37)55-35-30(26(47)25(46)29(57-35)33(51)52)58-34-27(48)23(44)24(45)28(56-34)32(49)50/h16,19,21-31,34-35,44-48H,8-15,17H2,1-7H3,(H,49,50)(H,51,52)(H,53,54)/t19-,21-,22-,23-,24-,25-,26-,27+,28-,29-,30+,31+,34-,35-,38+,39-,40-,41+,42+/m0/s1; Key:LPLVUJXQOOQHMX-QWBHMCJMSA-N

Glycyrrhizin (glycyrrhizic acid or glycyrrhizinic acid) is the chief sweet-tasting constituent of Glycyrrhiza glabra (liquorice) root. Structurally, it is a saponin used as an emulsifier and gel-forming agent in foodstuffs and cosmetics. Its aglycone is enoxolone.

== Pharmacokinetics ==
After oral ingestion, glycyrrhizin is hydrolysed to 18β-glycyrrhetinic acid (enoxolone) by intestinal bacteria. After absorption from the gut, 18β-glycyrrhetinic acid is metabolised to 3β-monoglucuronyl-18β-glycyrrhetinic acid in the liver. This metabolite circulates in the bloodstream. Consequently, its oral bioavailability is poor. Most of it is eliminated by bile and only a minor part (0.31–0.67%) by urine. After oral ingestion of 600 mg of glycyrrhizin the metabolite appeared in urine after 1.5 to 14 hours. Maximal concentrations (0.49 to 2.69 mg/L) were achieved after 1.5 to 39 hours and metabolite can be detected in the urine after 2 to 4 days.

== Flavouring properties ==
Glycyrrhizin is obtained as an extract from licorice root after maceration and boiling in water. Licorice extract (glycyrrhizin) is sold in the United States as a liquid, paste, or spray-dried powder. When in specified amounts, it is approved for use as a flavor and aroma in manufactured foods, beverages, candies, dietary supplements, and seasonings. It is 30 to 50 times as sweet as sucrose (table sugar).

== Adverse effects ==
The most widely reported side effect of glycyrrhizin use via consumption of black liquorice is reduction of blood potassium levels, which can affect body fluid balance and function of nerves. Chronic consumption of black licorice, even in moderate amounts, is associated with an increase in blood pressure, may cause irregular heart rhythm, and may have adverse interactions with prescription drugs. In extreme cases, death can occur as a result of excess consumption.

== See also ==
- 11α-Hydroxyprogesterone
- Glycyrrhetinic acid
- List of unusual deaths in the 21st century
