= Admilparant =

Chemical compound

Clinical data
- Other names: BMS-986278

Identifiers
- IUPAC name: (1S,3S)-3-[2-methyl-6-[1-methyl-5-[[methyl(propyl)carbamoyl]oxymethyl]triazol-4-yl]pyridin-3-yl]oxycyclohexane-1-carboxylic acid
- CAS Number: 2170126-74-4
- PubChem CID: 132232205
- DrugBank: DB18011
- ChemSpider: 115009679
- UNII: 4UN9AOU6G8
- KEGG: D12657
- ChEMBL: ChEMBL5087506

Chemical and physical data
- Formula: C_{22}H_{31}N_{5}O_{5}
- Molar mass: 445.520 g·mol^{−1}
- 3D model (JSmol): Interactive image
- SMILES: CCCN(C)C(=O)OCC1=C(N=NN1C)C2=NC(=C(C=C2)O[C@H]3CCC[C@@H](C3)C(=O)O)C
- InChI: InChI=InChI=1S/C22H31N5O5/c1-5-11-26(3)22(30)31-13-18-20(24-25-27(18)4)17-9-10-19(14(2)23-17)32-16-8-6-7-15(12-16)21(28)29/h9-10,15-16H,5-8,11-13H2,1-4H3,(H,28,29)/t15-,16-/m0/s1; Key:UEUNDURNLYLSNB-HOTGVXAUSA-N

Admilparant is an investigational new drug being developed by Bristol-Myers Squibb for the treatment of idiopathic pulmonary fibrosis (IPF) and progressive pulmonary fibrosis (PPF). It is a first-in-class lysophosphatidic acid receptor 1 (LPA1) antagonist.

As of 2024, admilparant is in Phase III clinical trials for both IPF and PPF.
