= Cannabinoid receptor 1 =

Mammalian protein found in humans

CNR1
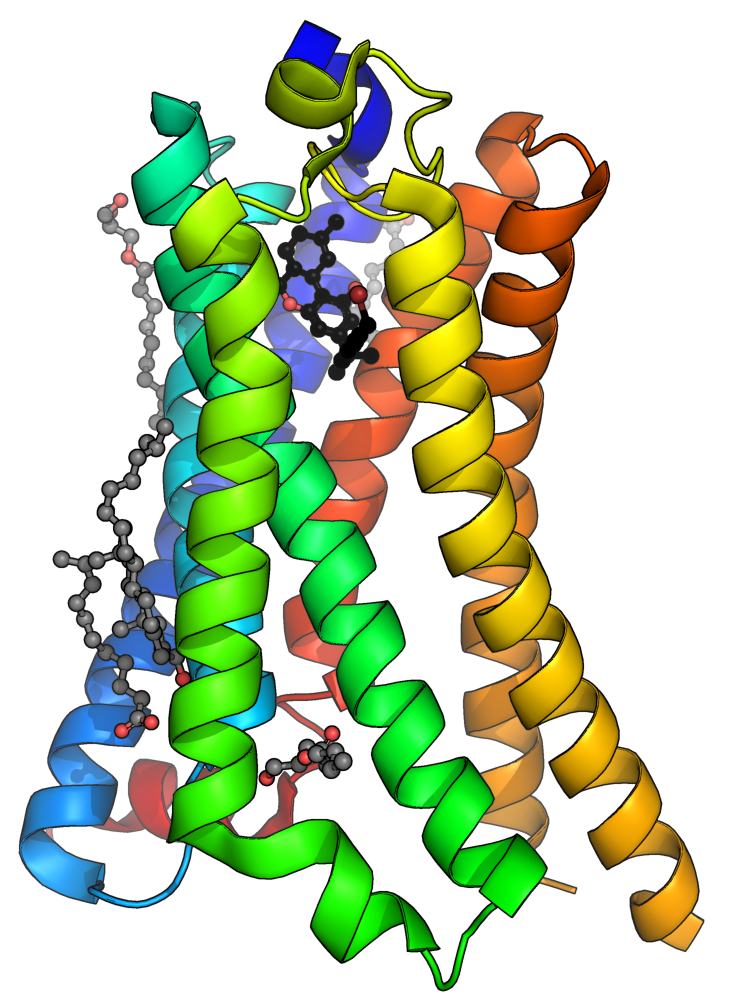

Identifiers
- Aliases: CNR1, CANN6, CB-R, CB1, CB1A, CB1K5, CB1R, CNR, cannabinoid receptor 1 (brain), cannabinoid receptor 1, cannabinoid CB1 receptor gene
- External IDs: OMIM: 114610; MGI: 104615; GeneCards: CNR1
Available structures
PDB	Ortholog search: PDBe RCSB
PDB	List of PDB id codes 1LVQ, 1LVR, 2B0Y, 2KOE, 2MZ3, 2MZ2, 2MZA,%%s1LVQ, 1LVR, 2B0Y, 2KOE

Gene location (Human)
Chr.	Chromosome 6 (human)
Band	6q15	Start	88,139,864 bp
Band	6q15	End	88,166,347 bp

Gene location (Mouse)
Chr.	Chromosome 4 (mouse)
Band	4 A5|4 16.28 cM	Start	33,924,593 bp
Band	4 A5|4 16.28 cM	End	33,948,831 bp
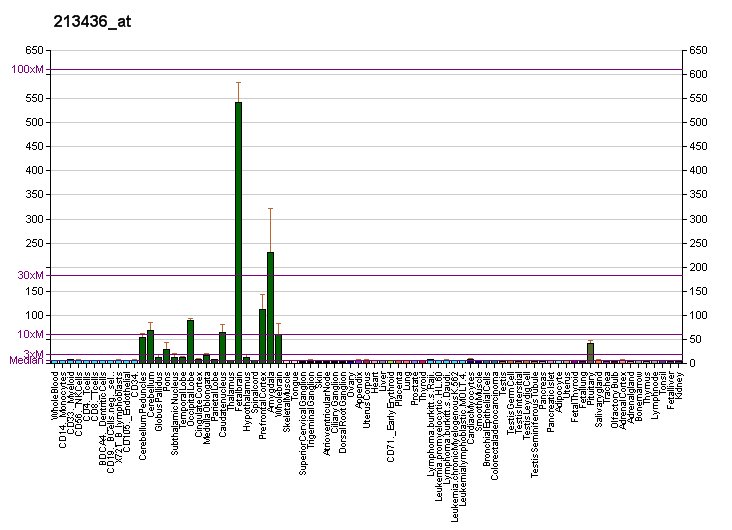
RNA expression pattern
Bgee	Human / Mouse (ortholog); Top expressed in: ganglionic eminence; ventricular zone; decidua; cerebellar vermis; paraflocculus of cerebellum; frontal pole; Region I of hippocampus proper; Brodmann area 10; Brodmann area 23; endothelial cell / Top expressed in: lobe of cerebellum; cerebellar vermis; subiculum; ventromedial nucleus; lateral hypothalamus; anterior amygdaloid area; dentate gyrus of hippocampal formation granule cell; lateral septal nucleus; superior frontal gyrus; deep cerebellar nuclei; More reference expression data
BioGPS	More reference expression data
Gene ontology
Molecular function	G protein-coupled receptor activity; signal transducer activity; cannabinoid receptor activity; protein binding; voltage-gated calcium channel activity involved in positive regulation of presynaptic cytosolic calcium levels
Cellular component	integral component of membrane; intracellular membrane-bounded organelle; membrane; growth cone; integral component of plasma membrane; axon; membrane raft; plasma membrane; presynaptic membrane; mitochondrion; mitochondrial outer membrane; cell projection; integral component of mitochondrial membrane; presynapse; glutamatergic synapse; GABA-ergic synapse; integral component of presynaptic membrane
Biological process	negative regulation of nitric-oxide synthase activity; negative regulation of mast cell activation; glucose homeostasis; response to nutrient; regulation of insulin secretion; negative regulation of blood pressure; adenylate cyclase-modulating G protein-coupled receptor signaling pathway; maternal process involved in female pregnancy; G protein-coupled receptor signaling pathway, coupled to cyclic nucleotide second messenger; response to nicotine; ageing; positive regulation of fever generation; memory; negative regulation of action potential; regulation of feeding behavior; negative regulation of ion transport; response to morphine; negative regulation of fatty acid beta-oxidation; response to lipopolysaccharide; positive regulation of blood pressure; regulation of penile erection; regulation of lipid metabolic process; spermatogenesis; positive regulation of neuron projection development; positive regulation of apoptotic process; positive regulation of acute inflammatory response to antigenic stimulus; learning or memory; sensory perception of pain; negative regulation of dopamine secretion; regulation of synaptic transmission, glutamatergic; response to ethanol; axonal fasciculation; regulation of synaptic transmission, GABAergic; signal transduction; response to cocaine; trans-synaptic signaling by endocannabinoid, modulating synaptic transmission; G protein-coupled receptor signaling pathway; cannabinoid signaling pathway; retrograde trans-synaptic signaling by endocannabinoid; positive regulation of presynaptic cytosolic calcium concentration; induction of synaptic vesicle exocytosis by positive regulation of presynaptic cytosolic calcium ion concentration
Sources:Amigo / QuickGO
Orthologs
Databases	NCBI: entry; OMA: entry
Species	Human	Mouse
Entrez	1268	12801
Ensembl	ENSG00000118432	ENSMUSG00000044288
UniProt	P21554	P47746
RefSeq (mRNA)	NM_001160226; NM_001160258; NM_001160259; NM_001160260; NM_016083 NM_033181; NM_001365869; NM_001365870; NM_001365872; NM_001365874; NM_001370545; NM_001370546; NM_001370547	NM_007726; NM_001355020; NM_001355021; NM_001365881
RefSeq (protein)	NP_001153698; NP_001153730; NP_001153731; NP_057167; NP_149421 NP_001352798; NP_001352799; NP_001352801; NP_001352803; NP_001357474; NP_001357475; NP_001357476	NP_031752; NP_001341949; NP_001341950; NP_001352810
Location (UCSC)	Chr 6: 88.14 – 88.17 Mb	Chr 4: 33.92 – 33.95 Mb
PubMed search
- Wikidata
View/Edit Human	View/Edit Mouse

Cannabinoid receptor 1 (CB_{1}), is a G protein-coupled cannabinoid receptor that in humans is encoded by the CNR1 gene. It was discovered by determination and characterization in 1988, and cloned in 1990 for the first time. The human CB_{1} receptor is expressed in the peripheral nervous system and central nervous system. It is activated by endogenous cannabinoids called endocannabinoids, a group of retrograde neurotransmitters that include lipids, such as anandamide and 2-arachidonoylglycerol; plant phytocannabinoids, such as docosatetraenoylethanolamide found in wild dagga, the compound tetrahydrocannabinol which is an active constituent of the psychoactive drug cannabis; and synthetic analogs of tetrahydrocannabinol. CB_{1} is antagonized by the phytocannabinoid tetrahydrocannabivarin at low doses and at higher doses, it activates the CB_{1} receptor as an agonist, but with less potency than tetrahydrocannabinol.

The primary endogenous agonist of the human CB_{1} receptor is anandamide.

== Structure ==
The CB_{1} receptor shares the structure characteristic of all G-protein-coupled receptors, possessing seven transmembrane domains connected by three extracellular and three intracellular loops, an extracellular N-terminal tail, and an intracellular C-terminal tail. The receptor may exist as a homodimer or form heterodimers or other GPCR oligomers with different classes of G-protein-coupled receptors. Observed heterodimers include A_{2A}–CB_{1}, CB_{1}–D2, OX_{1}–CB_{1}, μOR–CB_{1,} while many more may only be stable enough to exist in vivo. The CB_{1} receptor possesses an allosteric modulatory binding site.

The CB_{1} receptor is encoded by the gene CNR1, located on human chromosome 6. Two transcript variants encoding different isoforms have been described for this gene. CNR1 orthologs have been identified in most mammals.

The CNR1 gene has a structure consisting of a single coding-exon and multiple alternative 5' untranslated exons. The CB_{1} receptor is created by transcription of the last exon on the CNR1 gene.

== Mechanism ==
The CB_{1} receptor is a pre-synaptic heteroreceptor that modulates neurotransmitter release when activated in a dose-dependent, stereoselective and pertussis toxin-sensitive manner. The CB_{1} receptor is activated by cannabinoids, generated naturally inside the body (endocannabinoids) or exogenously, normally through cannabis or a related synthetic compound.

Research suggests that the majority of CB_{1} receptors are coupled through G_{i/o} proteins. Upon activation, CB_{1} receptor exhibits its effects mainly through activation of G_{i}, which decreases intracellular cAMP concentration by inhibiting its production enzyme, adenylate cyclase, and increases mitogen-activated protein kinase (MAP kinase) concentration. Alternatively, in some rare cases CB_{1} receptor activation may be coupled to G_{s} proteins, which stimulate adenylate cyclase. cAMP is known to serve as a second messenger coupled to a variety of ion channels, including the positively influenced inwardly rectifying potassium channels (=Kir or IRK), and calcium channels, which are activated by cAMP-dependent interaction with such molecules as protein kinase A (PKA), protein kinase C (PKC), Raf-1, ERK, JNK, p38, c-fos, c-jun, and others.

In terms of function, the inhibition of intracellular cAMP expression shortens the duration of pre-synaptic action potentials by prolonging the rectifying potassium A-type currents, which is normally inactivated upon phosphorylation by PKA. This inhibition grows more pronounced when considered with the effect of activated CB_{1} receptors to limit calcium entry into the cell, which does not occur through cAMP but by a direct G-protein-mediated inhibition. As presynaptic calcium entry is a requirement for vesicle release, this function will decrease the transmitter that enters the synapse upon release. The relative contribution of each of these two inhibitory mechanisms depends on the variance of ion channel expression by cell type.

The CB_{1} receptor can also be allosterically modulated by synthetic ligands in a positive and negative manner. In vivo exposure to tetrahydrocannabinol impairs long-term potentiation and leads to a reduction of phosphorylated CREB.

The signaling properties of activated CB_{1} are furthermore modified by the presence of SGIP1, that hinders receptor internalization and decreases ERK1/2 signalling while augmenting the interaction with GRK3, β-arrestin-2.

In summary, CB_{1} receptor activity has been found to be coupled to certain ion channels, in the following manner:

- Positively to inwardly rectifying and A-type outward potassium channels.
- Negatively to D-type outward potassium channels
- Negatively to N-type and P/Q-type calcium channels.

== Expression ==
CB_{1} receptors are localized throughout the central and peripheral nervous systems, particularly on axon terminals in the cerebellum, hippocampus, basal ganglia, frontal cortex, amygdala, hypothalamus, and midbrain. The CB_{1} receptor is primarily expressed in the presynaptic terminals of GABAergic (amygdala and cerebellum), glutamatergic (cortex, hippocampus and amygdala), dopaminergic, GABAergic interneurons, cholinergic neurons, noradrenergic, and serotonergic neurons. Acting as a neuromodulator, the CB_{1} receptor inhibits the release of both excitatory and inhibitory neurotransmitters including acetylcholine, glutamate, GABA, noradrenaline, 5-HT, dopamine, D-aspartate, and cholecystokinin. Repeated administration of receptor agonists may result in receptor internalization or a reduction in receptor protein signaling.

The inverse agonist MK-9470 makes it possible to produce in vivo images of the distribution of CB_{1} receptors in the human brain with positron emission tomography.

=== Brain ===
The CB_{1} receptor is recognized as the most abundant metabotropic receptor in the brain. CB_{1} receptors are found moderately to highly expressed within the cerebral cortex (cingulate gyrus, prefrontal cortex, and hippocampus), periaqueductal gray, hypothalamus, amygdala, cerebellum, and basal ganglia (globus pallidus, substantia nigra). Varying levels of CB_{1} can also be detected in the olfactory bulb, cortical regions (neocortex, pyriform cortex), parts of basal ganglia, thalamic, hypothalamic, and brainstem nuclei, as well as in subcortical regions (e.g., the septal region), and cerebellar cortex.

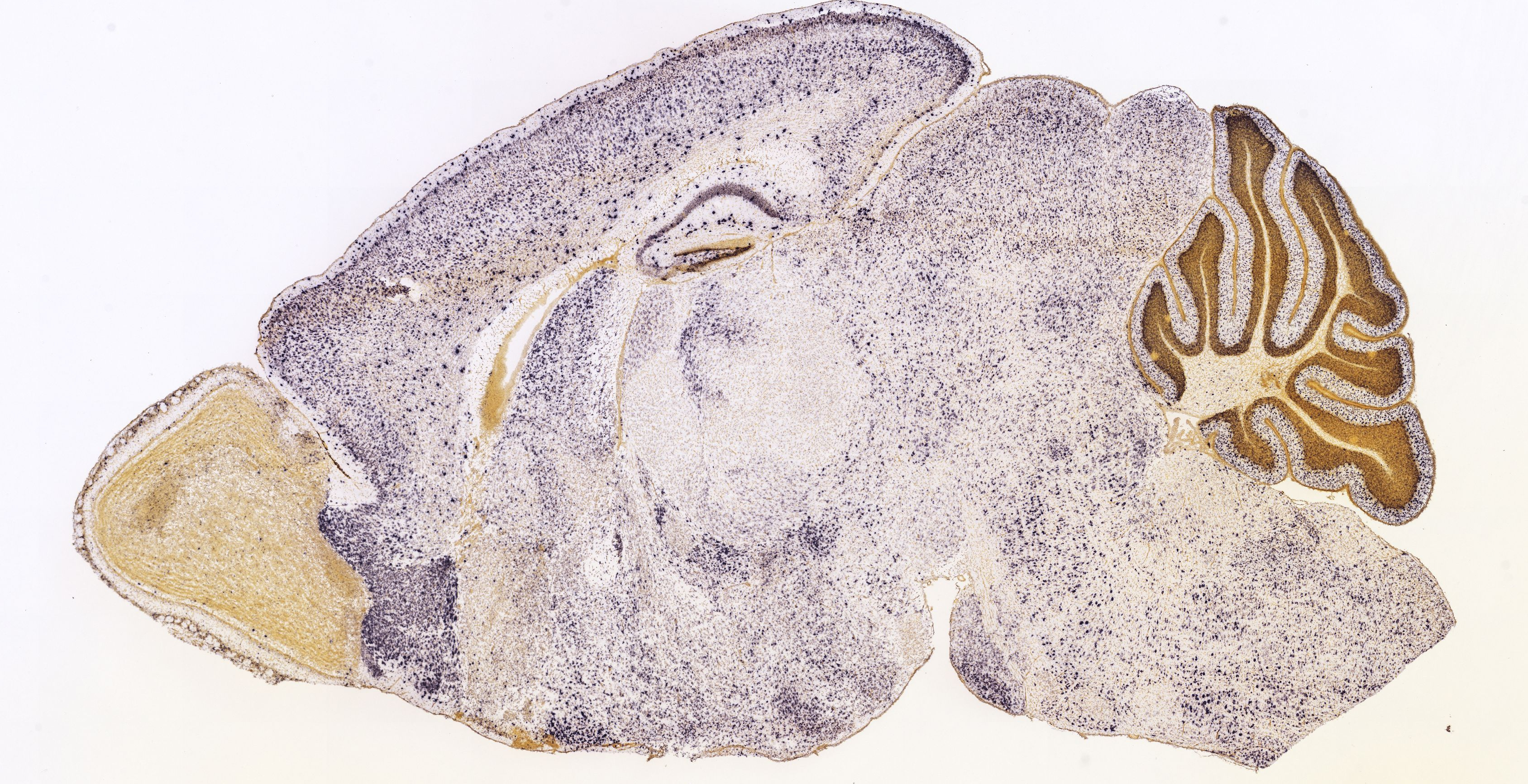
Cnr1 is widely expressed in all major regions of the postnatal day 14 mouse brain, but is conspicuously absent in much of the thalamus.

CB_{1} receptors are expressed most densely in the central nervous system and are largely responsible for mediating the effects of cannabinoid binding in the brain. Endocannabinoids released by a depolarizing neuron bind to CB_{1} receptors on pre-synaptic glutamatergic and GABAergic neurons, resulting in a respective decrease in either glutamate or GABA release. Limiting glutamate release causes reduced excitation, while limiting GABA release suppresses inhibition, a common form of short-term plasticity in which the depolarization of a single neuron induces a reduction in GABA-mediated inhibition, in effect exciting the postsynaptic cell.

==== Brainstem ====
High expression of CB_{1} is found in brainstem medullary nuclei, including the nucleus of the solitary tract and area postrema. CB_{1} receptor is relatively low in medullary respiratory brainstem control centers.

==== Hippocampal formation ====
CB_{1} mRNA transcripts are abundant in GABAergic interneurons of the hippocampus, indirectly reflecting the expression of these receptors and elucidating the established effect of cannabinoids on memory. These receptors are densely located in cornu ammonis pyramidal cells, which are known to release glutamate. Cannabinoids suppress the induction of LTP and LTD in the hippocampus by inhibiting these glutamatergic neurons. By reducing the concentration of glutamate released below the threshold necessary to depolarize the postsynaptic NMDA receptor, a receptor known to be directly related to the induction of LTP and LTD, cannabinoids are a crucial factor in the selectivity of memory. These receptors are highly expressed by GABAergic interneurons as well as glutamatergic principal neurons. However, a higher density is found within GABAergic cells. This means that, although synaptic strength/frequency, and thus potential to induce LTP, is lowered, net hippocampal activity is raised. In addition, CB_{1} receptors in the hippocampus indirectly inhibit the release of acetylcholine. This serves as the modulatory axis opposing GABA, decreasing neurotransmitter release. Cannabinoids also likely play an important role in the development of memory through their neonatal promotion of myelin formation, and thus the individual segregation of axons.

==== Basal ganglia ====
CB_{1} receptors are expressed throughout the basal ganglia and have well-established effects on movement in rodents. As in the hippocampus, these receptors inhibit the release of glutamate or GABA transmitter, resulting in decreased excitation or reduced inhibition based on the cell they are expressed in. Consistent with the variable expression of both excitatory glutamate and inhibitory GABA interneurons in both the basal ganglia's direct and indirect motor loops, synthetic cannabinoids are known to influence this system in a dose-dependent triphasic pattern. Decreased locomotor activity is seen at both higher and lower concentrations of applied cannabinoids, whereas an enhancement of movement may occur upon moderate dosages. However, these dose-dependent effects have been studied predominately in rodents, and the physiological basis for this triphasic pattern warrants future research in humans. Effects may vary based on the site of cannabinoid application, input from higher cortical centers, and whether drug application is unilateral or bilateral.

==== Cerebellum and neocortex ====
The role of the CB_{1} receptor in the regulation of motor movements is complicated by the additional expression of this receptor in the cerebellum and neocortex, two regions associated with the coordination and initiation of movement. Research suggests that anandamide is synthesized by Purkinje cells and acts on presynaptic receptors to inhibit glutamate release from granule cells or GABA release from the terminals of basket cells. In the neocortex, these receptors are concentrated on local interneurons in cerebral layers II-III and V-VI. Compared to rat brains, humans express more CB_{1} receptors in the cerebral cortex and amygdala and less in the cerebellum, which may help explain why motor function seems to be more compromised in rats than humans upon cannabinoid application.

=== Spine ===
Many of the documented analgesic effects of cannabinoids are based on the interaction of these compounds with CB_{1} receptors on spinal cord interneurons in the superficial levels of the dorsal horn, known for its role in nociceptive processing. In particular, the CB_{1} is heavily expressed in layers 1 and 2 of the spinal cord dorsal horn and in lamina 10 by the central canal. Dorsal root ganglion also express these receptors, which target a variety of peripheral terminals involved in nociception. Signals on this track are also transmitted to the periaqueductal gray (PAG) of the midbrain. Endogenous cannabinoids are believed to exhibit an analgesic effect on these receptors by limiting both GABA and glutamate of PAG cells that relate to nociceptive input processing, a hypothesis consistent with the finding that anandamide release in the PAG is increased in response to pain-triggering stimuli.

=== Other ===
CB_{1} is expressed on several types of cells in pituitary gland, thyroid gland, and possibly in the adrenal gland. CB_{1} is also expressed in several cells relating to metabolism, such as fat cells, muscle cells, liver cells (and also in the endothelial cells, Kupffer cells, and stellate cells of the liver), and in the digestive tract. It is also expressed in the lungs and the kidney.

CB_{1} is present on Leydig cells and human sperms. In females, it is present in the ovaries, oviducts myometrium, decidua, and placenta. It has also been implicated in the proper development of the embryo.

CB_{1} is also expressed in the retina. In the retina, they are expressed in the photoreceptors, inner plexiform, outer plexiform, bipolar cells, ganglion cells, and retinal pigment epithelium cells. In the visual system, cannabinoids agonist induce a dose dependent modulation of calcium, chloride and potassium channels. This alters vertical transmission between photoreceptor, bipolar and ganglion cells. Altering vertical transmission in turn results in the way vision is perceived.

== Physiological and pathological conditions ==
The activation of CB_{1} in the human body generally inhibits neurotransmitter release, controls pain, regulates metabolism, and monitors the cardiovascular system. CB_{1} receptors are implicated in a number of physiological processes related to the central nervous system (CNS) including brain development, learning and memory, motor behavior, regulation of appetite, body temperature, pain perception, and inflammation.

The localization of CB_{1} receptors is expressed in several neuronal types, including GABAergic, glutamatergic, and serotonergic neurons. CB_{1} receptors localized in GABAergic neurons can modulate food intake, learning and memory processes, drug addiction, and related behaviors. CB_{1} receptors localized in glutamatergic neurons are capable of mediating olfactory processes, neuroprotection, social behaviors, anxiety, and fear memories. The localization of CB_{1} receptors in serotonergic neurons can regulate emotional responses.

Clinically, CB_{1} is a direct drug target for addiction, pain, epilepsy, and obesity. CB_{1} receptor function is involved with several psychiatric, neurological, neurodevelopmental, and neurodegenerative disorders including Huntington's disease (HD), multiple sclerosis (MS), and Alzheimer's disease (AD). Major loss of CB_{1} receptors is reported in patients with HD. However, stimulation of the CB_{1} receptor has potential to reduce the progression of HD. Improvements from use of CB agonist in MS are associated with the activation of CB_{1} and CB_{2} receptors, leading to dual anti-inflammatory and neuroprotective effects throughout the CNS. Similarly, activation of CB_{1} and CB_{2} receptors could provide neuroprotective effects against amyloid-β (Aβ) toxicity in AD. In several brain regions, including the dorsolateral prefrontal cortex (DLPFC) and hippocampus, dysregulation of the CB_{1} receptor is implicated in the development of schizophrenia. Abnormal functioning of the CB_{1} receptor compromises intricate neural systems that are responsible for controlling cognition and memory, which contributes to the pathology. PET imaging modalities implicate that alterations of CB_{1} levels in certain brain systems are strongly associated with schizophrenia symptoms. Neurobehavioral disorders, such as attention deficit hyperactivity disorder (ADHD), are associated with genetic variants of CNR1 in rat models of ADHD.

== Use of antagonists ==
Selective CB_{1} agonists may be used to isolate the effects of the receptor from the CB_{2} receptor, as most cannabinoids and endocannabinoids bind to both receptor types. CB_{1} selective antagonists such as rimonabant are used for weight reduction and smoking cessation. A substantial number of antagonists of the CB_{1} receptor have been discovered and characterized. TM38837 has been developed as a CB_{1} receptor antagonist that is restricted to targeting only peripheral CB_{1} receptors.

== Ligands ==
=== Agonists ===
- Minocycline
- Dronabinol
- AM404

==== Selective ====
- Epigallocatechin
- Epicatechin
- Kavain
- Yangonin
- Oleamide

==== Unspecified efficacy ====
- N-Arachidonoyl dopamine
- Cannabinol
- HU-210
- 11-Hydroxy-THC
- Levonantradol

==== Partial ====
===== Endogenous =====
- 2-Arachidonyl glyceryl ether

===== Phyto =====
- Tetrahydrocannabinol
- Hexahydrocannabinol

==== Full ====
===== Endogenous =====
- 2-Arachidonoylglycerol

===== Synthetic =====
- JWH-073
- AM-2201
- CP 55,940
- JWH-018
- WIN 55,212-2

==== Allosteric agonist ====
- GAT228

=== Antagonists ===
- Cannabigerol
- Ibipinabant
- Otenabant
- Tetrahydrocannabivarin
- Virodhamine (Endogenous CB_{1} antagonist and CB_{2} agonist)

=== Inverse agonists ===
- Rimonabant
- Taranabant
- Zevaquenabant
- Monlunabant
- INV-202

=== Allosteric modulators ===
- Lipoxin A4 – endogenous, PAM
- ZCZ-011 – PAM
- Pregnenolone – endogenous, NAM
- Cannabidiol – NAM
- Fenofibrate – NAM
- GAT100 – NAM
- PSNCBAM-1 – NAM
- RVD-Hpα – NAM

== Binding affinities ==
	CB_{1} affinity (K_{i})	Efficacy towards CB_{1}	CB_{2} affinity (K_{i})	Efficacy towards CB_{2}	Type	References
Anandamide	78 nM	Partial agonist	370 nM	Partial agonist	Endogenous	
N-Arachidonoyl dopamine	250 nM	Agonist	12000 nM	?	Endogenous	
2-Arachidonoylglycerol	58.3 nM	Full agonist	145 nM	Full agonist	Endogenous	
2-Arachidonyl glyceryl ether	21 nM	Full agonist	480 nM	Full agonist	Endogenous	
Tetrahydrocannabinol	10 nM	Partial agonist	24 nM	Partial agonist	Phytogenic	
EGCG	33600 nM	Agonist	50000+ nM	?	Phytogenic	
AM-1221	52.3 nM	Agonist	0.28 nM	Agonist	Synthetic	
AM-1235	1.5 nM	Agonist	20.4 nM	Agonist	Synthetic	
AM-2232	0.28 nM	Agonist	1.48 nM	Agonist	Synthetic	
UR-144	150 nM	Full agonist	1.8 nM	Full agonist	Synthetic	
JWH-007	9.0 nM	Agonist	2.94 nM	Agonist	Synthetic	
JWH-015	383 nM	Agonist	13.8 nM	Agonist	Synthetic	
JWH-018	9.00 ± 5.00 nM	Full agonist	2.94 ± 2.65 nM	Full agonist	Synthetic	

== Evolution ==
The CNR1 gene is used in animals as a nuclear DNA phylogenetic marker. This intronless gene has first been used to explore the phylogeny of the major groups of mammals, and contributed to reveal that placental orders are distributed into five major clades: Xenarthra, Afrotheria, Laurasiatheria, Euarchonta, and Glires. CNR1 has also proven useful at lower taxonomic levels, such as rodents, and for the identification of dermopterans as the closest primate relatives.

=== paralogues ===
- CNR2
- S1PR1
- LPAR1
- S1PR3
- S1PR5
- S1PR2
- GPR6
- GPR12
- S1PR4
- LPAR3
- LPAR2
- GPR3
- MC3R
- MC5R
- MC2R
- MC1R
- MC4R
- GPR119

== See also ==
- Discovery and development of Cannabinoid Receptor 1 Antagonists
- Cannabinoid receptor
- Cannabinoid receptor type 2 (CB_{2})
