= GPR6 =

Protein-coding gene in the species Homo sapiens

Identifiers
- Aliases: GPR6, G protein-coupled receptor 6
- External IDs: OMIM: 600553; MGI: 2155249; GeneCards: GPR6

Gene location (Human)
| Chr. | Chromosome 6 (human) |
| Band | 6q21 | Start | 109,978,256 bp |
| Band | 6q21 | End | 109,980,720 bp |

Gene location (Mouse)
| Chr. | Chromosome 10 (mouse) |
| Band | 10 B1|10 22.08 cM | Start | 40,945,973 bp |
| Band | 10 B1|10 22.08 cM | End | 40,948,281 bp |
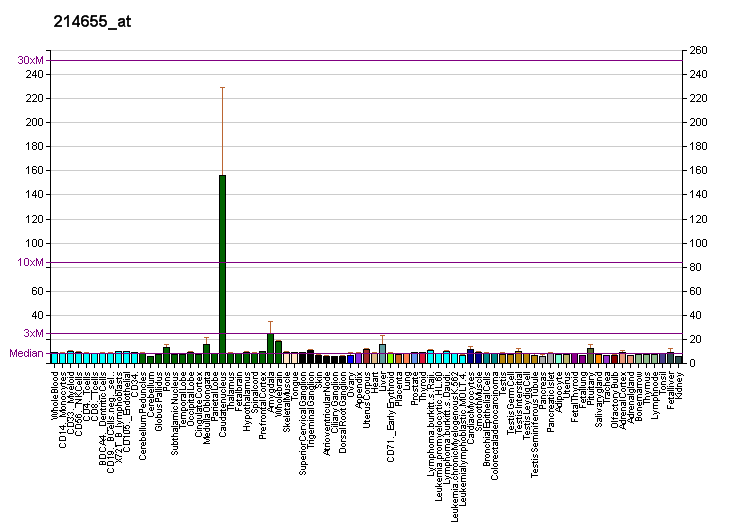
RNA expression pattern
| Bgee | Human / Mouse (ortholog); Top expressed in: nucleus accumbens; putamen; caudate nucleus; middle frontal gyrus; endothelial cell; middle temporal gyrus; Brodmann area 23; external globus pallidus; pituitary gland; entorhinal cortex / Top expressed in: dorsal striatum; olfactory tubercle; nucleus accumbens; globus pallidus; superior frontal gyrus; temporal lobe; amygdala; mammillary body; ventromedial nucleus; nucleus of stria terminalis; More reference expression data |
| BioGPS | More reference expression data |
Gene ontology
| Molecular function | sphingosine-1-phosphate receptor activity; G protein-coupled receptor activity; signal transducer activity |
| Cellular component | integral component of membrane; plasma membrane; integral component of plasma membrane; membrane |
| Biological process | positive regulation of cytosolic calcium ion concentration; G protein-coupled receptor signaling pathway; sphingosine-1-phosphate receptor signaling pathway; signal transduction |
Sources:Amigo / QuickGO
Orthologs
| Databases | NCBI: entry; OMA: entry |
| Species | Human | Mouse |
| Entrez | 2830 | 140741 |
| Ensembl | ENSG00000146360 | ENSMUSG00000046922 |
| UniProt | P46095 | Q6YNI2 |
| RefSeq (mRNA) | NM_005284; NM_001286099 | NM_199058 |
| RefSeq (protein) | NP_001273028; NP_005275 | NP_951013 |
| Location (UCSC) | Chr 6: 109.98 – 109.98 Mb | Chr 10: 40.95 – 40.95 Mb |
| PubMed search |
- Wikidata
| View/Edit Human | View/Edit Mouse |

G protein-coupled receptor 6, also known as GPR6, is a protein which in humans is encoded by the GPR6 gene.

== Function ==
GPR6 is a member of the G protein-coupled receptor family of transmembrane receptors. It has been reported that GPR6 is both constitutively active. It was previously thought to also act as a sphingosine-1-phosphate receptor, but this was found to not be the case in later research.

GPR6 up-regulates cyclic AMP levels and promotes neurite outgrowth.

== Ligand ==
=== Inverse Agonist ===
- Cannabidiol
- Solengepras (solangepras; CVN-424)

== Evolution ==
=== Paralogues to GPR6 gene ===
- GPR3
- GPR12
- S1PR5
- S1PR1
- CNR1
- S1PR2
- LPAR2
- CNR2
- MC1R
- S1PR3
- S1PR4
- GPR119
- MC3R
- MC4R
- MC5R
- LPAR1
- LPAR3
- MC2R

== See also ==
- Lysophospholipid receptor
