= GPR3 =

Protein

Identifiers
- Aliases: GPR3, ACCA, G protein-coupled receptor 3
- External IDs: OMIM: 600241; MGI: 101908; GeneCards: GPR3

Gene location (Human)
Chr.	Chromosome 1 (human)
Band	1p36.11	Start	27,392,622 bp
Band	1p36.11	End	27,395,814 bp

Gene location (Mouse)
Chr.	Chromosome 4 (mouse)
Band	4|4 D2.3	Start	132,936,651 bp
Band	4|4 D2.3	End	132,939,847 bp
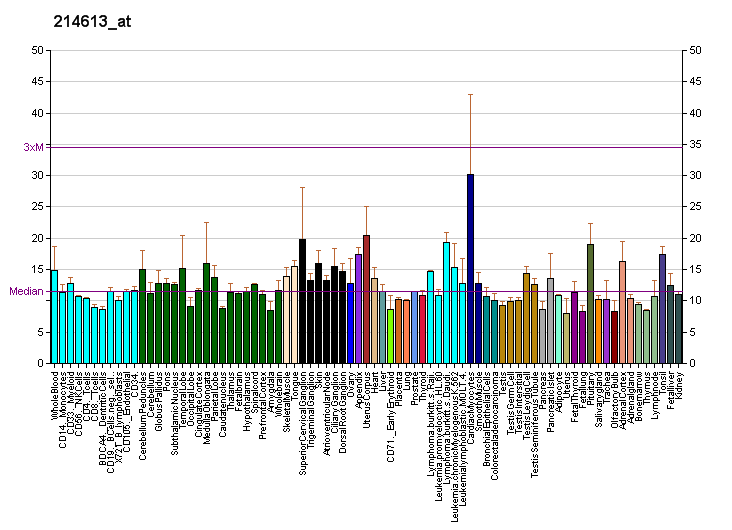
RNA expression pattern
Bgee	Human / Mouse (ortholog); Top expressed in: secondary oocyte; testicle; prefrontal cortex; cingulate gyrus; anterior cingulate cortex; right frontal lobe; right hemisphere of cerebellum; islet of Langerhans; primary visual cortex; right auricle of heart / Top expressed in: zygote; secondary oocyte; primary oocyte; facial motor nucleus; superior frontal gyrus; primary visual cortex; embryo; morula; morula; embryo; More reference expression data
BioGPS	More reference expression data
Gene ontology
Molecular function	G protein-coupled receptor activity; protein binding; signal transducer activity
Cellular component	integral component of membrane; plasma membrane; integral component of plasma membrane; membrane; intracellular anatomical structure
Biological process	G protein-coupled receptor signaling pathway; regulation of meiotic nuclear division; adenylate cyclase-activating G protein-coupled receptor signaling pathway; signal transduction; positive regulation of cold-induced thermogenesis
Sources:Amigo / QuickGO
Orthologs
Databases	NCBI: entry; OMA: entry
Species	Human	Mouse
Entrez	2827	14748
Ensembl	ENSG00000181773	ENSMUSG00000049649
UniProt	P46089	P35413
RefSeq (mRNA)	NM_005281	NM_008154
RefSeq (protein)	NP_005272	NP_032180
Location (UCSC)	Chr 1: 27.39 – 27.4 Mb	Chr 4: 132.94 – 132.94 Mb
PubMed search
- Wikidata
View/Edit Human	View/Edit Mouse

G-protein coupled receptor 3 is a protein that in humans is encoded by the GPR3 gene. The protein encoded by this gene is a member of the G protein-coupled receptor family of transmembrane receptors and is involved in signal transduction.

GPR3 mRNA is broadly expressed in neurons in various brain regions, including the cortex, thalamus, hypothalamus, amygdala, hippocampus, pituitary, and cerebellum. GPR3 mRNA is also expressed in the eye, lung, kidney, liver, testes, and ovary, among other tissues.

Individuals afflicted by Alzheimer's disease have in many cases, overexpression of the GPR3 protein in their neurons.

== Function ==
GPR3 activates adenylate cyclase in the absence of ligand. GPR3 was first described as a constitutive activator of adenylate cyclase. This constitutive activity could be due to stimulation by a ubiquitous ligand that may be free, membrane-bound, or membrane-derived. Alternatively, they propose that this could also be due to basal Gs coupling. Various groups have since supported this initial finding of GPR3 constitutive activation and have proceeded to show similar Gs activity in GPR6 and GPR12.

GPR3 is expressed in mammalian oocytes where it maintains meiotic arrest and is thought to be a communication link between oocytes and the surrounding somatic tissue. It has been proposed that sphingosine 1-phosphate (S1P) and sphingosylphosphorylcholine (SPC) are GPR3 ligands, however this result was not confirmed in a β-arrestin recruitment assay.

Mice lacking GPR3 were found to develop late-onset obesity owing to decreased UCP-1 expression in brown adipose tissue and reduced thermogenic capacity.

=== Brown adipose tissue Activation ===
Brown adipose tissue (BAT), in contrast to bona fide white fat, can dissipate significant amounts of chemical energy through uncoupled respiration and heat production (thermogenesis). Metabolic substrates are consumed to fuel mitochondrial futile cycles and uncoupling protein 1 (UCP1)-dependent respiration to ultimately convert chemical energy to heat. Gs-signaling stimulates the recruitment of thermogenically competent beige adipocytes in the subcutaneous adipose depots.

Exposure to environmental cold stimulates thermogenic catabolism of lipids and carbohydrates in brown adipose tissue (BAT).

BAT activation is predominantly ascribed to the Gs-coupled family, which signals through increased cyclic AMP (cAMP). This class is exemplified by the β-adrenergic receptors (ADRB1, ADRB2, and ADRB3), which represent the canonical means of sympathetic, ligand-mediated thermogenic control.

However, in the case of Gpr3, cold exposure increases the expression of this constitutively active receptor, which possesses innate signaling capacity and, thus, can modulate cAMP levels and thermogenic output without a ligand.

Gpr3 expression must be kept at extremely low basal levels until there is a thermogenic demand. Mimicking the cold induction of Gpr3 is then sufficient to drive and maintain elevated BAT activity even under conditions of little or no sympathetic tone.

To prove this, OS Johansen and colleagues developed a conditional gain-of-function model (Gpr3 TTG) for robust and sustained genetic manipulation of Gpr3 in vitro and in vivo.

Gpr3 TTG mice were crossed with mice to facilitate overexpression of Gpr3 in isolated primary brown and subcutaneous white adipocytes. Gpr3 overexpression significantly increased the expression of thermogenic genes, fatty acid uptake, and basal and leak mitochondrial respiration.

Gpr3 overexpression in their primary adipocyte model suppressed expression of the β-adrenergic receptors, further supporting a counter-regulatory interaction between GPR3 and other Gs-coupled receptors.

BAT-specific overexpression of Gpr3 (C-3BO) mice were completely protected from developing diet-induced obesity despite maintaining comparable levels of food intake, C-3BO mice maintained elevated whole-body energy expenditure as well as darker brown BAT depots and higher thermogenic gene expression.

=== Reproductive system ===
In mammalian oocytes, the process of meiotic arrest and meiotic maturation is controlled by in large part by cAMP concentrations in the cell. When cAMP levels in the cell decrease the process of miosis resumes and this precedes germinal vesicle breakdown. It is proposed That GPR3 is implicated in cAMP signaling in oocytes since it is consistent with the observation that their mRNA expression is reduced when cAMP is chronically increased in oocytes. The constitutive activity of these receptors is sufficient to prevent maturation in mouse oocytes, it is shown that their activity is also sufficient for maintaining the meiotic arrest in the follicle.

=== Brain cells ===
GPR3 mRNA is broadly expressed in neurons in various brain regions, including the cortex, thalamus, hypothalamus, amygdala, hippocampus, pituitary, and cerebellum. Notably, the GPR3 protein is overexpressed in neurons in post-mortem brain tissue sections from individuals afflicted by Alzheimer's disease. In a study on mice with Alzheimer's disease, it was shown that the disruption of the expression of GPR3 has affected the overgrowth of amyloid plaque on neurons, helping symptoms of Alzheimer's disease.

In the medial habenula, GPR3 is expressed in cells which have nicotinic acetylcholine receptors (nAChR) and has been studied for a potential role in regulating nicotine consumption in a mouse model.

== Ligands ==
GPR3 is largely known as an orphan G protein-coupled receptor. Even though it does not have any endogenous ligands there is research being conducted to find non-endogenous agonists for the receptor.

=== Agonists ===
==== Sphingosine 1-phosphate ====
The molecule Sphingosine 1-phosphate (S1P) is a signaling lipid that exists in the extracellular plasma, its synthesis is catalysed by sphingosine kinases (SphKs). The molecule is reported to have high affinity to the GPR3 receptor. The proposed ligand activates the Gs signaling pathway in oocytes.

==== Diphenyleneiodonium chloride ====
Diphenyleneiodonium chloride (DPI) is an inhibitor of NADPH oxidase and a potent, irreversible, and time and temperature-dependent iNOS/eNOS inhibitor. Diphenyleneiodonium chloride (DPI) also functions as a TRPA1 activator and selectively inhibits intracellular reactive oxygen species (ROS). Diphenyleneiodonium chloride (DPI) was identified as a novel agonist of GPR3 with weak or no cross-reactivity with other GPCRs. DPI was further characterized to activate several GPR3-mediated signal transduction pathways, including Ca(2+) mobilization, cAMP accumulation, membrane recruitment of β-arrestin2, and receptor desensitization.

=== Inverse agonists ===
==== Cannabidiol ====
Cannabidiol (CBD) is a Phyto-cannabinoid found in the cannabis plant. This compound is connected to improving anxiety, cognition, and pain. Although it is orphan, GPR3 is phylogenetically most closely related to the cannabinoid receptors. Using β-arrestin2 recruitment and cAMP accumulation assays, it was recently found that cannabidiol is an inverse agonist for GPR3. The affects that the inverse agonist has are still unknown.

== Evolution ==
The following proteins are Paralogues of GPR3:

- GPR6
- GPR12
- S1PR5
- LPAR2
- S1PR1
- S1PR2
- LPAR3
- LPAR1
- CNR1
- S1PR3
- MC3R
- MC4R
- S1PR4
- MC5R
- MC1R
- CNR2
- MC2R
- GPR119
