= Melanocortin 3 receptor =

Mammalian protein found in humans

MC3R

Identifiers
- Aliases: MC3R, BMIQ9, MC3, MC3-R, OB20, OQTL, Melanocortin 3 receptor
- External IDs: OMIM: 155540; MGI: 96929; GeneCards: MC3R

Gene location (Human)
Chr.	Chromosome 20 (human)
Band	20q13.2	Start	56,248,732 bp
Band	20q13.2	End	56,249,815 bp

Gene location (Mouse)
Chr.	Chromosome 2 (mouse)
Band	2 H3|2 94.8 cM	Start	172,090,412 bp
Band	2 H3|2 94.8 cM	End	172,093,034 bp
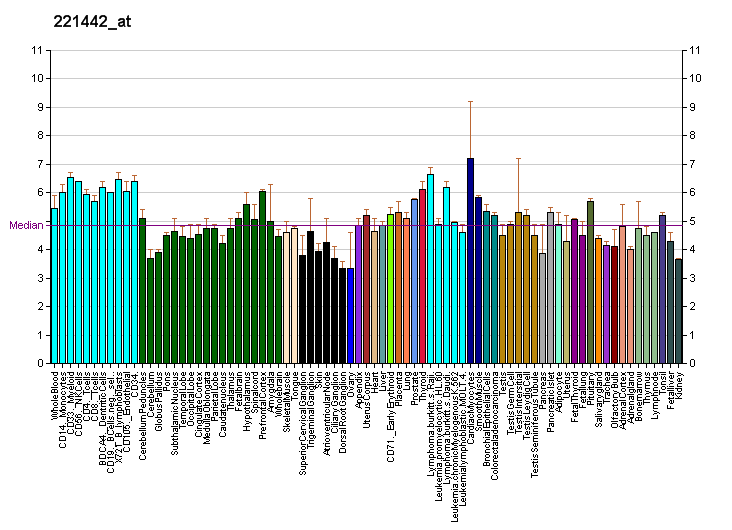
RNA expression pattern
Bgee	Human / Mouse (ortholog); Top expressed in: deltoid muscle; hypothalamus; prefrontal cortex; sensory organ; mucosa of nose; superior frontal gyrus; olfactory zone of nasal mucosa; dorsolateral prefrontal cortex; wall of uterus; endometrium / Top expressed in: embryo; gastrula; lumbar subsegment of spinal cord; meninges; arcuate nucleus; skin of abdomen; nucleus of stria terminalis; region of wall of ventricular system of neuraxis; ventricular system; choroid plexus; More reference expression data
BioGPS	More reference expression data
Gene ontology
Molecular function	G protein-coupled receptor activity; signal transducer activity; peptide hormone binding; melanocyte-stimulating hormone receptor activity; protein binding; melanocortin receptor activity; neuropeptide binding
Cellular component	integral component of membrane; membrane; plasma membrane; integral component of plasma membrane; intracellular anatomical structure
Biological process	homoiothermy; rhythmic process; adenylate cyclase-modulating G protein-coupled receptor signaling pathway; G protein-coupled receptor signaling pathway, coupled to cyclic nucleotide second messenger; regulation of feeding behavior; circadian regulation of gene expression; regulation of heart rate; regulation of blood pressure; phospholipase C-activating G protein-coupled receptor signaling pathway; sodium ion homeostasis; signal transduction; locomotor rhythm; G protein-coupled receptor signaling pathway; adenylate cyclase-activating G protein-coupled receptor signaling pathway
Sources:Amigo / QuickGO
Orthologs
Databases	NCBI: entry; OMA: entry
Species	Human	Mouse
Entrez	4159	17201
Ensembl	ENSG00000124089	ENSMUSG00000038537
UniProt	P41968	P33033
RefSeq (mRNA)	NM_019888	NM_008561
RefSeq (protein)	NP_063941	NP_032587
Location (UCSC)	Chr 20: 56.25 – 56.25 Mb	Chr 2: 172.09 – 172.09 Mb
PubMed search
- Wikidata
View/Edit Human	View/Edit Mouse

Melanocortin 3 receptor (MC_{3}R) is a protein that in humans is encoded by the MC3R gene.

== Function ==
This gene encodes MC_{3}R, a G-protein coupled receptor (GPCR) for melanocyte-stimulating hormone (MSH) and adrenocorticotropic hormone (ACTH) that is expressed in the brain.

Early research suggests that humans who carry loss-of-function mutations in MC3R may have a somewhat later onset of puberty (roughly 5 months later for heterozygous girls). This along with evidence from animal models has led some researchers to propose that MC3R may have a role in regulating the timing of sexual maturity.

== Research ==
Studies performed by the Eunice Kennedy Shriver National Institute of Child Health and Human Development (NICHD), found that two specific polymorphisms in the MC3R gene may be associated with pediatric obesity and greater body mass because of greater energy intake. Children who were homozygous for C17A + G241A consumed approximately 38% more than those who did not contain aforementioned polymorphisms. The study concluded that these genetic variants did not affect energy expenditure.

== Ligands ==
- Ac-Val-Gln-(pI)DPhe-DTic-NH2, first MC_{3} selective agonist, 100x selectivity over MC_{4}.
- Ac-Val-Gln-DBip-DTic-NH2, 140x selectivity over MC_{4}.
- Pyrrolidine bis-cyclic guanidines, non-peptide small molecule MC_{3} agonists, good selectivity over MC_{4} but not over MC_{1} or MC_{5}.
- SHU-9119, mixed MC_{3}/MC_{4} antagonist.

== Evolution ==
=== Paralogue ===
- MC5R
- MC4R
- MC1R
- MC2R
- LPAR1
- S1PR2
- GPR12
- S1PR1
- GPR6
- LPAR2
- S1PR3
- GPR3
- GPR119
- CNR1
- LPAR3
- S1PR5
- S1PR4
- CNR2

== See also ==
- Melanocortin receptor
