= LPAR3 =

Protein-coding gene in humans

Identifiers
- Aliases: LPAR3, EDG7, Edg-7, GPCR, HOFNH30, LP-A3, LPA3, RP4-678I3, lysophosphatidic acid receptor 3
- External IDs: OMIM: 605106; MGI: 1929469; GeneCards: LPAR3

Gene location (Human)
Chr.	Chromosome 1 (human)
Band	1p22.3	Start	84,811,602 bp
Band	1p22.3	End	84,893,206 bp

Gene location (Mouse)
Chr.	Chromosome 3 (mouse)
Band	3 H2|3 71.03 cM	Start	145,926,718 bp
Band	3 H2|3 71.03 cM	End	145,991,941 bp
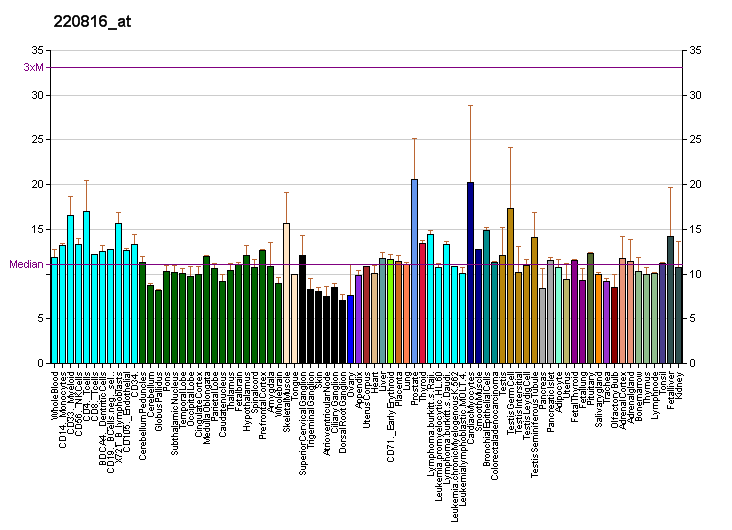
RNA expression pattern
Bgee	Human / Mouse (ortholog); Top expressed in: bronchial epithelial cell; right uterine tube; mucosa of paranasal sinus; spinal ganglia; olfactory zone of nasal mucosa; trigeminal ganglion; atrium; right auricle of heart; myocardium; cardiac muscle tissue of right atrium / Top expressed in: lumbar spinal ganglion; endocardial cushion; right kidney; membranous bone; Dermatocranium; maxilla; mandible; vestibular membrane of cochlear duct; atrioventricular junction; atrioventricular valve; More reference expression data
BioGPS	More reference expression data
Gene ontology
Molecular function	G protein-coupled receptor activity; signal transducer activity; lysophosphatidic acid receptor activity; G-protein alpha-subunit binding; phospholipid binding; lipid binding
Cellular component	integral component of membrane; membrane; integral component of plasma membrane; axon; plasma membrane
Biological process	chemical synaptic transmission; positive regulation of cytosolic calcium ion concentration involved in phospholipase C-activating G protein-coupled signaling pathway; positive regulation of cytosolic calcium ion concentration; G protein-coupled receptor signaling pathway, coupled to cyclic nucleotide second messenger; bleb assembly; positive regulation of collateral sprouting; signal transduction; positive regulation of MAPK cascade; positive regulation of calcium ion transport; G protein-coupled receptor signaling pathway
Sources:Amigo / QuickGO
Orthologs
Databases	NCBI: entry; OMA: entry
Species	Human	Mouse
Entrez	23566	65086
Ensembl	ENSG00000171517	ENSMUSG00000036832
UniProt	Q9UBY5	Q9EQ31
RefSeq (mRNA)	NM_012152	NM_022983
RefSeq (protein)	NP_036284	NP_075359
Location (UCSC)	Chr 1: 84.81 – 84.89 Mb	Chr 3: 145.93 – 145.99 Mb
PubMed search
- Wikidata
View/Edit Human	View/Edit Mouse

Lysophosphatidic acid receptor 3 also known as LPA_{3} is a protein in humans that is encoded by the LPAR3 gene. LPA_{3} is a G protein-coupled receptor that binds the lipid signaling molecule lysophosphatidic acid (LPA).

== Function ==
This gene encodes a member of the G protein-coupled receptor family, as well as the EDG family of proteins. This protein functions as a cellular receptor for lysophosphatidic acid and mediates lysophosphatidic acid-evoked calcium mobilization. This receptor couples predominantly to G(q/11) alpha proteins.

== Evolution ==
=== Paralogues ===
- LPAR1
- LPAR2
- S1PR1
- S1PR3
- S1PR4
- S1PR2
- S1PR5
- CNR1
- GPR3
- MC5R
- GPR6
- GPR12
- MC4R
- CNR2
- MC3R
- MC1R
- MC2R
- GPR119

== See also ==
- Lysophospholipid receptor
