= S1PR3 =

Protein and coding gene in humans

Identifiers
- Aliases: S1PR3, EDG-3, EDG3, LPB3, S1P3, sphingosine-1-phosphate receptor 3
- External IDs: OMIM: 601965; MGI: 1339365; GeneCards: S1PR3

Gene location (Human)
Chr.	Chromosome 9 (human)
Band	9q22.1	Start	88,990,863 bp
Band	9q22.1	End	89,005,155 bp

Gene location (Mouse)
Chr.	Chromosome 13 (mouse)
Band	13|13 A5	Start	51,562,675 bp
Band	13|13 A5	End	51,576,833 bp
RNA expression pattern
Bgee	Human / Mouse (ortholog); Top expressed in: myocardium of left ventricle; decidua; cardiac muscle tissue of right atrium; ventricular zone; right ventricle; right coronary artery; left coronary artery; tail of epididymis; Descending thoracic aorta; superficial temporal artery / Top expressed in: internal carotid artery; molar; left lung lobe; external carotid artery; dermis; epithelium of lens; fossa; body of femur; lumbar spinal ganglion; abdominal wall; More reference expression data
BioGPS	n/a
Gene ontology
Molecular function	signal transducer activity; lipid binding; integrin binding; sphingosine-1-phosphate receptor activity; G protein-coupled receptor activity; protein binding
Cellular component	integral component of membrane; integral component of plasma membrane; membrane; plasma membrane
Biological process	Notch signaling pathway; signal transduction; anatomical structure morphogenesis; positive regulation of cytosolic calcium ion concentration; G protein-coupled receptor signaling pathway; adenylate cyclase-inhibiting G protein-coupled receptor signaling pathway; negative regulation of establishment of endothelial barrier; positive regulation of cell population proliferation; sphingosine-1-phosphate receptor signaling pathway; regulation of interleukin-1 beta production; cytokine production; inflammatory response
Sources:Amigo / QuickGO
Orthologs
Databases	NCBI: entry; OMA: entry
Species	Human	Mouse
Entrez	1903	13610
Ensembl	ENSG00000213694	ENSMUSG00000067586
UniProt	Q99500	Q9Z0U9
RefSeq (mRNA)	NM_005226	NM_010101
RefSeq (protein)	NP_005217	NP_034231
Location (UCSC)	Chr 9: 88.99 – 89.01 Mb	Chr 13: 51.56 – 51.58 Mb
PubMed search
- Wikidata
View/Edit Human	View/Edit Mouse

Sphingosine-1-phosphate receptor 3 also known as S1PR3 is a human gene which encodes a G protein-coupled receptor which binds the lipid signaling molecule sphingosine 1-phosphate (S1P). Hence this receptor is also known as S1P_{3}.

== Function ==
This gene encodes a member of the EDG family of receptors, which are G protein-coupled receptors. This protein has been identified as a functional receptor for sphingosine 1-phosphate and likely contributes to the regulation of angiogenesis and vascular endothelial cell function.

== Evolution ==
=== Paralogues to S1PR3 Gene ===
- S1PR1
- S1PR5
- S1PR2
- S1PR4
- LPAR1
- LPAR3
- LPAR2
- CNR1
- MC5R
- GPR6
- GPR12
- MC4R
- CNR2
- GPR3
- MC3R
- MC2R
- GPR119
- MC1R

== See also ==
- Lysophospholipid receptor
