= Melanocortin 1 receptor =

Protein controlling mammalian coloration

MC1R

Identifiers
- Aliases: MC1R, CMM5, MSH-R, SHEP2, Melanocortin 1 receptor
- External IDs: OMIM: 155555; MGI: 99456; GeneCards: MC1R

Gene location (Human)
Chr.	Chromosome 16 (human)
Band	16q24.3	Start	89,912,119 bp
Band	16q24.3	End	89,920,973 bp

Gene location (Mouse)
Chr.	Chromosome 8 (mouse)
Band	8 E1|8 72.1 cM	Start	124,133,846 bp
Band	8 E1|8 72.1 cM	End	124,137,483 bp
RNA expression pattern
Bgee	Human / Mouse (ortholog); Top expressed in: granulocyte; right uterine tube; left testis; right hemisphere of cerebellum; anterior pituitary; right testis; gastric mucosa; left lobe of thyroid gland; right lobe of thyroid gland; left ovary / Top expressed in: hair follicle; Ileal epithelium; iris; embryo; neural layer of retina; epithelium of lens; skin of abdomen; yolk sac; cornea; More reference expression data
BioGPS	n/a
Gene ontology
Molecular function	G protein-coupled peptide receptor activity; G protein-coupled receptor activity; signal transducer activity; melanocyte-stimulating hormone receptor activity; protein binding; melanocortin receptor activity; ubiquitin protein ligase binding
Cellular component	integral component of membrane; membrane; plasma membrane; integral component of plasma membrane; intracellular anatomical structure
Biological process	G protein-coupled receptor signaling pathway, coupled to cyclic nucleotide second messenger; multicellular organism development; UV protection; negative regulation of tumor necrosis factor production; UV-damage excision repair; signal transduction; positive regulation of protein kinase A signaling; intracellular signal transduction; pigmentation; positive regulation of transcription by RNA polymerase II; positive regulation of protein kinase B signaling; positive regulation of protein kinase C signaling; G protein-coupled receptor signaling pathway; adenylate cyclase-activating G protein-coupled receptor signaling pathway; sensory perception of pain; melanin biosynthetic process
Sources:Amigo / QuickGO
Orthologs
Databases	NCBI: entry; OMA: entry
Species	Human	Mouse
Entrez	4157	17199
Ensembl	ENSG00000258839	ENSMUSG00000074037
UniProt	Q01726	Q01727
RefSeq (mRNA)	NM_002386	NM_008559
RefSeq (protein)	NP_002377	NP_032585
Location (UCSC)	Chr 16: 89.91 – 89.92 Mb	Chr 8: 124.13 – 124.14 Mb
PubMed search
- Wikidata
View/Edit Human	View/Edit Mouse

The melanocortin 1 receptor (MC1R), also known as melanocyte-stimulating hormone receptor (MSHR), melanin-activating peptide receptor, or melanotropin receptor, is a G protein–coupled receptor that binds to a class of pituitary peptide hormones known as the melanocortins, which include adrenocorticotropic hormone (ACTH) and the different forms of melanocyte-stimulating hormone (MSH). It is coupled to G_{αs} and upregulates levels of cAMP by activating adenylyl cyclase in cells expressing this receptor. It is normally expressed in skin and melanocytes, and to a lesser degree in periaqueductal gray matter, astrocytes and leukocytes. In skin cancer, MC1R is highly expressed in melanomas but not carcinomas.

MC1R is one of the key proteins involved in regulating mammalian skin color and hair color. It is located on the plasma membrane of specialized cells known as melanocytes, which produce the pigment melanin through the process of melanogenesis. It controls the type of melanin being produced, and its activation causes the melanocyte to switch from generating the yellow-red phaeomelanin by default to the brown-black eumelanin in replacement.

In humans, a number of loss-of-function mutations of MC1R have been described, with redheads often having multiple individual loss-of-function mutations, but as of 2001, activating mutations that increase eumelanin synthesis have not been described.

MC1R has also been reported to be involved in cancer (independent of skin coloration), developmental processes, and susceptibility to infections and pain.

== Functions ==
=== Coloration in mammals ===
The MC1R protein lies within the cell membrane, and is signalled by melanocyte-stimulating hormone (MSH) released by the pituitary gland. When activated by one of the variants of MSH, typically α-MSH, MC1R initiates a complex signaling cascade that leads to the production of eumelanin. In contrast, the receptor can also be antagonized by agouti signalling peptide (ASIP), which reverts the cell back to producing the yellow or red phaeomelanin.

The yellow and black agouti banding pattern observed on most mammalian hair is caused by the pulsative nature of ASIP signalling through MC1R. Exceptions include particoloured bay horses, which have reddish bodies, and black legs, mane, and tail, where ASIP signaling is limited to regions instead of pulsating. Human hair, which is neither banded nor particoloured, is thought to be regulated by α-MSH signaling through MC1R exclusively.

The prevalence of red hair in humans varies considerably worldwide. In the United States, about 25% of the human population carries the mutated melanocortin 1 receptor that causes red hair. With one in four people as carriers, the chance of two people having a child with red hair is about 2% (one in 64). People with freckles and no red hair have an 85% chance of carrying the MC1R gene that is connected to red hair. People with no freckles and no red hair have an 18% chance of carrying the MC1R gene linked to red hair. Eight genes have been identified in humans that control whether the MC1R gene is turned on and the person has red hair.

=== Coloration in birds ===
MC1R is responsible for melanic polymorphisms in at least three unrelated species: the bananaquit, the snow goose, and the arctic skua.

=== Pain in mammals ===
In mutant yellow-orange mice and human redheads, both with nonfunctional MC1R, both genotypes display reduced sensitivity to noxious stimuli and increased analgesic responsiveness to morphine-metabolite analgesics. These observations suggest a role for mammalian MC1R outside the pigment cell, though the exact mechanism through which the protein can modulate pain sensation is not known.

In a certain genetic background in mice it has been reported that animals lacking MC1R had increased tolerance to capsaicin acting through the TRPV1 receptor and decreased response to chemically induced inflammatory pain.

Humans with MC1R mutations have been reported to need approximately 20% more inhalational anaesthetic than controls. Lidocaine was reported to be much less effective in reducing pain in another study of humans with MC1R mutations

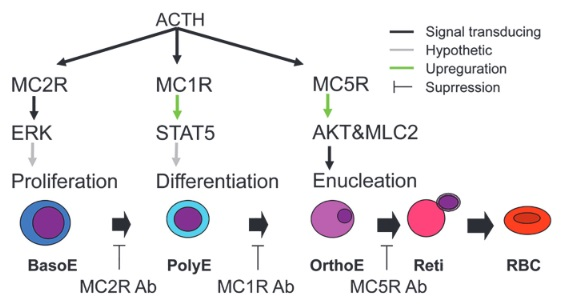
Model of melanocortin receptors and erythropoiesis

=== Some roles in development ===
Since G protein–coupled receptors are known to activate Signal transduction in cells, it should not be surprising to find MC1R involved in development. As one example at the cellular level, preventing signalling by MC1R stopped erythropoiesis from proceeding from the polychromatic cell stage (poly-E in the figure) to the orthochromatic cell stage (ortho-E in the diagram). The same report showed that neutralizing antibodies to MC1R prevented phosphorylation of STAT5 by erythropoietin, and that MC2R and MC5R were also involved, as shown in their model.

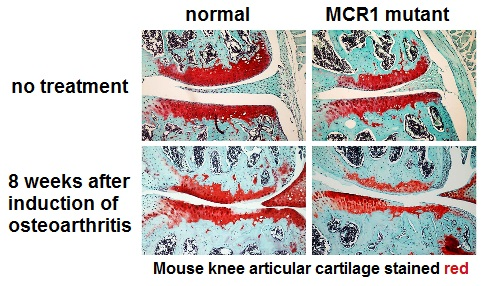
MC1R deficiency and osteoarthritis

One example at the tissue level showed the involvement of MC1R in the normal and pathological development of articular cartilage in the mouse knee. In this study the authors compared normal mice with mice completely lacking MC1R. Even without experimental induction of osteoarthritis, mice without MC1R had less articular cartilage (as shown by the red staining in the image). After experimental induction of osteoarthritis, the defect caused by MC1R was more pronounced.

=== MC1R and infection/inflammation ===
The involvement of MC1R in a rat model of Candida albicans vaginitis was investigated. These authors suggest that MC1R is important in anti-fungal and anti-inflammatory processes, in part because siRNA knockdown of MC1R almost completely prevented the responses.

Nosocomial infections are of variable importance. One of the most important is complicated sepsis, which was defined as sepsis with organ dysfunction. One variant of MC1R (MC1RR163Q, rs885479) was reported to be associated with lowered risk of developing complicated sepsis during hospitalization after trauma. Thus, if the association is confirmed, MC1R targeting may become a therapeutic option to prevent severe sepsis.

=== Role in cancer independent of skin color ===
MC1R signalling stimulates antioxidant and DNA repair pathways, as reviewed. There are single nucleotide polymorphisms in MC1R that are associated with predisposition to nonmelanoma skin cancer. It has been reported that variants of MC1R, even in heterozygotes and independent of their effects on pigmentation, are risk factors for basal cell carcinoma and squamous cell carcinoma. A review has discussed the role of some MC1R variants in melanoma and basal and squamous cell carcinomas independent of pigment production.

=== Role in kidney pathology ===
Membranous glomerulonephritis is a serious human disease that can be treated with ACTH, which is a known agonist of MC1R. In a rat model of nephritis it was found that treatment with a different agonist of MC1R improved aspects of kidney morphology and reduced proteinuria, which may help explain the benefit of ACTH in humans.

=== In other organisms ===
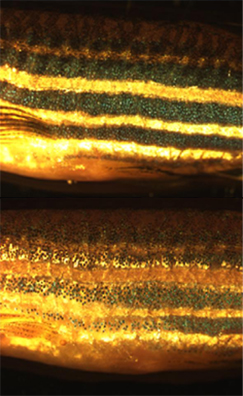
Zebrafish MC1R mediates the response of fish chromatophores on exposure to dark (top), in comparison to light (bottom), environments.

MC1R has a slightly different function in cold-blooded animals such as fish, amphibians, and reptiles. Here, α-MSH activation of MC1R results in the dispersion of eumelanin-filled melanosomes throughout the interior of pigment cells (called melanophores). This gives the skin of the animal a darker hue and often occurs in response to changes in mood or environment. Such a physiological color change implicates MC1R as a key mediator of adaptive cryptic coloration. The role of ASIP's binding to MC1R in regulating this adaptation is unclear; however, in teleost fish at least, functional antagonism is provided by melanin-concentrating hormone. This signals through its receptor to aggregate the melanosomes toward a small area in the centre of the melanophore, resulting in the animal's having a lighter overall appearance. Cephalopods generate a similar, albeit more dramatic, pigmentary effect using muscles to rapidly stretch and relax their pigmented chromatophores. MC1R does not appear to play a role in the rapid and spectacular colour changes observed in these invertebrates.

== Ligands ==
=== Agonists ===
- α-MSH - nonselective peptide full agonist
- β-MSH - nonselective peptide full agonist
- γ-MSH - nonselective peptide full agonist
- ACTH - nonselective peptide full agonist
- Afamelanotide - nonselective peptide full agonist
- BMS-470,539 - selective small-molecule full agonist
- Bremelanotide - nonselective peptide full agonist
- Melanotan II - nonselective peptide full agonist
- Modimelanotide - nonselective peptide full agonist
- Setmelanotide - nonselective peptide full agonist

=== Antagonists ===
- Agouti signalling peptide - nonselective peptide antagonist

== Pigmentation genetics ==
MC1R gene expression is regulated by the microphthalmia-associated transcription factor (MITF). Mutations of the MC1R gene either can create a receptor that constantly signals, even when not stimulated, or can lower the receptor's activity. Alleles for constitutively active MC1R are inherited dominantly and result in a black coat colour, whereas alleles for dysfunctional MC1R are recessive and result in a light coat colour. Variants of MC1R associated with black, red/yellow, and white/cream coat colors in numerous animal species have been reported, including:

- Laboratory mice
- Dogs
- Big cats
- Horses
- Cattle
- Chickens
- Bananaquit
- Gyrfalcon
- Kermode bears
- Rock pocket mice
- Domestic rabbits
- Antarctic fur seals
- Mammoth

A study on unrelated British and Irish individuals demonstrated that over 80% of people with red hair and/or fair skin that tan poorly have a dysfunctional variant of the MC1R gene. This is compared to less than 20% in people with brown or black hair, and less than 4% in people showing a good tanning response.

Asp294His (rs1805009) is a single nucleotide polymorphism (SNP) in the MC1R gene and it is associated with red hair and light skin type. Other SNPs in the gene, Arg151Cys and Arg160Trp, are also associated with red hair.

The Out-of-Africa model proposes that modern humans originated in Africa and migrated north to populate Europe and Asia. These migrants most likely had a functional MC1R variant and, accordingly, dark hair and skin as displayed by indigenous Africans today. As humans migrated north, the absence of high levels of solar radiation in northern Europe and Asia relaxed the selective pressure on active MC1R, allowing the gene to mutate into dysfunctional variants without reproductive penalty, then propagate by genetic drift. Studies show the MC1R Arg163Gln allele has a high frequency in East Asia and may be part of the evolution of light skin in East Asian populations. No evidence is known for positive selection of MC1R alleles in Europe and there is no evidence of an association between the emergence of dysfunctional variants of MC1R and the evolution of light skin in European populations. The lightening of skin color in Europeans and East Asians is an example of convergent evolution.

== Evolution ==
=== Paralogues ===
- MC4R
- MC3R
- MC5R
- MC2R
- GPR6
- GPR12
- S1PR2
- GPR3
- S1PR1
- LPAR1
- CNR1
- LPAR2
- GPR119
- S1PR3
- S1PR5
- LPAR3
- CNR2
- S1PR4

== See also ==
- Chromatophore
- Melanocyte
- SLC24A5
- Melanin
- Pigment
- Human skin color
- Freckles
- Melanotropin receptor
