= ACTH receptor =

Mammalian protein found in humans

MC2R

Identifiers
- Aliases: MC2R, ACTHR, melanocortin 2 receptor
- External IDs: OMIM: 607397; MGI: 96928; GeneCards: MC2R

Gene location (Human)
Chr.	Chromosome 18 (human)
Band	18p11.21	Start	13,882,044 bp
Band	18p11.21	End	13,915,707 bp

Gene location (Mouse)
Chr.	Chromosome 18 (mouse)
Band	18 E2|18 41.89 cM	Start	68,539,978 bp
Band	18 E2|18 41.89 cM	End	68,562,391 bp
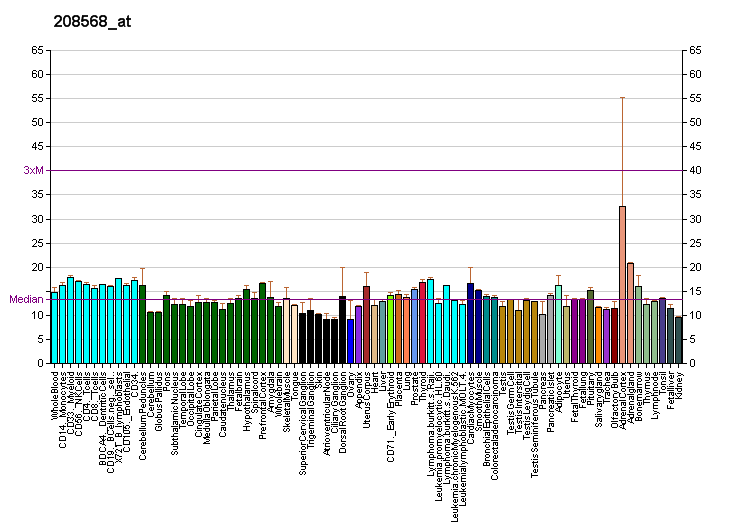

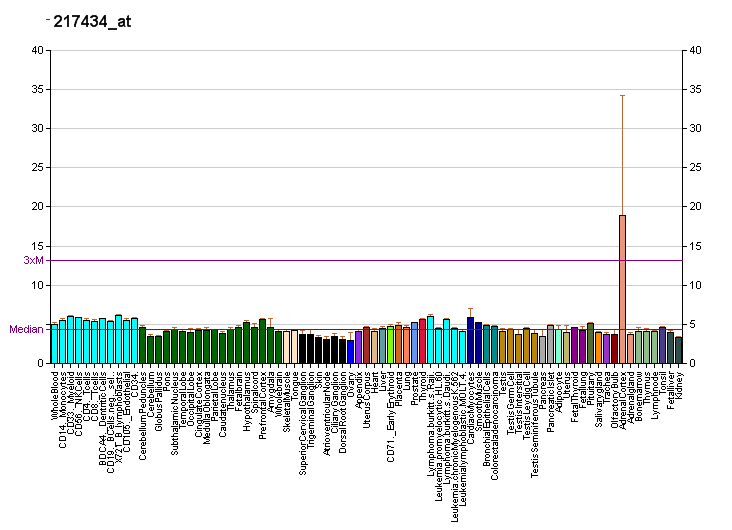
RNA expression pattern
Bgee	Human / Mouse (ortholog); Top expressed in: right adrenal gland; left adrenal gland; right adrenal cortex; left adrenal cortex; metanephros; pituitary gland; anterior pituitary; appendix; testicle; right testis / Top expressed in: adrenal gland; white adipose tissue; lactiferous gland; adrenal cortex; brown adipose tissue; subcutaneous adipose tissue; muscle of thigh; ankle; striated muscle tissue; tibiofemoral joint; More reference expression data
BioGPS	More reference expression data
Gene ontology
Molecular function	melanocortin receptor activity; protein binding; G protein-coupled receptor activity; corticotropin receptor activity; signal transducer activity
Cellular component	cytoplasm; integral component of membrane; plasma membrane; integral component of plasma membrane; membrane
Biological process	G protein-coupled receptor signaling pathway; G protein-coupled receptor signaling pathway, coupled to cyclic nucleotide second messenger; signal transduction; placenta development; neuropeptide signaling pathway; adenylate cyclase-activating G protein-coupled receptor signaling pathway
Sources:Amigo / QuickGO
Orthologs
Databases	NCBI: entry; OMA: entry
Species	Human	Mouse
Entrez	4158	17200
Ensembl	ENSG00000185231	ENSMUSG00000045569
UniProt	Q01718	Q64326
RefSeq (mRNA)	NM_001291911; NM_000529	NM_001271716; NM_001271717; NM_008560; NM_001301372
RefSeq (protein)	NP_000520; NP_001278840	NP_001258645; NP_001258646; NP_001288301; NP_032586
Location (UCSC)	Chr 18: 13.88 – 13.92 Mb	Chr 18: 68.54 – 68.56 Mb
PubMed search
- Wikidata
View/Edit Human	View/Edit Mouse

The adrenocorticotropic hormone receptor or ACTH receptor also known as the melanocortin receptor 2 or MC_{2} receptor is a type of melanocortin receptor (type 2) which is specific for ACTH. A G protein–coupled receptor located on the external cell plasma membrane, it is coupled to G_{αs} and upregulates levels of cAMP by activating adenylyl cyclase. The ACTH receptor plays a role in immune function and glucose metabolism.

== Structure ==
ACTH receptors are the shortest of the melanocortin receptor family and are the smallest known G-coupled receptors. Both human and bovine ACTH receptors are synthesized as 297 residue long proteins with 81% sequence homology. There are currently no available protein X-ray crystallography structures for the ACTH receptor available in the Protein Data Bank; while the ACTH receptor and the β_{2} adrenergic receptor are relatively distantly-related with a sequence identity of approximately 26%, MC2R investigators such as David Fridmanis have assumed that the folded surfaces of both receptors that are responsible for binding G_{αs} should be very similar and use conserved motifs.

The full length sequence of MC2R includes seven hydrophobic domains that are predicted as transmembrane segments. In the third intracellular loop of the receptor a protein kinase A and protein kinase c phosphorylation motifs have been detected. ACTH receptors also require the binding of melanocortin-2 receptor accessory protein-1 (MRAP1) without which ACTH receptors cannot bind ACTH. Without MRAP, the receptor is degraded in the endoplasmic reticulum, but with MRAP, the receptor is glycosylated and expressed on the cell plasma membrane.

== Ligands ==
MCR's have both endogenous agonists and antagonists.

=== Agonists ===
α-MSH and ACTH are both peptides derived from processed POMC, and both activate the other MCR's, but ACTH is the only agonist ligand for MC2R (ACTH receptor). This suggests that there is more protein-related specificity for binding MC2R.

=== Antagonists ===
Agouti-related protein and Agouti-signaling protein are antagonist peptides to MC2R.

== Tissue and subcellular localization ==
ACTH receptor is primarily found in the zona fasciculata of the human adrenal cortex. Binding of the receptor by ACTH stimulates the production of glucocorticoids (GCs)—by contrast, aldosterone production from the zona glomerulosa is stimulated primarily by angiotensin II. ACTH receptors are also expressed in the skin, and in both white and brown adipocytes, and is expressed in greater concentrations when adipose cells differentiate.

It is well known that levels of corticosterone (CORT, cortisol in humans) secretion demonstrate a circadian rhythm, highly regulated by effects of the suprachiasmatic nucleus, with higher levels in the early evening and lower levels in the morning. ACTH levels, ACTH receptor expression, and MRAP1 expression also demonstrate circadian rhythm, with ACTH secretion and MRAP expression highest in the evening, suggesting that MRAP expression is responsible for CORT secretory regulation. However, with exposure to constant light, the rhythmic expression of the ACTH receptor and MRAP genes reversed, suggesting ACTH-independent signalling pathways for MRAP and ACTH receptor transcription and expression.

== Clinical significance ==
The ACTH receptor plays a role in glucose metabolism when expressed in white adipose cells. When bound to ACTH, a short-term insulin-resistance occurs, and it stimulates lipolysis via hormone sensitive lipase. Demonstrated in mice, ACTH promotes lipolysis in response to increased energy demand, notably in times of stress. Lipolytic activity due to melanocortin receptors has been demonstrated in several types of test animals: rats and hamsters primarily respond to ACTH, rabbits respond to alpha and beta MSH's (therefore not using the ACTH receptor), and guinea pigs responding to both ACTH and other MSH's. In humans, ACTH has little lipolytic effect on adipose tissue.

ACTH receptor activation also influences immune function. Melanocortins, including ACTH, have anti-inflammatory effects which can be exerted via GC-dependent and -independent pathways. The GC-dependent pathway activates ACTH receptors to increase levels of cortisol which bind GC receptors. Via genomic and faster non-genomic pathways, this causes, among other immune responses, a reduction in leukocyte and neutrophil infiltration, cytokine production, especially of cytokine CXCL-1, and increased phagocytosis of apoptotic neutrophils. These profound anti-inflammatory effects and the ability to increase GC's are why ACTH therapy is still used today. It is often used as treatment for infantile spasms, multiple sclerosis, nephrotic syndrome, gout, ulcerative colitis, Crohn's disease, rheumatoid arthritis, and systemic lupus erythematosus. This is problematic long-term and can lead to ACTH-receptor pathway-related side effects including: Cushing's syndrome, fluid retention, glaucoma, and cardiovascular disorders.

Mutations in this receptor cause familial glucocorticoid deficiency (FGD) type 1, in which patients have high levels of serum ACTH and low levels of cortisol. Mutation of the receptor gene causes 25% of FGD, and mutation on the MRAP gene causes 20% of FGD. Mutations of ACTH can also contribute to this pathology: mutation of the "message sequence" inhibits cAMP production when bound to the ACTH receptor, and mutation of the "address sequence" inhibits binding to the receptor altogether.

== Evolution ==
=== Paralogue ===
- MC4R
- MC3R
- MC5R
- MC1R
- GPR12
- S1PR1
- S1PR2
- LPAR1
- CNR1
- S1PR3
- GPR6
- GPR3
- S1PR5
- LPAR3
- S1PR4
- CNR2
- GPR119
- LPAR2

== See also ==
- melanocortin
