= S1PR5 =

Protein-coding gene in the species Homo sapiens

Identifiers
- Aliases: S1PR5, EDG8, Edg-8, S1P5, SPPR-1, SPPR-2, sphingosine-1-phosphate receptor 5
- External IDs: OMIM: 605146; MGI: 2150641; GeneCards: S1PR5

Gene location (Human)
Chr.	Chromosome 19 (human)
Band	19p13.2	Start	10,512,742 bp
Band	19p13.2	End	10,517,931 bp

Gene location (Mouse)
Chr.	Chromosome 9 (mouse)
Band	9|9 A3	Start	21,154,208 bp
Band	9|9 A3	End	21,159,739 bp
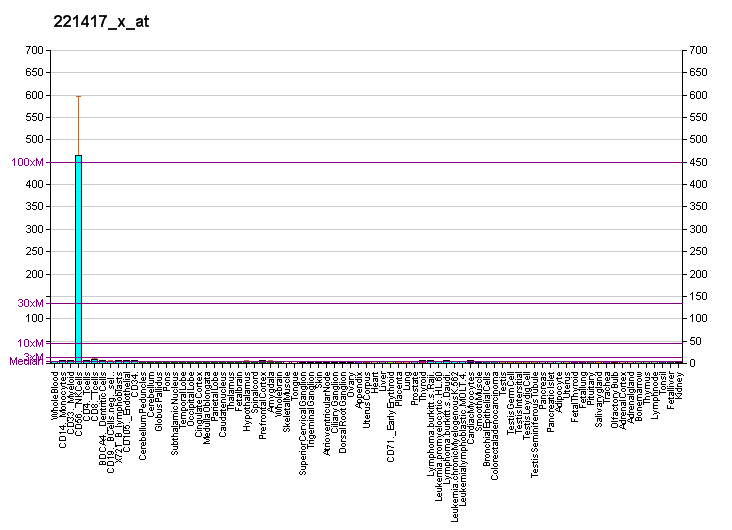
RNA expression pattern
Bgee	Human / Mouse (ortholog); Top expressed in: granulocyte; C1 segment; internal globus pallidus; inferior ganglion of vagus nerve; corpus callosum; substantia nigra; skin of arm; subthalamic nucleus; blood; putamen / Top expressed in: lumbar subsegment of spinal cord; substantia nigra; motor neuron; deep cerebellar nuclei; conjunctival fornix; lateral geniculate nucleus; anterior horn of spinal cord; cornea; pontine nuclei; globus pallidus; More reference expression data
BioGPS	More reference expression data
Gene ontology
Molecular function	sphingosine-1-phosphate receptor activity; G protein-coupled receptor activity; signal transducer activity
Cellular component	integral component of membrane; plasma membrane; membrane
Biological process	regulation of neuron differentiation; sphingosine-1-phosphate receptor signaling pathway; signal transduction; G protein-coupled receptor signaling pathway
Sources:Amigo / QuickGO
Orthologs
Databases	NCBI: entry; OMA: entry
Species	Human	Mouse
Entrez	53637	94226
Ensembl	ENSG00000180739	ENSMUSG00000045087
UniProt	Q9H228	Q91X56
RefSeq (mRNA)	NM_030760; NM_001166215	NM_053190
RefSeq (protein)	NP_001159687; NP_110387	NP_444420
Location (UCSC)	Chr 19: 10.51 – 10.52 Mb	Chr 9: 21.15 – 21.16 Mb
PubMed search
- Wikidata
View/Edit Human	View/Edit Mouse

Sphingosine-1-phosphate receptor 5 also known as S1PR5 is a human gene which encodes a G protein-coupled receptor which binds the lipid signaling molecule sphingosine 1-phosphate (S1P). Hence this receptor is also known as S1P_{5}.

== Agonists ==
- A-971432
- Sphingosine 1-phosphate receptor agonists: a patent review (2010-2012)

== Evolution ==
=== Paralogues for S1PR5 Gene ===
- S1PR1
- S1PR3
- S1PR2
- S1PR4
- LPAR1
- LPAR2
- GPR3
- LPAR3
- GPR12
- CNR1
- GPR6
- CNR2
- MC4R
- MC3R
- MC5R
- GPR119
- MC1R
- MC2R

== See also ==
- Lysophospholipid receptor
