= LPAR2 =

Protein-coding gene in the species Homo sapiens

Identifiers
- Aliases: LPAR2, EDG-4, EDG4, LPA-2, LPA2, lysophosphatidic acid receptor 2
- External IDs: OMIM: 605110; MGI: 1858422; GeneCards: LPAR2
Available structures
PDB	Ortholog search: PDBe RCSB
PDB	List of PDB id codes 4P0C

Gene location (Human)
Chr.	Chromosome 19 (human)
Band	19p13.11	Start	19,623,655 bp
Band	19p13.11	End	19,628,930 bp

Gene location (Mouse)
Chr.	Chromosome 8 (mouse)
Band	8 B3.3|8 33.91 cM	Start	70,275,079 bp
Band	8 B3.3|8 33.91 cM	End	70,283,752 bp
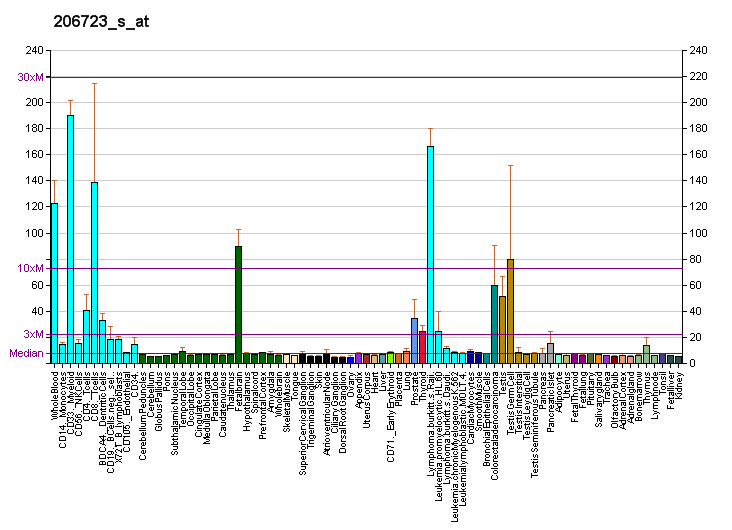

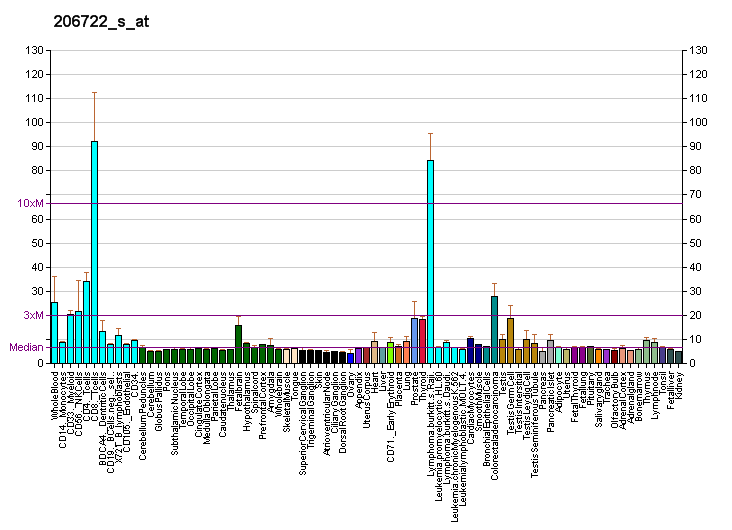
RNA expression pattern
Bgee	Human / Mouse (ortholog); Top expressed in: ganglionic eminence; ventricular zone; granulocyte; blood; right testis; spleen; left testis; monocyte; mucosa of transverse colon; right lung / Top expressed in: granulocyte; yolk sac; epiblast; tail of embryo; otic vesicle; genital tubercle; ventricular zone; ganglion of vagus nerve; primitive streak; placenta; More reference expression data
BioGPS	More reference expression data
Gene ontology
Molecular function	lipid binding; protein binding; lysophosphatidic acid receptor activity; signal transducer activity; G protein-coupled receptor activity
Cellular component	integral component of plasma membrane; membrane; endocytic vesicle; integral component of membrane; plasma membrane; cell surface
Biological process	activation of phospholipase C activity; signal transduction; positive regulation of cytosolic calcium ion concentration; G protein-coupled receptor signaling pathway
Sources:Amigo / QuickGO
Orthologs
Databases	NCBI: entry; OMA: entry
Species	Human	Mouse
Entrez	9170	53978
Ensembl	ENSG00000064547	ENSMUSG00000031861
UniProt	Q9HBW0	Q9JL06; Q6P290
RefSeq (mRNA)	NM_004720; NM_001395660	NM_020028
RefSeq (protein)	NP_004711	NP_064412
Location (UCSC)	Chr 19: 19.62 – 19.63 Mb	Chr 8: 70.28 – 70.28 Mb
PubMed search
- Wikidata
View/Edit Human	View/Edit Mouse

Lysophosphatidic acid receptor 2 also known as LPA_{2} is a protein that in humans is encoded by the LPAR2 gene. LPA_{2} is a G protein-coupled receptor that binds the lipid signaling molecule lysophosphatidic acid (LPA).

== Function ==
This gene encodes a member of family I of the G protein-coupled receptors, as well as the EDG family of proteins. This protein functions as a lysophosphatidic acid (LPA) receptor and contributes to Ca^{2+} mobilization, a critical cellular response to LPA in cells, through association with Gi and Gq proteins.

== Interactions ==
LPAR2 has been shown to interact with TRIP6.

== Evolution ==
=== Paralogues ===
- LPAR1
- LPAR3
- S1PR1
- S1PR5
- S1PR4
- S1PR2
- S1PR3
- GPR6
- GPR3
- GPR12
- MC4R
- MC5R
- CNR1
- MC3R
- CNR2
- MC1R
- GPR119
- MC2R

== See also ==
- Lysophospholipid receptor
