= S1PR1 =

Protein and coding gene in humans

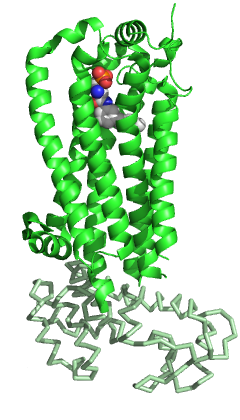

Identifiers
- Aliases: S1PR1, CD363, CHEDG1, D1S3362, ECGF1, EDG-1, EDG1, S1P1, sphingosine-1-phosphate receptor 1
- External IDs: OMIM: 601974; MGI: 1096355; GeneCards: S1PR1
Available structures
PDB	Ortholog search: PDBe RCSB
PDB	List of PDB id codes 3V2W, 3V2Y

Gene location (Human)
Chr.	Chromosome 1 (human)
Band	1p21.2	Start	101,236,865 bp
Band	1p21.2	End	101,243,713 bp

Gene location (Mouse)
Chr.	Chromosome 3 (mouse)
Band	3|3 G1	Start	115,504,082 bp
Band	3|3 G1	End	115,508,721 bp
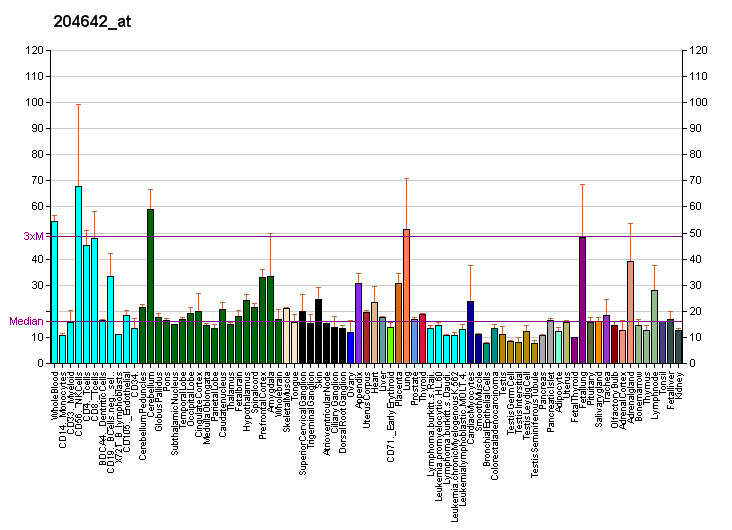
RNA expression pattern
Bgee	Human / Mouse (ortholog); Top expressed in: right lung; upper lobe of left lung; ventricular zone; granulocyte; subcutaneous adipose tissue; apex of heart; left ventricle; right auricle of heart; caudate nucleus; right lobe of thyroid gland / Top expressed in: right lung lobe; globus pallidus; dentate gyrus of hippocampal formation granule cell; atrium; left lung; superior frontal gyrus; inferior colliculi; mesenteric lymph nodes; cerebellar cortex; primary visual cortex; More reference expression data
BioGPS	More reference expression data
Gene ontology
Molecular function	sphingolipid binding; sphingosine-1-phosphate receptor activity; G protein-coupled receptor activity; signal transducer activity; G protein-coupled receptor binding; protein binding
Cellular component	integral component of membrane; endosome; membrane; intrinsic component of plasma membrane; plasma membrane; membrane raft; external side of plasma membrane; nucleoplasm; intracellular membrane-bounded organelle
Biological process	actin cytoskeleton reorganization; T cell migration; G protein-coupled receptor signaling pathway; heart trabecula morphogenesis; positive regulation of cytosolic calcium ion concentration involved in phospholipase C-activating G protein-coupled signaling pathway; adenylate cyclase-inhibiting G protein-coupled receptor signaling pathway; sphingosine-1-phosphate receptor signaling pathway; positive regulation of cell migration; regulation of bone mineralization; transmission of nerve impulse; chemotaxis; positive regulation of positive chemotaxis; positive regulation of GTPase activity; brain development; regulation of cell adhesion; cell adhesion; angiogenesis; neuron differentiation; positive regulation of cell population proliferation; endothelial cell differentiation; negative regulation of stress fiber assembly; regulation of bone resorption; cell migration; signal transduction; lamellipodium assembly; positive regulation of transcription by RNA polymerase II; cardiac muscle tissue growth involved in heart morphogenesis; positive regulation of smooth muscle cell proliferation; blood vessel maturation; leukocyte chemotaxis; cytokine-mediated signaling pathway
Sources:Amigo / QuickGO
Orthologs
Databases	NCBI: entry; OMA: entry
Species	Human	Mouse
Entrez	1901	13609
Ensembl	ENSG00000170989	ENSMUSG00000045092
UniProt	P21453	O08530
RefSeq (mRNA)	NM_001400; NM_001320730	NM_007901
RefSeq (protein)	NP_001307659; NP_001391	NP_031927
Location (UCSC)	Chr 1: 101.24 – 101.24 Mb	Chr 3: 115.5 – 115.51 Mb
PubMed search
- Wikidata
View/Edit Human	View/Edit Mouse

Sphingosine-1-phosphate receptor 1 (S1P receptor 1 or S1PR1), also known as endothelial differentiation gene 1 (EDG1) is a protein that in humans is encoded by the S1PR1 gene. S1PR1 is a G-protein-coupled receptor which binds the bioactive signaling molecule sphingosine 1-phosphate (S1P). S1PR1 belongs to a sphingosine-1-phosphate receptor subfamily comprising five members (S1PR1-5). S1PR1 was originally identified as an abundant transcript in endothelial cells and it has an important role in regulating endothelial cell cytoskeletal structure, migration, capillary-like network formation and vascular maturation. In addition, S1PR1 signaling is important in the regulation of lymphocyte maturation, migration and trafficking.

== Structure ==
S1PR1 like the other members of the GPCR family is composed of seven-transmembrane helices arranged in a structurally conserved bundle. Like other GPCRs, in the extracellular region S1PR1 is composed of three loops: ECL1 between helices II and III, ECL2 between helices IV and V and ECL3 between helices VI and VII. Compared to the other members of the family, S1PR1 has some specific features. The N terminus of the protein folds as a helical cap above the top of the receptor and therefore it limits the access of the ligands to the amphipathic binding pocket. This marked amphipathicity is indeed in agreement with the zwitterionic nature of S1P. In addition, helices ECL1 and ECL2 pack tightly against the N-terminal helix, further occluding the access of the ligand from the extracellular space. S1P or S1P analogs are likely to reach the binding pocket from within the cell membrane and not from the extracellular space, may be through an opening between helices I and VII. Compared to the other GPCRs, this region is more open due to a different positioning of helices I and II toward helix III. This occlusion of the ligand access space from the extracellular space could also explain the slow saturation of receptor binding in the presence of excess ligand.

== Function ==
Like the other members of the GPCR family, S1PR1 senses its ligand from outside the cell and activates intracellular signal pathways that at last lead to cellular responses. The signal is transduced through the association of the receptor with different G proteins, which recruits a series of systems for downstream amplification of the signal.

=== Immune system ===
==== Immune cell trafficking ====
S1P and its receptors play a key role in regulating immune cell trafficking by forming gradients that guide immune cells between tissues and vascular compartments. S1PR1 is pivotal in promoting T-cell egress from lymphoid organs, while changes in S1P levels can influence immune cell migration and positioning in lymphoid and non-lymphoid tissues during inflammation or immune surveillance.

S1PR1, primarily located on the cell membrane of most lymphocytes, binds to the abundant ligand S1P in the bloodstream to promote lymphocyte egress from lymphoid organs, allowing them to travel to affected tissues. S1PR1 is responsive to the S1P gradient between the lymphoid tissues (low S1P) and the lymph (high S1P), facilitating T cell movement through the endothelial barrier. However, upon T cell activation in lymphoid organs via cytokine and T-cell receptor signaling, the protein Cluster of Differentiation 69 (CD69) is expressed and forms a complex with S1PR1. This interaction, involving CD69 transmembrane domain and the helix-4 of S1PR1, leads to S1PR1 internalization and degradation, preventing S1P binding and downstream signaling. This mechanism results in the temporary retention of lymphocytes within the lymph organs, enhancing the chances of successful lymphocyte activation, especially if the initial activation signal was weak. Upon antigen encounter or type I interferon stimulation in lymphoid organs, S1PR1 expression is decreased through CD69 interaction and downregulation of the transcription factor Kruppel‑like factor 2. Effector T cells eventually re-express S1PR1 to exit the lymph node and enter peripheral tissues. However, increased S1P levels in lymphoid tissues, due to inhibition of S1P lyase, inflammation, or synthetic S1PR1 ligands like FTY720, can block T cell egress by dissipating the S1P gradient, inducing S1PR1 internalization, and enhancing endothelial junctional contacts to close egress ports.

==== Immune cell regulation ====
S1PR1 activation is heavily involved in immune cell regulation and development. Sphingosine-1-phosphate receptor 1 is also involved in immune-modulation and directly involved in suppression of innate immune responses from T cells. Depending on the G protein coupled with the S1PR1, diverse cellular effects are achieved: G_{αi} and G_{αo} modulate cellular survival, proliferation and motility; G_{α12} and G_{α13} modulate cytoskeletal remodeling and cell-shape changes and G_{αq} modulates several cellular effector functions. All the intracellular functions occur via the interaction with Gαi and Gαo: these two proteins recruit other proteins for downstream amplification of the signal. The main downstream effector functions of S1P-S1PR1 system are as follows:

1. The phosphatidylinositol 3-kinase (PI3K) and the lipid dependent protein kinase B (PKB) signaling pathway increases the survival of lymphocytes and other immune cells by inhibiting apoptosis.
2. Phosphoinositide 3-kinase (PI3K) and the GTPase RAC are responsible of the lymphocytes migration and their interactions with other cells or with connective-tissue surfaces. S1PR1-deficient thymocytes do not emigrate from the thymus, resulting in an increased numbers of mature thymocytes in the thymus and in medullary hyperplasia, and few S1PR1-deficient T cells can be detected in the blood, lymph nodes, spleen or non-lymphoid organs in these mouse models. The proliferation of immune cells is due to S1P-mediated signals via the GTPase RAS and extracellular-signal regulated kinase (ERK). IV) The Phospholipase C (PLC)-induced increases in intracellular calcium levels allow the secretion of cytokines and other immune mediators.

=== Vasculogenesis ===
S1PR1 is one of the main receptors responsible for vascular growth and development, at least during embryogenesis. In vascular endothelial cells the binding of S1P to S1PR1 induces migration, proliferation, cell survival and morphogenesis into capillary-like structures. Moreover, the binding of S1P to S1PR1 is implicated in the formation of cell-cell adherens junctions, therefore inhibiting paracellular permeability of solutes and macromolecules. It was also shown in vivo that S1P synergizes with angiogenic factors such as FGF-2 and VEGF in inducing angiogenesis and vascular maturation through S1PR1. Liu et al. (2000) showed that S1PR1-KO mice died during development due to a defect in vascular stabilization, suggesting that this receptor is essential for vascular development. In conclusion, several evidences confirm that S1P via S1PR1 is a potent regulator of vascular growth and development, at least during embryogenesis.

== Clinical significance ==
=== Cancer ===
S1PR1 is involved in the motility of cancer cells upon stimulation by S1P. The signal pathway involves RAC-CDC42 and correlates with ERK1 and ERK2 activation. The RAC-CDC42 pathway leads to cell migration, whereas the ERK pathway leads to proliferation and neovascularization demonstrated that S1PR1 is strongly induced in endothelial cells during tumor angiogenesis and a siRNA against S1PR1 was able to inhibit angiogenesis and tumor growth. S1PR1 is also involved in other types of cancer: fibrosarcoma cells migrate upon activation of S1PR1 by S1P via RAC1–CDC42 dependent pathway) and ovarian cancer cell invasion involves S1PR1 or S1PR3 and calcium mobilization.

=== Multiple sclerosis ===
S1PR1 is involved in multiple sclerosis. Fingolimod, a drug which internalizes the receptor, is approved as a disease modifying agent in Multiple sclerosis. There are other Sphingosine-1-phosphate receptor modulators. Van Doorn et al. (2010) observed a strong increase in S1PR1 (and S1PR3) expression in hypertrophic astrocytes both in the active and inactive Multiple sclerosis lesions from patients compared to the unaffected patients.

== Evolution ==
=== Paralogues for S1PR1 Gene ===
- S1PR3
- S1PR5
- S1PR2
- S1PR4
- LPAR1
- LPAR2
- LPAR3
- CNR1
- GPR6
- GPR12
- MC4R
- MC5R
- CNR2
- MC3R
- GPR3
- MC2R
- MC1R
- GPR119

== Interactions ==
S1PR1 has been shown to interact with 5-HT1A receptor, GNAI1, and GNAI3.

== See also ==
- Lysophospholipid receptor
