= GPR12 =

Protein-coding gene in the species Homo sapiens

Identifiers
- Aliases: GPR12, GPCR12, GPCR21, PPP1R84, G protein-coupled receptor 12
- External IDs: OMIM: 600752; MGI: 101909; GeneCards: GPR12

Gene location (Human)
Chr.	Chromosome 13 (human)
Band	13q12.13	Start	26,755,200 bp
Band	13q12.13	End	26,760,786 bp

Gene location (Mouse)
Chr.	Chromosome 5 (mouse)
Band	5|5 G3	Start	146,519,208 bp
Band	5|5 G3	End	146,522,049 bp
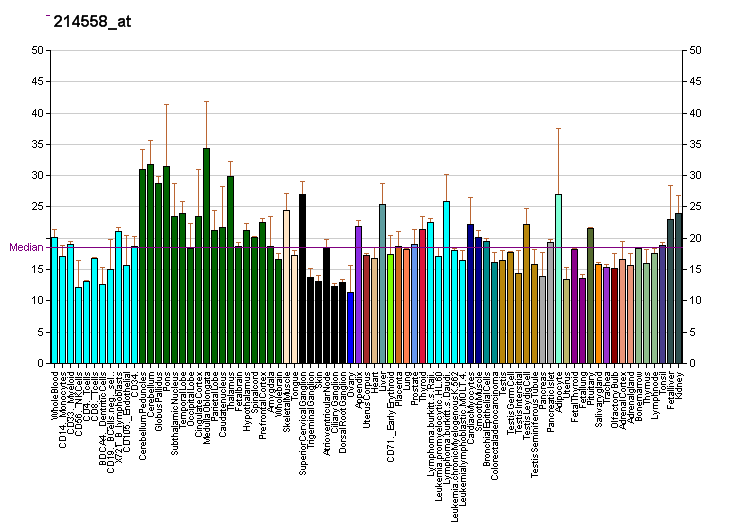
RNA expression pattern
Bgee	Human / Mouse (ortholog); Top expressed in: ganglionic eminence; cerebellar hemisphere; right hemisphere of cerebellum; nucleus accumbens; caudate nucleus; prefrontal cortex; putamen; Brodmann area 9; cingulate gyrus; anterior cingulate cortex / Top expressed in: perirhinal cortex; entorhinal cortex; CA3 field; primary visual cortex; superior frontal gyrus; dentate gyrus of hippocampal formation granule cell; hippocampus proper; Region I of hippocampus proper; dorsal striatum; nucleus of stria terminalis; More reference expression data
BioGPS	More reference expression data
Gene ontology
Molecular function	G protein-coupled receptor activity; signal transducer activity; phosphatidylcholine binding
Cellular component	integral component of membrane; plasma membrane; integral component of plasma membrane; membrane
Biological process	G protein-coupled receptor signaling pathway; cellular calcium ion homeostasis; signal transduction
Sources:Amigo / QuickGO
Orthologs
Databases	NCBI: entry; OMA: entry
Species	Human	Mouse
Entrez	2835	14738
Ensembl	ENSG00000132975	ENSMUSG00000041468
UniProt	P47775	P35412
RefSeq (mRNA)	NM_005288	NM_001010941; NM_008151; NM_001359055; NM_001359056; NM_001359057 NM_001359058
RefSeq (protein)	NP_005279	NP_001010941; NP_032177; NP_001345984; NP_001345985; NP_001345986 NP_001345987
Location (UCSC)	Chr 13: 26.76 – 26.76 Mb	Chr 5: 146.52 – 146.52 Mb
PubMed search
- Wikidata
View/Edit Human	View/Edit Mouse

Probable G-protein coupled receptor 12 is a protein that in humans is encoded by the GPR12 gene.

The gene product of GPR12 is an orphan receptor, meaning that its endogenous ligand is currently unknown. Gene disruption of GPR12 in mice results in dyslipidemia and obesity.

== Ligands ==
Inverse agonists

- Cannabidiol

== Evolution ==
=== Paralogues ===
- GPR6
- GPR3
- S1PR5
- CNR1
- CNR2
- MC4R
- S1PR1
- MC3R
- MC2R
- S1PR2
- MC1R
- S1PR3
- LPAR2
- MC5R
- LPAR1
- S1PR4
- LPAR3
- GPR119
