= S1PR2 =

Protein and coding gene in humans

Identifiers
- Aliases: S1PR2, AGR16, EDG-5, EDG5, Gpcr13, H218, LPB2, S1P2, DFNB68, sphingosine-1-phosphate receptor 2
- External IDs: OMIM: 605111; MGI: 99569; GeneCards: S1PR2
Available structures
PDB	Ortholog search: PDBe RCSB
PDB	List of PDB id codes 1ZTI

Gene location (Human)
Chr.	Chromosome 19 (human)
Band	19p13.2	Start	10,221,433 bp
Band	19p13.2	End	10,231,331 bp

Gene location (Mouse)
Chr.	Chromosome 9 (mouse)
Band	9 A3|9 7.68 cM	Start	20,873,657 bp
Band	9 A3|9 7.68 cM	End	20,888,077 bp
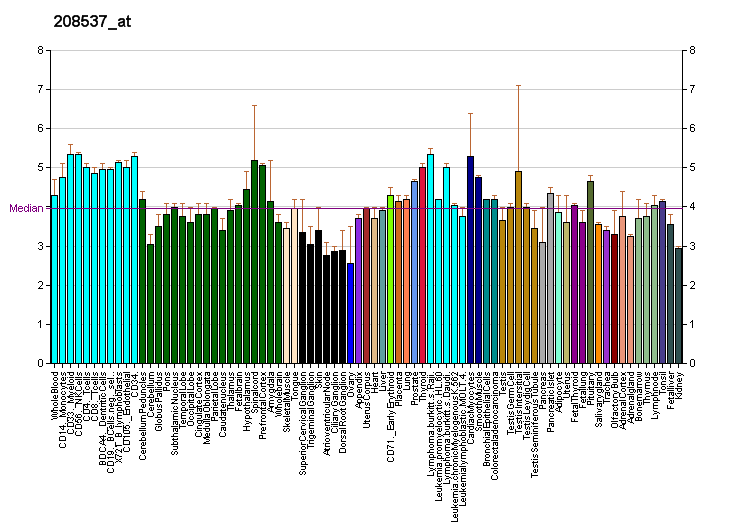
RNA expression pattern
Bgee	Human / Mouse (ortholog); Top expressed in: right ventricle; vena cava; stromal cell of endometrium; parotid gland; placenta; upper lobe of left lung; sperm; left uterine tube; gastric mucosa; canal of the cervix / Top expressed in: decidua; efferent ductule; vas deferens; dermis; left lung lobe; calvaria; otic vesicle; abdominal wall; tracheobronchial tree; lumbar spinal ganglion; More reference expression data
BioGPS	More reference expression data
Gene ontology
Molecular function	signal transducer activity; lipid binding; G protein-coupled receptor binding; G protein-coupled receptor activity; integrin binding; protein binding; sphingosine-1-phosphate receptor activity
Cellular component	membrane; integral component of membrane; plasma membrane
Biological process	actin cytoskeleton reorganization; positive regulation of establishment of endothelial barrier; positive regulation of cell population proliferation; G protein-coupled receptor signaling pathway; filopodium assembly; signal transduction; sphingosine-1-phosphate receptor signaling pathway; positive regulation of peptidyl-threonine phosphorylation; negative regulation of excitatory postsynaptic potential
Sources:Amigo / QuickGO
Orthologs
Databases	NCBI: entry; OMA: entry
Species	Human	Mouse
Entrez	9294	14739
Ensembl	ENSG00000267534	ENSMUSG00000043895
UniProt	O95136	P52592
RefSeq (mRNA)	NM_004230	NM_010333
RefSeq (protein)	NP_004221	NP_034463
Location (UCSC)	Chr 19: 10.22 – 10.23 Mb	Chr 9: 20.87 – 20.89 Mb
PubMed search
- Wikidata
View/Edit Human	View/Edit Mouse

Sphingosine-1-phosphate receptor 2, also known as S1PR2 or S1P_{2}, is a human gene which encodes a G protein-coupled receptor which binds the lipid signaling molecule sphingosine 1-phosphate (S1P).

== Function ==
This protein participates in sphingosine 1-phosphate-induced cell proliferation, survival, and transcriptional activation. It has also been shown to interact with Nogo-A (RTN4), an neurite outgrowth inhibitor. S1PR2 is expressed in neuronal and vascular cells and is crucial for the migration and growth of developing and injured neuronal and vascular system.

== Evolution ==
=== Paralogues ===
- S1PR1
- S1PR3
- S1PR5
- S1PR4
- LPAR2
- LPAR1
- LPAR3
- CNR1
- GPR6
- MC3R
- GPR12
- GPR3
- MC4R
- MC1R
- CNR2
- MC5R
- MC2R
- GPR119

== See also ==
- Lysophospholipid receptor
