= Melanocortin 5 receptor =

Protein found in humans

MC5R

Identifiers
- Aliases: MC5R, MC2, Melanocortin 5 receptor
- External IDs: OMIM: 600042; MGI: 99420; GeneCards: MC5R

Gene location (Human)
Chr.	Chromosome 18 (human)
Band	18p11.21	Start	13,824,149 bp
Band	18p11.21	End	13,827,323 bp

Gene location (Mouse)
Chr.	Chromosome 18 (mouse)
Band	18 E2|18 41.46 cM	Start	68,470,667 bp
Band	18 E2|18 41.46 cM	End	68,475,517 bp
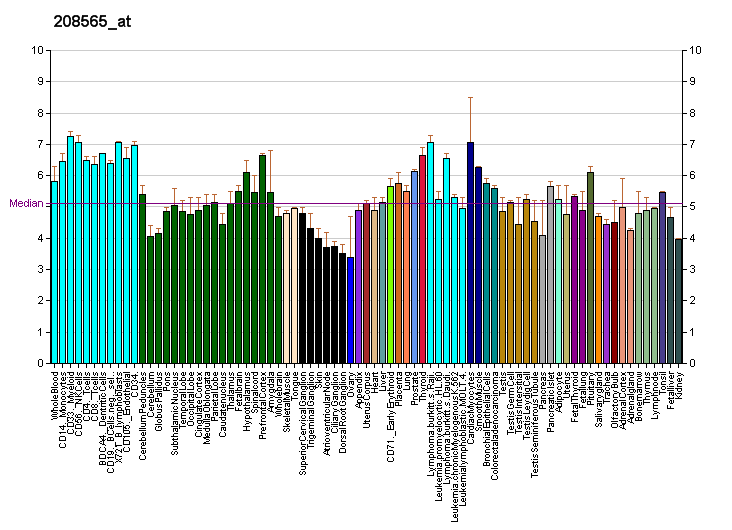
RNA expression pattern
Bgee	Human / Mouse (ortholog); Top expressed in: gonad; testicle; prefrontal cortex; tonsil; cingulate gyrus; anterior cingulate cortex; skin of abdomen; left adrenal cortex; lymph node; exocrine gland / Top expressed in: lacrimal gland; lumbar subsegment of spinal cord; lip; skin of external ear; triceps brachii muscle; skin of abdomen; Ileal epithelium; muscle of thigh; perirhinal cortex; ankle; More reference expression data
BioGPS	More reference expression data
Gene ontology
Molecular function	melanocortin receptor activity; protein binding; G protein-coupled receptor activity; signal transducer activity; hormone binding
Cellular component	integral component of membrane; plasma membrane; integral component of plasma membrane; membrane; intracellular anatomical structure
Biological process	G protein-coupled receptor signaling pathway, coupled to cyclic nucleotide second messenger; signal transduction; G protein-coupled receptor signaling pathway; adenylate cyclase-activating G protein-coupled receptor signaling pathway
Sources:Amigo / QuickGO
Orthologs
Databases	NCBI: entry; OMA: entry
Species	Human	Mouse
Entrez	4161	17203
Ensembl	ENSG00000176136	ENSMUSG00000007480
UniProt	P33032	P41149
RefSeq (mRNA)	NM_005913	NM_013596
RefSeq (protein)	NP_005904	NP_038624
Location (UCSC)	Chr 18: 13.82 – 13.83 Mb	Chr 18: 68.47 – 68.48 Mb
PubMed search
- Wikidata
View/Edit Human	View/Edit Mouse

Melanocortin 5 receptor (MC_{5}R) is a protein that in humans is encoded by the MC5R gene. It is located on the chromosome 18 in the human genome. When the MC_{5}R was disrupted in transgenic mice, it induced disruption of their exocrine glands and resulted in decreased production of sebum.

== Physiology ==
MC_{5}R is necessary for normal sebum production. Stimulation of MC_{5}R promotes fatty acid oxidation in skeletal muscle and lipolysis in adipocytes. MC_{5}R is essential for erythrocyte differentiation. MC_{5}R is involved in inflammation. MC_{5}R helps maintain thermal homeostasis. Stimulation of the MC5R in skeletal muscle causes glucose uptake. In vitro, MC5R agonism is cardioprotective and kidney protective.

MC_{5}R is expressed in the brain at different levels depending on physical activity.

=== Pheromones ===
MC_{5}R is heavily expressed in the preputial gland in mice (a modified sebaceous gland involved in pheromone production). MC_{5}R deficiency in male mice decreases aggressive behavior, promotes defensive behavior and encourages other male mice to attack MC_{5}R-deficient males through pheromonal signals.

=== MRAP ===
Melanocortin 2 receptor accessory protein (MRAP) traps MC_{5}R protein inside cells.

== Evolution ==
=== Paralogues ===
- MC4R
- MC3R
- MC1R
- MC2R
- S1PR1
- LPAR1
- S1PR3
- GPR12
- LPAR2
- GPR3
- S1PR2
- GPR6
- GPR119
- LPAR3
- CNR1
- S1PR5
- S1PR4
- CNR2

== See also ==
- Melanocortin receptor
