= Cannabinoid receptor 2 =

Mammalian protein found in humans

CNR2
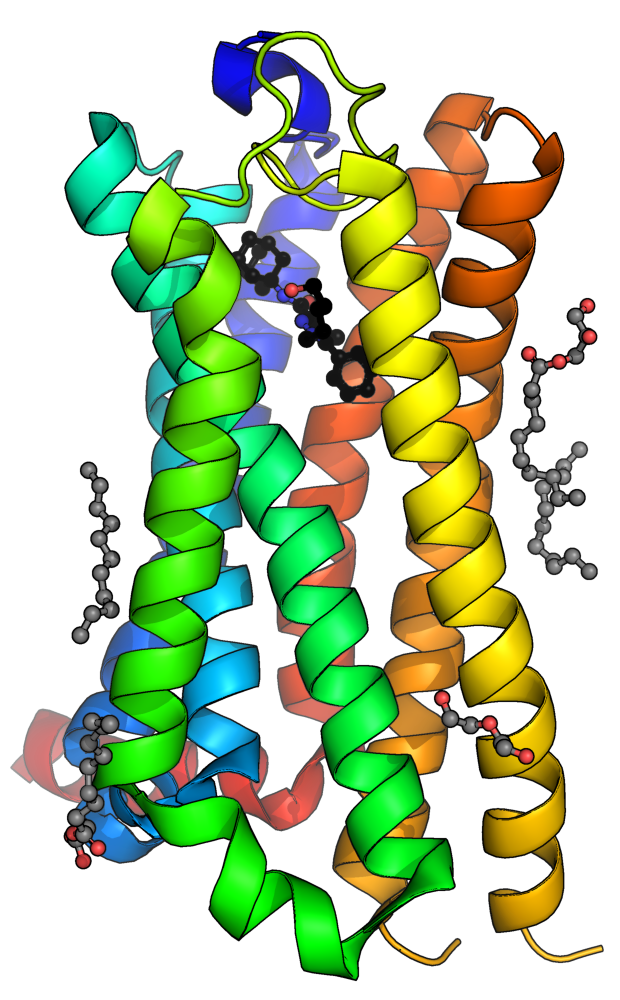

Identifiers
- Aliases: CNR2, CB-2, CB2, CX5, Cannabinoid receptor type 2, cannabinoid receptor 2
- External IDs: OMIM: 605051; MGI: 104650; GeneCards: CNR2
Available structures
PDB	Ortholog search: PDBe RCSB
PDB	List of PDB id codes 2KI9

Gene location (Human)
Chr.	Chromosome 1 (human)
Band	1p36.11	Start	23,870,515 bp
Band	1p36.11	End	23,913,362 bp

Gene location (Mouse)
Chr.	Chromosome 4 (mouse)
Band	4|4 D3	Start	135,622,705 bp
Band	4|4 D3	End	135,647,518 bp
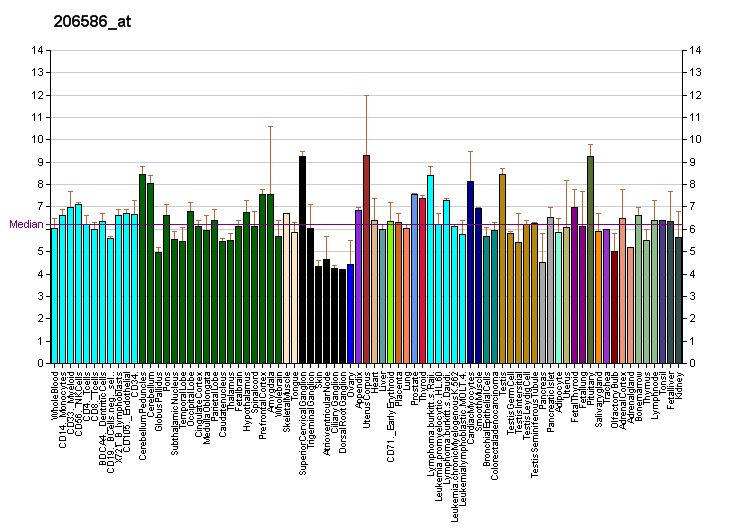
RNA expression pattern
Bgee	Human / Mouse (ortholog); Top expressed in: spleen; lymph node; tibialis anterior muscle; mucosa of ileum; granulocyte; deltoid muscle; blood; cecum; appendix; superior surface of tongue / Top expressed in: granulocyte; mesenteric lymph nodes; spleen; blood; stroma of bone marrow; subcutaneous adipose tissue; thymus; tibiofemoral joint; right lung lobe; left colon; More reference expression data
BioGPS	More reference expression data
Gene ontology
Molecular function	G protein-coupled receptor activity; signal transducer activity; cannabinoid receptor activity
Cellular component	integral component of membrane; perikaryon; cell projection; membrane; extrinsic component of cytoplasmic side of plasma membrane; plasma membrane; integral component of plasma membrane; soma; dendrite; neuron projection
Biological process	negative regulation of nitric-oxide synthase activity; negative regulation of mast cell activation; cannabinoid signaling pathway; response to amphetamine; G protein-coupled receptor signaling pathway, coupled to cyclic nucleotide second messenger; negative regulation of action potential; response to lipopolysaccharide; negative regulation of synaptic transmission, GABAergic; immune response; sensory perception of pain; inflammatory response; negative regulation of inflammatory response; signal transduction; leukocyte chemotaxis; G protein-coupled receptor signaling pathway
Sources:Amigo / QuickGO
Orthologs
Databases	NCBI: entry; OMA: entry
Species	Human	Mouse
Entrez	1269	12802
Ensembl	ENSG00000188822	ENSMUSG00000062585
UniProt	P34972	P47936
RefSeq (mRNA)	NM_001841	NM_009924; NM_001305278
RefSeq (protein)	NP_001832	NP_001292207; NP_034054
Location (UCSC)	Chr 1: 23.87 – 23.91 Mb	Chr 4: 135.62 – 135.65 Mb
PubMed search
- Wikidata
View/Edit Human	View/Edit Mouse

The cannabinoid receptor 2 (CB2) is a G protein-coupled receptor from the cannabinoid receptor family that in humans is encoded by the CNR2 gene. It is closely related to the cannabinoid receptor 1 (CB1), which is largely responsible for the efficacy of endocannabinoid-mediated presynaptic-inhibition, the psychoactive properties of tetrahydrocannabinol (THC), the active agent in cannabis, and other phytocannabinoids (plant cannabinoids). The principal endogenous ligand for the CB2 receptor is 2-arachidonoylglycerol (2-AG).

CB2 was cloned in 1993 by a research group from Cambridge looking for a second cannabinoid receptor that could explain the pharmacological properties of tetrahydrocannabinol. The receptor was identified among cDNAs based on its similarity in amino acid sequence to the CB1 receptor, discovered in 1990. The discovery of this receptor helped provide a molecular explanation for the established effects of cannabinoids on the immune system.

== Structure ==
The CB2 receptor is encoded by the CNR2 gene. Approximately 360 amino acids comprise the human CB2 receptor, making it somewhat shorter than the 473-amino-acid-long CB1 receptor.

As is commonly seen in G protein-coupled receptors, the CB2 receptor has seven transmembrane spanning domains, a glycosylated N-terminus, and an intracellular C-terminus. The C-terminus of CB2 receptors appears to play a critical role in the regulation of ligand-induced receptor desensitization and downregulation following repeated agonist application, perhaps causing the receptor to become less responsive to particular ligands.

The human CB1 and the CB2 receptors possess approximately 44% amino acid similarity. When only the transmembrane regions of the receptors are considered, however, the amino acid similarity between the two receptor subtypes is approximately 68%. The amino acid sequence of the CB2 receptor is less highly conserved across human and rodent species as compared to the amino acid sequence of the CB1 receptor. Based on computer modeling, ligand interactions with CB2 receptor residues S3.31 and F5.46 appears to determine differences between CB_{1} and CB_{2} receptor selectivity. In CB_{2} receptors, lipophilic groups interact with the F5.46 residue, allowing them to form a hydrogen bond with the S3.31 residue. These interactions induce a conformational change in the receptor structure, which triggers the activation of various intracellular signaling pathways. Further research is needed to determine the exact molecular mechanisms of signaling pathway activation.

== Mechanism ==
Like the CB1 receptors, CB2 receptors inhibit the activity of adenylyl cyclase through their Gi/Go_{α} subunits. CB2 can also couple to stimulatory Gα_{s} subunits leading to an increase of intracellular cAMP, as has been shown for human leukocytes. Through their G_{βγ} subunits, CB2 receptors are also known to be coupled to the MAPK-ERK pathway, a complex and highly conserved signal transduction pathway, which regulates a number of cellular processes in mature and developing tissues. Activation of the MAPK-ERK pathway by CB2 receptor agonists acting through the G_{βγ} subunit ultimately results in changes in cell migration.

Five recognized cannabinoids are produced endogenously: arachidonoylethanolamine (anandamide), 2-arachidonoyl glycerol (2-AG), 2-arachidonyl glyceryl ether (noladin ether), virodhamine, as well as N-arachidonoyl-dopamine (NADA). Many of these ligands appear to exhibit properties of functional selectivity at the CB2 receptor: 2-AG activates the MAPK-ERK pathway, while noladin inhibits adenylyl cyclase.

== Expression ==
=== Dispute ===
Originally it was thought that the CB2 receptor was only expressed in peripheral tissue while the CB1 receptor is the endogenous receptor on neurons. Recent work with immunohistochemical staining has shown expression within neurons. Subsequently, it was shown that CB2 knock out mice produced the same immunohistochemical staining, indicating the presence of the CB2 receptor where none was expressed. This has created a long history of debate as to whether the CB2 receptor is expressed in the CNS. A new mouse model was described in 2014 that expresses a fluorescent protein whenever CB2 is expressed within a cell. This has the potential to resolve questions about the expression of CB2 receptors in various tissues.

=== Immune system ===
Initial investigation of CB2 receptor expression patterns focused on the presence of CB2 receptors in the peripheral tissues of the immune system, and found the CB_{2} receptor mRNA in the spleen, tonsils, and thymus gland. CB_{2} expression in human peripheral blood mononuclear cells at protein level has been confirmed by whole cell radioligand binding. Northern blot analysis further indicates the expression of the CNR2 gene in immune tissues, where they are primarily responsible for mediating cytokine release. These receptors were localized on immune cells such as monocytes, macrophages, B-cells, and T-cells.

=== Brain ===
Further investigation into the expression patterns of the CB2 receptors revealed that CB2 receptor gene transcripts are also expressed in the brain, though not as densely as the CB_{1} receptor and located on different cells. Unlike the CB1 receptor, in the brain, CB2 receptors are found primarily on microglia. The CB2 receptor is expressed in some neurons within the central nervous system (e.g.; the brainstem), but the expression is very low. CB2s are expressed on some rat retinal cell types. Functional CB2 receptors are expressed in neurons of the ventral tegmental area and the hippocampus, arguing for a widespread expression and functional relevance in the CNS and in particular in neuronal signal transmission.

=== Gastrointestinal system ===
CB2 receptors are also found throughout the gastrointestinal system, where they modulate intestinal inflammatory response. Thus, CB2 receptor is a potential therapeutic target for inflammatory bowel diseases, such as Crohn's disease and ulcerative colitis. The role of endocannabinoids, as such, play an important role in inhibiting unnecessary immune action upon the natural gut flora. Dysfunction of this system, perhaps from excess FAAH activity, could result in IBD. CB_{2} activation may also have a role in the treatment of irritable bowel syndrome. Cannabinoid receptor agonists reduce gut motility in IBS patients.

=== Peripheral nervous system ===
Application of CB2-specific antagonists has found that these receptors are also involved in mediating analgesic effects in the peripheral nervous system. However, these receptors are not expressed by nociceptive sensory neurons, and at present are believed to exist on an undetermined, non-neuronal cell. Possible candidates include mast cells, known to facilitate the inflammatory response. Cannabinoid mediated inhibition of these responses may cause a decrease in the perception of noxious-stimuli.

== Function ==
=== Immune system ===
Primary research on the functioning of the CB2 receptor has focused on the receptor's effects on the immunological activity of leukocytes. To be specific, this receptor has been implicated in a variety of modulatory functions, including immune suppression, induction of apoptosis, and induction of cell migration. Through their inhibition of adenylyl cyclase via their Gi/Go_{α} subunits, CB2 receptor agonists cause a reduction in the intracellular levels of cyclic adenosine monophosphate (cAMP). CB2 also signals via Gα_{s} and increases intracellular cAMP in human leukocytes, leading to induction of interleukins 6 and 10. Although the exact role of the cAMP cascade in the regulation of immune responses is currently under debate, laboratories have previously demonstrated that inhibition of adenylyl cyclase by CB2 receptor agonists results in a reduction in the binding of transcription factor CREB (cAMP response element-binding protein) to DNA. This reduction causes changes in the expression of critical immunoregulatory genes and ultimately suppression of immune function.

Later studies examining the effect of synthetic cannabinoid agonist JWH-015 on CB2 receptors revealed that changes in cAMP levels result in the phosphorylation of leukocyte receptor tyrosine kinase at Tyr-505, leading to an inhibition of T cell receptor signaling. Thus, CB2 agonists may also be useful for treatment of inflammation and pain, and are currently being investigated, in particular for forms of pain that do not respond well to conventional treatments, such as neuropathic pain. Consistent with these findings are studies that demonstrate increased CB2 receptor expression in the spinal cord, dorsal root ganglion, and activated microglia in the rodent neuropathic pain model, as well as on human hepatocellular carcinoma tumor samples.

CB2 receptors have also been implicated in the regulation of homing and retention of marginal zone B cells. A study using knock-out mice found that CB2 receptor is essential for the maintenance of both MZ B cells and their precursor T2-MZP, though not their development. Both B cells and their precursors lacking this receptor were found in reduced numbers, explained by the secondary finding that 2-AG signaling was demonstrated to induce proper B cell migration to the MZ. Without the receptor, there was an undesirable spike in the blood concentration of MZ B lineage cells and a significant reduction in the production of IgM. While the mechanism behind this process is not fully understood, the researchers suggested that this process may be due to the activation-dependent decrease in cAMP concentration, leading to reduced transcription of genes regulated by CREB, indirectly increasing TCR signaling and IL-2 production. Together, these findings demonstrate that the endocannabinoid system may be exploited to enhance immunity to certain pathogens and autoimmune diseases.

=== Clinical applications ===
CB2 receptors may have possible therapeutic roles in the treatment of neurodegenerative disorders such as Alzheimer's disease. Specifically, the CB2 agonist JWH-015 was shown to induce macrophages to remove native beta-amyloid protein from frozen human tissues. In patients with Alzheimer's disease, beta-amyloid proteins form aggregates known as senile plaques, which disrupt neural functioning.

Changes in endocannabinoid levels and/or CB2 receptor expressions have been reported in almost all diseases affecting humans, ranging from cardiovascular, gastrointestinal, liver, kidney, neurodegenerative, psychiatric, bone, skin, autoimmune, lung disorders to pain and cancer. The prevalence of this trend suggests that modulating CB2 receptor activity by either selective CB2 receptor agonists or inverse agonists/antagonists depending on the disease and its progression holds unique therapeutic potential for these pathologies

=== Modulation of cocaine reward ===
Researchers investigated the effects of CB2 agonists on cocaine self-administration in mice. Systemic administration of JWH-133 reduced the number of self-infusions of cocaine in mice, as well as reducing locomotor activity and the break point (maximum amount of level presses to obtain cocaine). Local injection of JWH-133 into the nucleus accumbens was found to produce the same effects as systemic administration. Systemic administration of JWH-133 also reduced basal and cocaine-induced elevations of extracellular dopamine in the nucleus accumbens. These findings were mimicked by another, structurally different CB2 agonist, GW-405,833, and were reversed by the administration of a CB2 antagonist, AM-630.

== Ligands ==
Many selective ligands for the CB2 receptor are now available.

=== Agonists ===
- Minocycline
- AM404

=== Partial agonists ===
- GW-405,833

=== Unspecified efficacy agonists ===
- AM-1241
- HU-308
- JWH-015
- JWH-133
- L-759,633
- L-759,656

==== Herbal ====
- Echinacea purpurea

=== Inverse agonists ===
- AM-630
- BML-190
- JTE-907
- SR-144,528
- APD371
- Raloxifene

== Binding affinities ==
	CB_{1} affinity (K_{i})	Efficacy towards CB_{1}	CB_{2} affinity (K_{i})	Efficacy towards CB_{2}	Type	References
Anandamide	78 nM	Partial agonist	370 nM	Partial agonist	Endogenous	
N-Arachidonoyl dopamine	250 nM	Agonist	12000 nM	?	Endogenous	
2-Arachidonoylglycerol	58.3 nM	Full agonist	145 nM	Full agonist	Endogenous	
2-Arachidonyl glyceryl ether	21 nM	Full agonist	480 nM	Full agonist	Endogenous	
Tetrahydrocannabinol	10 nM	Partial agonist	24 nM	Partial agonist	Phytogenic	
EGCG	33.6 μM	Agonist	>50 μM	?	Phytogenic	
EGC	35.7 μM	Agonist	>50 μM	?	Phytogenic	
ECG	47.3 μM	Agonist	>50 μM	?	Phytogenic	
N-alkylamide	-	-	<100 nM	Partial agonist	Phytogenic	
β-Caryophyllene	-	-	<200 nM	Full agonist	Phytogenic	
Falcarinol	<1 μM	Inverse agonist	?	?	Phytogenic	
Rutamarin	-	-	<10 μM	?	Phytogenic	
3,3'-Diindolylmethane	-	-	1 μM	Partial Agonist	Phytogenic	
AM-1221	52.3 nM	Agonist	0.28 nM	Agonist	Synthetic	
AM-1235	1.5 nM	Agonist	20.4 nM	Agonist	Synthetic	
AM-2232	0.28 nM	Agonist	1.48 nM	Agonist	Synthetic	
UR-144	150 nM	Full agonist	1.8 nM	Full agonist	Synthetic	
JWH-007	9.0 nM	Agonist	2.94 nM	Agonist	Synthetic	
JWH-015	383 nM	Agonist	13.8 nM	Agonist	Synthetic	
JWH-018	9.00 ± 5.00 nM	Full agonist	2.94 ± 2.65 nM	Full agonist	Synthetic	

== Evolution ==
=== Paralogues ===
- CNR1
- GPR12
- GPR6
- S1PR1
- S1PR4
- S1PR3
- S1PR5
- S1PR2
- LPAR1
- GPR3
- LPAR3
- LPAR2
- MC4R
- MC5R
- GPR119
- MC1R
- MC3R
- MC2R
