= Lysophospholipid receptor =

Type of G protein-coupled receptor

The lysophospholipid receptor (LPL-R) group are members of the G protein-coupled receptor family of integral membrane proteins that are important for lipid signaling. In humans, there are eleven LPL receptors, each encoded by a separate gene. These LPL receptor genes are also sometimes referred to as "Edg" (an acronym for endothelial differentiation gene).

== Ligands ==
The ligands for LPL-R group are the lysophospholipid extracellular signaling molecules, lysophosphatidic acid (LPA) and sphingosine 1-phosphate (S1P).

== Origin of name ==
The term lysophospholipid (LPL) refers to any phospholipid that is missing one of its two O-acyl chains. Thus, LPLs have a free alcohol in either the sn-1 or the sn-2 position. The prefix 'lyso-' comes from the fact that lysophospholipids were originally found to be hemolytic, however it is now used to refer generally to phospholipids missing an acyl chain. LPLs are usually the result of phospholipase A-type enzymatic activity on regular phospholipids such as phosphatidylcholine or phosphatidic acid, although they can also be generated by the acylation of glycerophospholipids or the phosphorylation of monoacylglycerols. Some LPLs serve important signaling functions such as lysophosphatidic acid.

== Function ==
LPL receptor ligands bind to and activate their cognate receptors located in the cell membrane. Depending on which ligand, receptor, and cell type is involved, the activated receptor can have a range of effects on the cell. These include primary effects of inhibition of adenylyl cyclase and release of calcium from the endoplasmic reticulum, as well as secondary effects of preventing apoptosis and increasing cell proliferation.

== Group members ==
The following is a list of the eleven known human LPL receptors:

Gene Symbol	IUPHAR Symbol	Gene / Protein Name	Agonist Ligand	Synonyms
LPAR1	272	lysophosphatidic acid receptor 1	LPA	EDG2
LPAR2	273	lysophosphatidic acid receptor 2	"	EDG4
LPAR3	274	lysophosphatidic acid receptor 3	"	EDG7
LPAR4	LPA_{4}	lysophosphatidic acid receptor 4	"	GPR23
LPAR5	LPA_{5}	lysophosphatidic acid receptor 5	"	GPR92
LPAR6	LPA_{6}	lysophosphatidic acid receptor 6	"	P2RY5
S1PR1	275	sphingosine-1-phosphate receptor 1	S1P	EDG1
S1PR2	276	sphingosine-1-phosphate receptor 2	"	EDG5
S1PR3	277	sphingosine-1-phosphate receptor 3	"	EDG3
S1PR4	278	sphingosine-1-phosphate receptor 4	"	EDG6
S1PR5	279	sphingosine-1-phosphate receptor 5	"	EDG8

== See also ==
- Lipid signaling
- Gintonin
