= LPAR1 =

Protein

Identifiers
- Aliases: LPAR1, receptor 1, lysophosphatidic acid receptor 1
- External IDs: OMIM: 602282; MGI: 108429; GeneCards: LPAR1
Available structures
PDB	Ortholog search: PDBe RCSB
PDB	List of PDB id codes 4Z34, 4Z35, 4Z36

Gene location (Mouse)
Chr.	Chromosome 4 (mouse)
Band	4 B3|4 32.2 cM	Start	58,435,255 bp
Band	4 B3|4 32.2 cM	End	58,553,898 bp
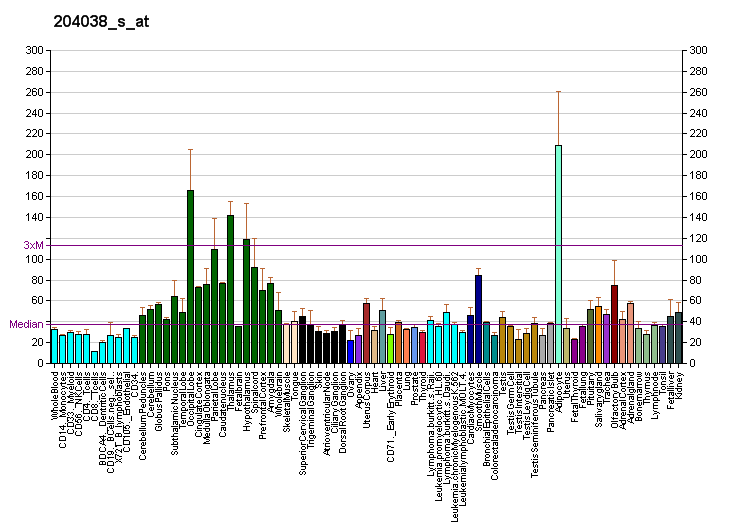

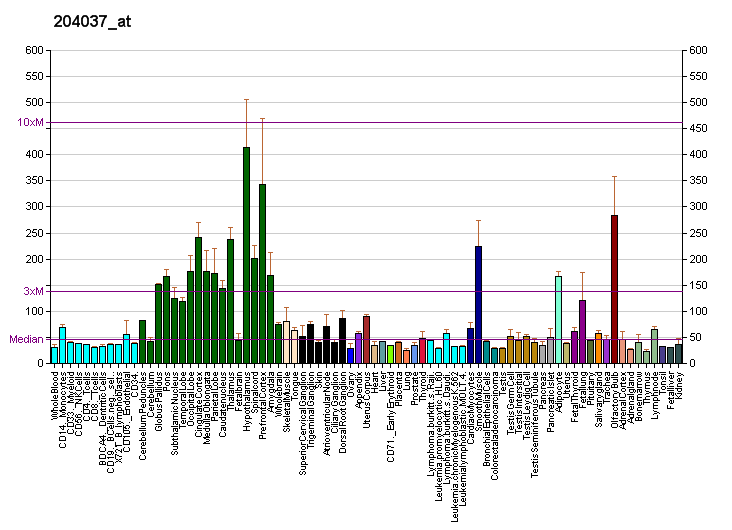

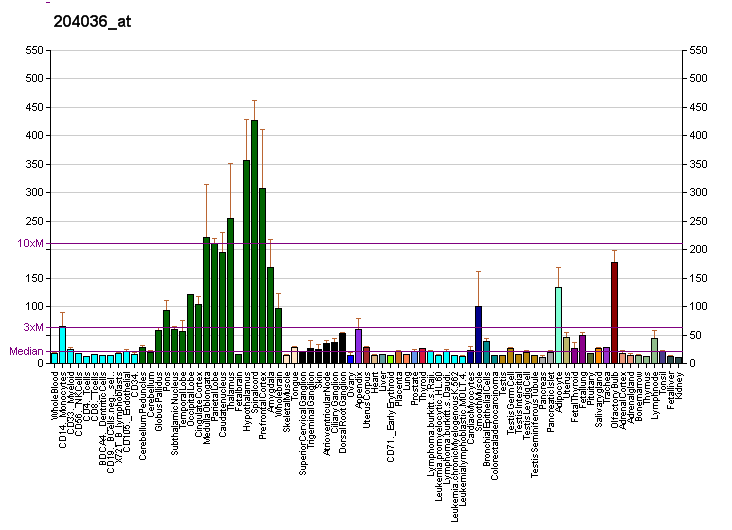
RNA expression pattern
Bgee	Human / Mouse (ortholog); n/a / Top expressed in: maxillary prominence; calvaria; mandibular prominence; optic nerve; autopod region; hand; foot; decidua; conjunctival fornix; utricle
BioGPS	More reference expression data
Gene ontology
Molecular function	lysophosphatidic acid binding; PDZ domain binding; G protein-coupled receptor activity; signal transducer activity; protein binding; lysophosphatidic acid receptor activity; G-protein alpha-subunit binding; phospholipid binding; lipid binding
Cellular component	cytoplasm; integral component of membrane; endosome; membrane; plasma membrane; dendritic spine; endocytic vesicle; integral component of plasma membrane; dendritic shaft; cell surface; soma; neuron projection
Biological process	positive regulation of Rho protein signal transduction; positive regulation of smooth muscle cell chemotaxis; G protein-coupled receptor signaling pathway; neurogenesis; positive regulation of cytosolic calcium ion concentration involved in phospholipase C-activating G protein-coupled signaling pathway; negative regulation of neuron projection development; positive regulation of cell death; adenylate cyclase-inhibiting G protein-coupled receptor signaling pathway; positive regulation of cytosolic calcium ion concentration; bleb assembly; positive regulation of dendritic spine development; activation of phospholipase C activity; cerebellum development; cellular response to 1-oleoyl-sn-glycerol 3-phosphate; brain development; regulation of cell shape; positive regulation of apoptotic process; cell chemotaxis; positive regulation of I-kappaB kinase/NF-kappaB signaling; myelination; oligodendrocyte development; corpus callosum development; cellular response to oxygen levels; positive regulation of stress fiber assembly; optic nerve development; positive regulation of MAPK cascade; signal transduction; negative regulation of cAMP-mediated signaling
Sources:Amigo / QuickGO
Orthologs
Databases	NCBI: entry; OMA: entry
Species	Human	Mouse
Entrez	1902	14745
Ensembl	ENSG00000198121	ENSMUSG00000038668
UniProt	Q92633	P61793
RefSeq (mRNA)	NM_001401; NM_057159	NM_001290486; NM_010336; NM_172989
RefSeq (protein)	NP_001392; NP_476500; NP_001338326; NP_001338327; NP_001338328 NP_001338329; NP_001338330; NP_001338331; NP_001338332; NP_001338333; NP_001338334; NP_001338335; NP_001338336; NP_001338337; NP_001338338; NP_001338339; NP_001338340; NP_001338341; NP_001338342; NP_001338343; NP_001338344; NP_001338345; NP_001338346; NP_001338347; NP_001338348; NP_001338349	NP_001277415; NP_034466; NP_766577
Location (UCSC)	n/a	Chr 4: 58.44 – 58.55 Mb
PubMed search
- Wikidata
View/Edit Human	View/Edit Mouse

Lysophosphatidic acid receptor 1 also known as LPA_{1} is a protein that in humans is encoded by the LPAR1 gene. LPA_{1} is a G protein-coupled receptor that binds the lipid signaling molecule lysophosphatidic acid (LPA).

== Function ==
The integral membrane protein encoded by this gene is a lysophosphatidic acid (LPA) receptor from a group known as EDG receptors. These receptors are members of the G protein-coupled receptor superfamily. Utilized by LPA for cell signaling, EDG receptors mediate diverse biologic functions, including proliferation, platelet aggregation, smooth muscle contraction, inhibition of neuroblastoma cell differentiation, chemotaxis, and tumor cell invasion. Alternative splicing of this gene has been observed and two transcript variants have been described, each encoding identical proteins. An alternate translation start codon has been identified, which results in isoforms differing in the N-terminal extracellular tail. In addition, an alternate polyadenylation site has been reported.

== Cancer ==
LPAR1 gene has been detected progressively overexpressed in Human papillomavirus-positive neoplastic keratinocytes derived from uterine cervical preneoplastic lesions at different levels of malignancy. For this reason, this gene is likely to be associated with tumorigenesis and may be a potential prognostic marker for uterine cervical preneoplastic lesions progression.

== Evolution ==
=== Paralogues ===
- LPAR2
- LPAR3
- S1PR1
- S1PR3
- S1PR5
- S1PR4
- S1PR2
- CNR1
- MC3R
- MC5R
- MC4R
- GPR12
- MC2R
- GPR6
- CNR2
- GPR3
- MC1R
- GPR119

== See also ==
- Lysophospholipid receptor
