= S1PR4 =

Protein-coding gene in the species Homo sapiens

Identifiers
- Aliases: S1PR4, EDG6, LPC1, S1P4, SLP4, sphingosine-1-phosphate receptor 4
- External IDs: OMIM: 603751; MGI: 1333809; GeneCards: S1PR4
Available structures
PDB	Ortholog search: PDBe RCSB
PDB	List of PDB id codes 2DCO

Gene location (Human)
Chr.	Chromosome 19 (human)
Band	19p13.3	Start	3,172,346 bp
Band	19p13.3	End	3,180,332 bp

Gene location (Mouse)
Chr.	Chromosome 10 (mouse)
Band	10|10 C1	Start	81,333,581 bp
Band	10|10 C1	End	81,335,966 bp
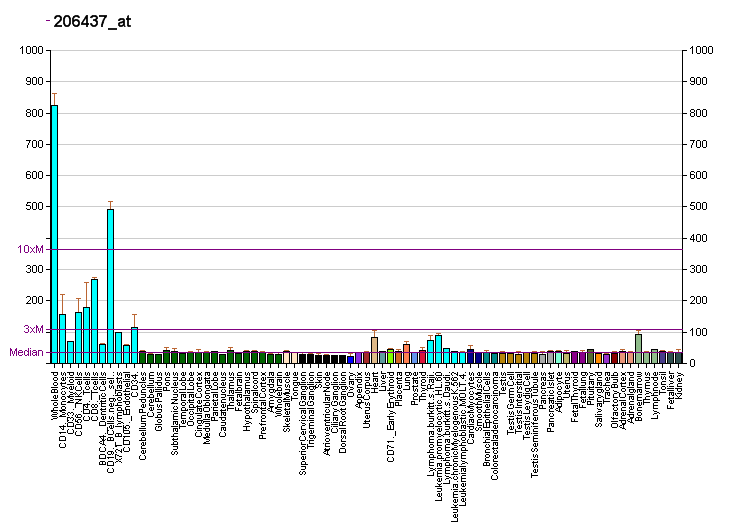

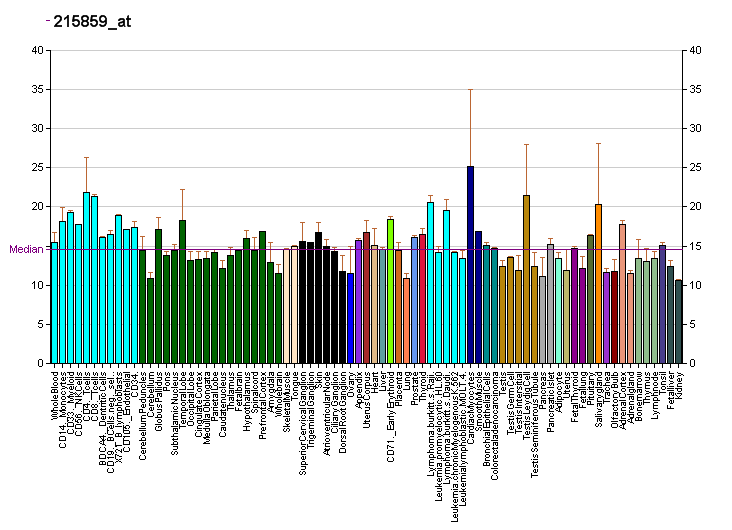
RNA expression pattern
Bgee	Human / Mouse (ortholog); Top expressed in: granulocyte; blood; monocyte; spleen; bone marrow; trabecular bone; bone marrow cell; lymph node; upper lobe of left lung; right lung / Top expressed in: granulocyte; blood; tibiofemoral joint; mesenteric lymph nodes; spleen; bone marrow; thymus; right lung; right lung lobe; subcutaneous adipose tissue; More reference expression data
BioGPS	More reference expression data
Gene ontology
Molecular function	sphingosine-1-phosphate receptor activity; G protein-coupled receptor activity; signal transducer activity; lipid binding
Cellular component	integral component of membrane; plasma membrane; integral component of plasma membrane; membrane; mitochondrion
Biological process	positive regulation of cytosolic calcium ion concentration; G protein-coupled receptor signaling pathway; adenylate cyclase-activating G protein-coupled receptor signaling pathway; activation of phospholipase C activity; immune response; sphingosine-1-phosphate receptor signaling pathway; signal transduction
Sources:Amigo / QuickGO
Orthologs
Databases	NCBI: entry; OMA: entry
Species	Human	Mouse
Entrez	8698	13611
Ensembl	ENSG00000125910	ENSMUSG00000044199
UniProt	O95977	Q9Z0L1
RefSeq (mRNA)	NM_003775	NM_010102
RefSeq (protein)	NP_003766	NP_034232
Location (UCSC)	Chr 19: 3.17 – 3.18 Mb	Chr 10: 81.33 – 81.34 Mb
PubMed search
- Wikidata
View/Edit Human	View/Edit Mouse

Sphingosine-1-phosphate receptor 4 also known as S1PR4 is a human gene which encodes a G protein-coupled receptor which binds the lipid signaling molecule sphingosine 1-phosphate (S1P). Hence this receptor is also known as S1P_{4}.

== Function ==
This gene is a member of the endothelial differentiation, G-protein-coupled (EDG) receptor gene family. EDG receptors bind lysophospholipids or lysosphingolipids as ligands, and are involved in cell signalling in many different cell types. This EDG receptor gene is intronless and is specifically expressed in the lymphoid tissue.

== Ligands ==
Agonists

- Sphingosine-1-phosphate
- CYM50308

== Evolution ==
=== Paralogues to S1PR4 Gene ===
- S1PR5
- S1PR3
- S1PR1
- S1PR2
- LPAR2
- LPAR1
- LPAR3
- CNR1
- GPR6
- CNR2
- GPR3
- GPR12
- MC4R
- MC5R
- MC3R
- MC2R
- MC1R
- GPR119

== See also ==
- Lysophospholipid receptor
