= Melanocortin receptor =

G protein-coupled receptor

Melanocortin receptors are members of the rhodopsin family of 7-transmembrane G protein-coupled receptors.

There are five known members of the melanocortin receptor system each with differing specificities for melanocortins:

- MC1R. MC1R is associated with pigmentation genetics.
- MC2R. MC2R is also known as the ACTH receptor or corticotropin receptor because it is specific for ACTH alone.
- MC3R. MC3R is associated with childhood growth, accrual of lean mass and onset of puberty.
- MC4R. Defects in MC4R are a cause of autosomal dominant obesity, accounting for 6% of all cases of early-onset obesity.
- MC5R. MC5R

These receptors are inhibited by endogenous inverse agonists agouti signalling peptide and agouti-related peptide, and activated by synthetic (i.e. afamelanotide) and endogenous agonist melanocyte-stimulating hormones.

== Selective ligands ==
Several selective ligands for the melanocortin receptors are known, and some synthetic compounds have been investigated as potential tanning, anti-obesity and aphrodisiac drugs, with tanning effects mainly from stimulation of MC_{1}, while anorectic and aphrodisiac effects appear to involve both MC_{3} and MC_{4}. MC_{1}, MC_{3} and MC_{4} are widely expressed in the brain, and are also thought to be responsible for effects on mood and cognition.

=== Agonists ===
Non-selective

- α-MSH
- β-MSH
- γ-MSH
- Afamelanotide
- Bremelanotide
- Melanotan II
- Modimelanotide
- Setmelanotide

MC_{1}-selective

- BMS-470,539

MC_{4}-selective

- PF-00446687
- PL-6983
- THIQ

Unknown (but for certain MC_{2}-acting)

- Alsactide
- Tetracosactide

=== Antagonists and inverse agonists ===
Non-selective

- Agouti-related peptide
- Agouti signalling peptide

MC_{2}-selective

- Atumelnant (CRN04894)

MC_{4}-selective

- HS-014
- HS-024
- MCL-0042
- MCL-0129
- MPB-10
- SHU-9119 (agonist at MC_{1} and MC_{5}, antagonist at MC_{3} and MC_{4})

=== Unknown ===
- Semax
