= Modimelanotide =

Chemical compound

Clinical data
- Other names: Acetylhexa-L-lysyl-α-MSH; AP-214; ABT-719; ZP-1480
- ATC code: None

Identifiers
- IUPAC name: N2-acetyl-L-lysyl-L-lysyl-L-lysyl-L-lysyl-L-lysyl-L-lysyl-L-seryl-L-tyrosyl-L-seryl-L-methionyl-L-alpha-glutamyl-L-histidyl-L-phenylalanyl-L-arginyl-L-tryptophylglycyl-L-lysyl-L-prolyl-L-valinamide
- CAS Number: 926277-68-1
- PubChem CID: 72941953
- ChemSpider: 34988374
- UNII: 96C1EBE9CG
- CompTox Dashboard (EPA): DTXSID001032325

Chemical and physical data
- Formula: C_{113}H_{181}N_{33}O_{25}S
- Molar mass: 2433.96 g·mol^{−1}
- 3D model (JSmol): Interactive image
- SMILES: [H]/N=C(\N)/NCCC[C@@H](C(=O)N[C@@H](Cc1c[nH]c2c1cccc2)C(=O)NCC(=O)N[C@@H](CCCCN)C(=O)N3CCC[C@H]3C(=O)N[C@@H](C(C)C)C(=O)N)NC(=O)[C@H](Cc4ccccc4)NC(=O)[C@H](Cc5c[nH]cn5)NC(=O)[C@H](CCC(=O)O)NC(=O)[C@H](CCSC)NC(=O)[C@H](CO)NC(=O)[C@H](Cc6ccc(cc6)O)NC(=O)[C@H](CO)NC(=O)[C@H](CCCCN)NC(=O)[C@H](CCCCN)NC(=O)[C@H](CCCCN)NC(=O)[C@H](CCCCN)NC(=O)[C@H](CCCCN)NC(=O)[C@H](CCCCN)NC(=O)C
- InChI: InChI=1S/C113H181N33O25S/c1-66(2)94(95(121)154)145-111(170)91-38-25-54-146(91)112(171)84(36-16-23-52-120)130-92(151)62-127-96(155)87(58-70-60-126-74-29-9-8-28-73(70)74)141-102(161)81(37-24-53-125-113(122)123)136-106(165)85(56-68-26-6-5-7-27-68)139-108(167)88(59-71-61-124-65-128-71)142-104(163)82(43-44-93(152)153)137-105(164)83(45-55-172-4)138-109(168)89(63-147)144-107(166)86(57-69-39-41-72(150)42-40-69)140-110(169)90(64-148)143-103(162)80(35-15-22-51-119)135-101(160)79(34-14-21-50-118)134-100(159)78(33-13-20-49-117)133-99(158)77(32-12-19-48-116)132-98(157)76(31-11-18-47-115)131-97(156)75(129-67(3)149)30-10-17-46-114/h5-9,26-29,39-42,60-61,65-66,75-91,94,126,147-148,150H,10-25,30-38,43-59,62-64,114-120H2,1-4H3,(H2,121,154)(H,124,128)(H,127,155)(H,129,149)(H,130,151)(H,131,156)(H,132,157)(H,133,158)(H,134,159)(H,135,160)(H,136,165)(H,137,164)(H,138,168)(H,139,167)(H,140,169)(H,141,161)(H,142,163)(H,143,162)(H,144,166)(H,145,170)(H,152,153)(H4,122,123,125)/t75-,76-,77-,78-,79-,80-,81-,82-,83-,84-,85-,86-,87-,88-,89-,90-,91-,94-/m0/s1; Key:WHRVKPBBRZHWTN-ZHHKRVSMSA-N

Modimelanotide (INN; development code AP-214, ABT-719, and ZP-1480) is a melanocortinergic peptide drug derived from α-melanocyte-stimulating hormone (α-MSH) which was under development by, at different times, Action Pharma, Abbott Laboratories, AbbVie, and Zealand for the treatment of acute kidney injury. It acts as a non-selective melanocortin receptor agonist, with IC_{50} values of 2.9 nM, 1.9 nM, 3.7 nM, and 110 nM at the MC_{1}, MC_{3}, MC_{4}, and MC_{5} receptors. Modimelanotide failed clinical trials for acute kidney injury despite showing efficacy in animal models, and development was not further pursued.

== See also ==
- Afamelanotide
- BMS-470,539
- Bremelanotide
- Melanotan II
- PF-00446687
- Setmelanotide
