= Melanocyte-stimulating hormone =

Family of peptide hormones and neuropeptides

pro-opiomelanocortin

Identifiers
- Symbol: POMC
- NCBI gene: 5443
- HGNC: 9201
- OMIM: 176830
- RefSeq: NM_000939
- UniProt: P01189

Other data
- Locus: Chr. 2 p23
Search for
- Structures: Swiss-model
- Domains: InterPro

Melanocyte-stimulating hormone

Identifiers
- CAS Number: 9002-79-3
- ChemSpider: none
- ChEMBL: ChEMBL214332

The melanocyte-stimulating hormones, known collectively as MSH, also known as melanotropins or intermedins, are a family of peptide hormones and neuropeptides consisting of α-melanocyte-stimulating hormone (α-MSH), β-melanocyte-stimulating hormone (β-MSH), and γ-melanocyte-stimulating hormone (γ-MSH) that are produced by cells in the pars intermedia of the anterior lobe of the pituitary gland.

Synthetic analogues of α-MSH, such as afamelanotide (melanotan I; Scenesse), melanotan II, and bremelanotide (PT-141), have been developed and researched.

== Biosynthesis ==
The various forms of MSH are generated from different cleavages of the proopiomelanocortin protein, which also yields other important neuropeptides like adrenocorticotropic hormone.

Melanocytes in skin make and secrete MSH in response to ultraviolet light, where it increases synthesis of melanin. Some neurons in arcuate nucleus of the hypothalamus make and secrete α-MSH in response to leptin; α-MSH is also made and secreted in the anterior lobe of the pituitary gland.

== Function ==
Acting through melanocortin 1 receptor, α-MSH stimulates the production and release of melanin (a process referred to as melanogenesis) by melanocytes in skin and hair.

Acting in the hypothalamus, α-MSH suppresses appetite. α-MSH secreted in the hypothalamus also contributes to sexual arousal.

=== In amphibians ===
In some animals (such as the claw-toed frog Xenopus laevis) production of MSH is increased when the animal is in a dark location. This causes pigment to be dispersed in pigment cells in the toad's skin, making it become darker, and harder for predators to spot. The pigment cells are called melanophores and therefore, in amphibians, the hormone is often called melanophore-stimulating hormone.

=== In humans ===
An increase in MSH will cause darker skin in humans too. Pigmentation increases in humans during pregnancy; though the exact endocrine cause is not known, α- and β-melanocyte-stimulating hormone are thought to be involved. Cushing's disease due to excess adrenocorticotropic hormone (ACTH) may also result in hyperpigmentation, such as acanthosis nigricans in the axilla. Most people with primary Addison's disease have darkening (hyperpigmentation) of the skin, including areas not exposed to the sun; characteristic sites are skin creases (e.g. of the hands), nipple, and the inside of the cheek (buccal mucosa), new scars become hyperpigmented, whereas older ones do not darken. This occurs because MSH and ACTH share the same precursor molecule, proopiomelanocortin (POMC).

Different levels of MSH are not the major cause of variation in skin colour. However, in many red-headed people, and other people who do not tan well, there are variations in their hormone receptors, causing them to not respond to MSH in the blood.

== Structure of MSH ==
proopiomelanocortin derivatives

POMC
γ-MSH	ACTH		β-lipotropin
	α-MSH	CLIP	γ-lipotropin	β-endorphin
			β-MSH

The different forms of MSH belong to a group called the melanocortins. This group includes ACTH, α-MSH, β-MSH, and γ-MSH; these peptides are all cleavage products of a large precursor peptide called proopiomelanocortin (POMC). α-MSH is the most important melanocortin for pigmentation.

The different forms of MSH have the following amino acid sequences:

α-MSH:	Ac-Ser-Tyr-Ser-Met-Glu-His-Phe-Arg-Trp-Gly-Lys-Pro-Val
β-MSH (human):	Ala-Glu-Lys-Lys-Asp-Glu-Gly-Pro-Tyr-Arg-Met-Glu-His-Phe-Arg-Trp-Gly-Ser-Pro-Pro-Lys-Asp
β-MSH (porcine):	Asp-Glu-Gly-Pro-Tyr-Lys-Met-Glu-His-Phe-Arg-Trp-Gly-Ser-Pro-Pro-Lys-Asp
γ-MSH:	Tyr-Val-Met-Gly-His-Phe-Arg-Trp-Asp-Arg-Phe-Gly

== Synthetic MSH ==
Synthetic analogues of α-MSH have been developed for human use. Two of the better known are afamelanotide (melanotan I) in testing by Clinuvel Pharmaceuticals and bremelanotide by Palatin Technologies. Others include modimelanotide and setmelanotide.

- Afamelanotide (brand name Scenesse) has been approved for the treatment of erythropoietic protoporphyria in Europe and is also being investigated as a method of photoprotection in the treatment of polymorphous light eruption, actinic keratosis and squamous cell carcinoma (a form of skin cancer).
- An additional analogue called melanotan II causes enhanced libido and erections in most male test subjects and arousal with corresponding genital involvement in most female test subjects. Bremelanotide (formerly PT-141) which stemmed from melanotan II research is currently under development for its aphrodisiac effects. These effects are mediated by actions in the hypothalamus on neurons that express MC_{3} and MC_{4} receptors.

== See also ==
- Melanocyte-inhibiting factor
- Agouti-related peptide
- Agouti signalling peptide
- Nelson's syndrome
