= BMS-470539 =

Chemical compound

Clinical data
- Routes of administration: S.C.
- ATC code: None

Legal status
- Legal status: In general: non-regulated

Pharmacokinetic data
- Bioavailability: 100% (with S.C. administration)
- Elimination half-life: 1.7 hours

Identifiers
- IUPAC name: (2S)-2-amino-N-[(1R)-2-(4-butanoyl-4-phenyl-1-piperidyl)-1-[(4-methoxyphenyl)methyl]-2-oxo-ethyl]-3-(3-methylimidazol-4-yl)propanamide dihydrochloride
- CAS Number: 457893-92-4
- ChemSpider: 26232155
- UNII: RSN3ADT27Y
- CompTox Dashboard (EPA): DTXSID60432747

Chemical and physical data
- Formula: C_{32}H_{41}N_{5}O_{4}
- Molar mass: 559.711 g·mol^{−1}
- 3D model (JSmol): Interactive image
- SMILES: CCCC(=O)C1(CCN(CC1)C(=O)[C@@H](Cc2ccc(cc2)OC)NC(=O)[C@H](Cc3cncn3C)N)c4ccccc4
- InChI: InChI=1S/C32H41N5O4.2ClH/c1-4-8-29(38)32(24-9-6-5-7-10-24)15-17-37(18-16-32)31(40)28(19-23-11-13-26(41-3)14-12-23)35-30(39)27(33)20-25-21-34-22-36(25)2;;/h5-7,9-14,21-22,27-28H,4,8,15-20,33H2,1-3H3,(H,35,39);2*1H/t27-,28+;;/m0../s1; Key:DUAOBJHRUKFKIH-YDVFRNEYSA-N

BMS-470539 is a small-molecule experimental drug which acts as a potent and highly selective full agonist of the MC_{1} receptor. It was discovered in 2003 as part of an effort to understand the role of the MC_{1} receptor in immunomodulation, and has since been used in scientific research to determine its role in inflammatory processes. The compound was designed with the intention of mimicking the central His-Phe-Arg-Trp pharmacophore of the melanocortins, and this proved to be successful based on its favorable pharmacodynamic profile.

== See also ==
- Afamelanotide
- Bremelanotide
- Melanotan II
- Modimelanotide
- Setmelanotide
