= THIQ =

Chemical compound

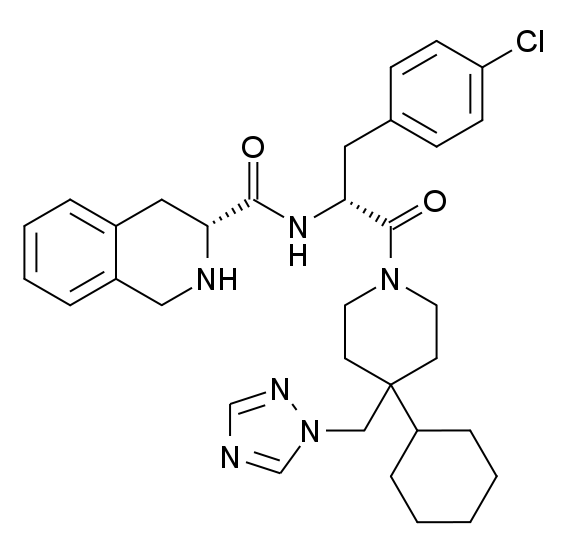

Identifiers
- IUPAC name: N-[(3R)-1,2,3,4-tetrahydroisoquinolinium-3-ylcarbonyl]-(1R)-1-(4-chlorobenzyl) -2-[4-cyclohexyl-4-(1H-1,2,4-triazol-1ylmethyl)piperidin-1-yl]-2-oxoethylamine
- CAS Number: 312637-48-2
- PubChem CID: 9938402
- IUPHAR/BPS: 1338
- ChemSpider: 8114027
- CompTox Dashboard (EPA): DTXSID00953320

Chemical and physical data
- Formula: C_{33}H_{41}ClN_{6}O_{2}
- Molar mass: 589.18 g·mol^{−1}
- 3D model (JSmol): Interactive image
- SMILES: C1CCC(CC1)C2(CCN(CC2)C(=O)[C@@H](CC3=CC=C(C=C3)Cl)NC(=O)[C@H]4CC5=CC=CC=C5CN4)CN6C=NC=N6
- InChI: InChI=1S/C33H41ClN6O2/c34-28-12-10-24(11-13-28)18-30(38-31(41)29-19-25-6-4-5-7-26(25)20-36-29)32(42)39-16-14-33(15-17-39,21-40-23-35-22-37-40)27-8-2-1-3-9-27/h4-7,10-13,22-23,27,29-30,36H,1-3,8-9,14-21H2,(H,38,41)/t29-,30-/m1/s1; Key:HLCHESOMJVGDSJ-LOYHVIPDSA-N

THIQ is a drug used in scientific research, which is the first non-peptide agonist developed that is selective for the melanocortin receptor subtype MC_{4}. In animal studies, THIQ stimulated sexual activity in rats, but with little effect on appetite or inflammation. This supports possible application of MC_{4} selective agonists for the treatment of sexual dysfunction in humans, although THIQ itself has poor oral bioavailability and a short duration of action so improved analogues will need to be developed.

== See also ==
- Bremelanotide
- Melanotan II
- PL-6983
- PF-00446687
