= Bivamelagon =

Chemical compound

Clinical data
- Other names: LB54640; LB-54640; LR-19021; LR19021
- Routes of administration: Oral
- Drug class: Melanocortin MC_{4} receptor agonist

Legal status
- Legal status: Investigational

Identifiers
- IUPAC name: N-[(3S,5S)-1-[(3S,4R)-1-tert-butyl-4-(4-chlorophenyl)pyrrolidine-3-carbonyl]-5-(morpholine-4-carbonyl)pyrrolidin-3-yl]-2-methyl-N-(4-methylcyclohexyl)propanamide
- CAS Number: 2641595-54-0
- PubChem CID: 165152355
- DrugBank: DB18331
- ChemSpider: 129440355
- UNII: NO1Y8WRA8N

Chemical and physical data
- Formula: C_{35}H_{53}ClN_{4}O_{4}
- Molar mass: 629.28 g·mol^{−1}
- 3D model (JSmol): Interactive image
- SMILES: CC1CCC(CC1)N([C@H]2C[C@H](N(C2)C(=O)[C@@H]3CN(C[C@H]3C4=CC=C(C=C4)Cl)C(C)(C)C)C(=O)N5CCOCC5)C(=O)C(C)C
- InChI: InChI=1S/C35H53ClN4O4/c1-23(2)32(41)40(27-13-7-24(3)8-14-27)28-19-31(34(43)37-15-17-44-18-16-37)39(20-28)33(42)30-22-38(35(4,5)6)21-29(30)25-9-11-26(36)12-10-25/h9-12,23-24,27-31H,7-8,13-22H2,1-6H3/t24?,27?,28-,29-,30+,31-/m0/s1; Key:QLOCFNAGHBVTJD-JBHFHXMJSA-N

Bivamelagon (INN; developmental code names LB54640, LR-19021) is a small-molecule melanocortin MC_{4} receptor agonist under development by LG Chem Life Sciences for the treatment of hypothalamic obesity, . Unlike the older drug with the same mechanism of action, setmelanotide, it can be taken orally. As of 9 Feb 2026, Rhythm Pharmaceuticals has completed phase 2 clinical trials.
