= Mifomelatide =

Clinical data
- Other names: TCMCB07; TCMCB-07
- Routes of administration: Subcutaneous injection
- Drug class: Melanocortin MC_{3} and MC_{4} receptor antagonist

Identifiers
- IUPAC name: (3S,11S,14S,17S,20R,23S)-3-[[(2S)-2-acetamidohexanoyl]amino]-N-[(2R)-1-[(2R)-2-carbamoylpyrrolidin-1-yl]-3-methyl-1-oxobutan-2-yl]-17-[3-(diaminomethylideneamino)propyl]-14-(1H-indol-3-ylmethyl)-20-(naphthalen-2-ylmethyl)-2,5,13,16,19,22-hexaoxo-1,6,12,15,18,21-hexazabicyclo[21.3.0]hexacosane-11-carboxamide
- CAS Number: 1456699-27-6
- PubChem CID: 171390017
- UNII: ZCH45RV64X

Chemical and physical data
- Formula: C_{63}H_{87}N_{15}O_{11}
- Molar mass: 1230.483 g·mol^{−1}
- 3D model (JSmol): Interactive image
- SMILES: CCCC[C@@H](C(=O)N[C@H]1CC(=O)NCCCC[C@H](NC(=O)[C@@H](NC(=O)[C@@H](NC(=O)[C@H](NC(=O)[C@@H]2CCCN2C1=O)CC3=CC4=CC=CC=C4C=C3)CCCN=C(N)N)CC5=CNC6=CC=CC=C65)C(=O)N[C@H](C(C)C)C(=O)N7CCC[C@@H]7C(=O)N)NC(=O)C
- InChI: InChI=1S/C63H87N15O11/c1-5-6-19-44(70-37(4)79)55(82)75-49-34-52(80)67-27-12-11-21-45(57(84)76-53(36(2)3)62(89)77-29-14-23-50(77)54(64)81)71-59(86)48(33-41-35-69-43-20-10-9-18-42(41)43)73-56(83)46(22-13-28-68-63(65)66)72-58(85)47(74-60(87)51-24-15-30-78(51)61(49)88)32-38-25-26-39-16-7-8-17-40(39)31-38/h7-10,16-18,20,25-26,31,35-36,44-51,53,69H,5-6,11-15,19,21-24,27-30,32-34H2,1-4H3,(H2,64,81)(H,67,80)(H,70,79)(H,71,86)(H,72,85)(H,73,83)(H,74,87)(H,75,82)(H,76,84)(H4,65,66,68)/t44-,45-,46-,47+,48-,49-,50+,51-,53+/m0/s1; Key:MBDALAXLRYJVAO-AXWWBJHISA-N

Mifomelatide (INN; developmental code name TCMCB07) is a melanocortin MC_{3} and MC_{4} receptor antagonist which is under development for the treatment of cachexia. It is a synthetic cyclic peptide and is taken by subcutaneous injection. Mifomelatide crosses the blood–brain barrier. The drug is being developed by Endevica Bio. As of February 2025, it is in phase 2 clinical trials.

== See also ==
- Atumelnant
