= C77H109N21O19S =

The molecular formula C_{77}H_{109}N_{21}O_{19}S (molar mass: 1664.884 g/mol) may refer to:

- Alpha-Melanocyte-stimulating hormone (α-MSH)
- Melanocyte-stimulating hormone (MSH)
