= PF-00446687 =

Experimental erectile dysfunction drug

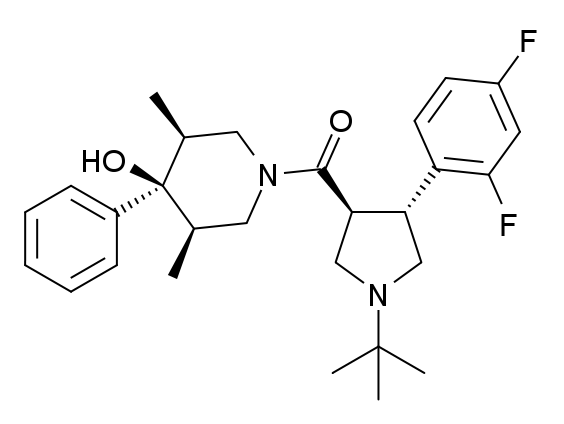

Clinical data
- Other names: PF-446687; PF446687; PF00446687; PF-446,687
- Drug class: Melanocortin MC_{4} receptor agonist

Identifiers
- IUPAC name: (3R,4R,5S)-1-([(3S,4R)-1-tert-butyl-4-(2,4-difluorophenyl)pyrrolidin-3-yl]carbonyl)-3,5-dimethyl-4-phenylpiperidin-4-ol
- CAS Number: 862281-92-3
- PubChem CID: 11328898
- ChemSpider: 24669573
- UNII: 63P236Z73I

Chemical and physical data
- Formula: C_{28}H_{36}F_{2}N_{2}O_{2}
- Molar mass: 470.605 g·mol^{−1}
- 3D model (JSmol): Interactive image
- SMILES: C[C@@H]1CN(C[C@@H]([C@]1(c2ccccc2)O)C)C(=O)[C@@H]3CN(C[C@H]3c4ccc(cc4F)F)C(C)(C)C
- InChI: InChI=1S/C28H36F2N2O2/c1-18-14-31(15-19(2)28(18,34)20-9-7-6-8-10-20)26(33)24-17-32(27(3,4)5)16-23(24)22-12-11-21(29)13-25(22)30/h6-13,18-19,23-24,34H,14-17H2,1-5H3/t18-,19+,23-,24+,28-/m0/s1; Key:WHPJOAUPIZDJNX-AGGGUQDCSA-N

PF-00446687, or PF-446687, is a drug developed by Pfizer for the treatment of erectile dysfunction, which is a non-peptide agonist selective for the melanocortin receptor subtype MC_{4}. It was found to be active in preliminary human trials, with the 200mg dose being of similar effectiveness to 100mg sildenafil, though lower doses were ineffective.

== Research ==
While it is unclear whether PF-00446687 itself will be potent and effective enough to be developed for medical use, it has demonstrated that selectively targeting the MC_{4} subtype can produce similar aphrodisiac effects to older non-selective peptide-based melanocortin receptor agonists like melanotan II and bremelanotide, without the side effects caused by action at the other melanocortin receptor subtypes.

== See also ==
- List of investigational sexual dysfunction drugs
- PL-6983
- PF-219,061
- UK-414,495
