= Sunless tanning =

Tanning without ultraviolet exposure

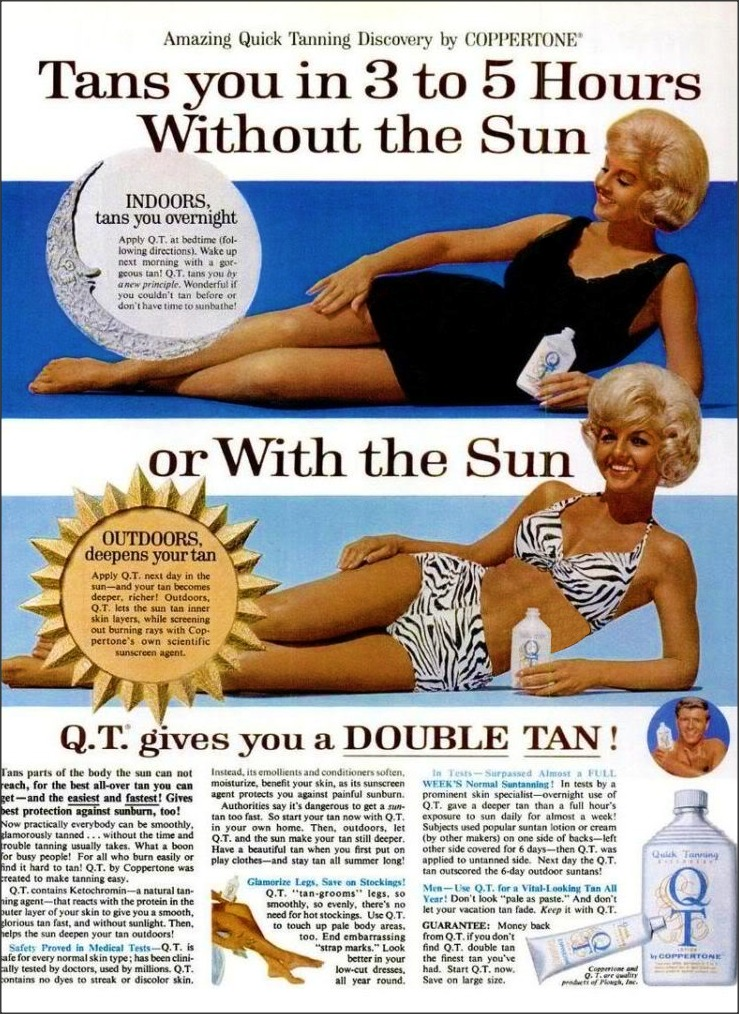
1960s advertisement for tanning lotion

Sunless tanning (Note: Also known as self tanning or fake tanning. Spray tanning and airbrush tanning are methods of topical application rather than distinct product types.) refers to the effect of a suntan without exposure to the Sun. Sunless tanning involves the use of oral agents (carotenids), or creams, lotions or sprays applied to the skin. Skin-applied products may be skin-reactive agents or temporary bronzers (colorants).

Sunless tanning has emerged as an alternative to UV exposure (from sunlight or indoor tanning), which has been linked to increased risk of skin cancer.

The chemical compound dihydroxyacetone (DHA) is used in sunless tanning products in concentrations of 3%-5%. DHA concentration is adjusted to provide darker and lighter shades of tan. The reaction of keratin protein present in skin and DHA is responsible for the production of pigmentation.

== History ==
The tanning effect of dihydroxyacetone (DHA) was discovered in the 1950s by Eva Wittgenstein at Cincinnati Children's Hospital, who observed that DHA used in an oral treatment stained the skin brown on contact. The first commercial DHA self-tanner, Man-Tan, appeared in 1959, followed by Coppertone's "QT" (Quick Tan) in 1960; both produced an orange-toned result that gave early self-tanners a poor reputation. Reformulated products and, from the late 1990s, automated spray-tan booths broadened the market.

== Oral agents (carotenoids) ==
A method of sunless tanning is consumption of certain carotenoids—antioxidants found in some fruits and vegetables such as carrots and tomatoes—which can result in changes to skin color when ingested chronically and/or in high amounts. Carotenoids are long-lasting. In addition, carotenoids have been linked to a more attractive skin tone (defined as a more golden skin color) than suntan. Carotenes also fulfil the function of melanin in absorbing UV radiation and protecting the skin. For example, they are concentrated in the macula of the eye to protect the retina from damage. They are used in plants both to protect chlorophyll from light damage and harvest light directly.

Carotenaemia (xanthaemia) is the presence in blood of the yellow pigment carotene from excessive intake of carrots or other vegetables containing the pigment resulting in increased serum carotenoids. It can lead to subsequent yellow-orange discoloration (xanthoderma or carotenoderma) and their subsequent deposition in the outermost layer of skin. Carotenemia, or carotenoderma, is in itself harmless, and does not require treatment. In primary carotenoderma, when the use of high quantities of carotene is discontinued the skin color will return to normal. It may take up to several months, however, for this to happen.

=== Lycopene ===
Lycopene is a key intermediate in the biosynthesis of beta-carotene and xanthophylls.

Lycopene may be the most powerful carotenoid quencher of singlet oxygen.

Due to its strong color and non-toxicity, lycopene is a useful food coloring (registered as E160d) and is approved for usage in the US, Australia and New Zealand (registered as 160d) and the EU.

=== Beta-carotene ===
Sunless-tanning pills often contain β-carotene. The American Cancer Society states that "Although the US Food and Drug Administration (FDA) has approved some of these additives for coloring food, they are not approved for use in tanning agents." Also that "They may be harmful at the high levels that are used in tanning pills."

Chronic, high doses of synthetic β-carotene supplements have been associated with increased rate of lung cancer among those who smoke.

=== Canthaxanthin ===
Canthaxanthin is most commonly used as a color additive in certain foods. Although the FDA has approved the use of canthaxanthin in food, it does not approve its use as a tanning agent and has issued warnings concerning its use. When used as a color additive, only very small amounts of canthaxanthin are needed. As a tanning agent, however, much larger quantities are used. After canthaxanthin is consumed, it is deposited throughout the body, including in the layer of fat below the skin, which turns an orange-brown color. These types of tanning pills have been linked to various side effects, including hepatitis and canthaxanthin retinopathy, a condition in which yellow deposits form in the retina of the eye. Other side effects including damage to the digestive system and skin surface have also been noted.

== Skin-reactive agents ==
=== DHA-based products ===
DHA (dihydroxyacetone, also known as glycerone) is not a dye, stain or paint, but causes a chemical reaction with the amino acids in the dead layer on the skin surface. One of the pathways is a free radical-mediated Maillard reaction. The other pathway is the conventional Maillard reaction, a process well known to food chemists that causes the browning that occurs during food manufacturing and storage. It does not involve the underlying skin pigmentation nor does it require exposure to ultraviolet light to initiate the color change. However, for the 24 hours after self-tanner is applied, the skin is especially susceptible to ultraviolet, according to a 2007 study led by Katinka Jung of the Gematria Test Lab in Berlin. Forty minutes after the researchers treated skin samples with high levels of DHA they found that more than 180 percent additional free radicals formed during sun exposure compared with untreated skin. Another self-tanner ingredient, erythrulose, produced a similar response at high levels. For a day after self-tanner application, excessive sun exposure should be avoided and sunscreen should be worn outdoors, they say; an antioxidant cream could also minimize free radical production. Although some self-tanners contain sunscreen, its effect will not last long after application, and a fake tan itself will not protect the skin from UV exposure. The study by Jung et al. further confirms earlier results demonstrating that dihydroxyacetone in combination with dimethylisosorbide enhances the process of (sun-based) tanning. This earlier study also found that dihydroxyacetone also has an effect on the amino acids and nucleic acids which is bad for the skin.

The free radicals are due to the action of UV light on AGE (advanced glycation end-products) as a result of the reaction of DHA with the skin, and the intermediates, such as Amadori products (a type of AGE), that lead to them. AGEs are behind the damage to the skin that occurs with high blood sugar in diabetes where similar glycation occurs. AGEs absorb and provide a little protection against some of the damaging factors of UV (up to SPF 3), However, they do not have melanin's extended electronic structure that dissipates the energy, so part of it goes towards starting free radical chain reactions instead, in which other AGEs participate readily. Overall tanner enhances free radical injury. Although some self-tanners contain sunscreen, its effect will not last as long as the tan. The stated SPF is only applicable for a few hours after application. Despite darkening of the skin, an individual is still susceptible to UV rays, therefore an overall sun protection is still very necessary. There may also be some inhibition of vitamin D production in DHA-treated skin.

The color effect is temporary and fades gradually over 3 to 10 days. Some of these products also use erythrulose which works identically to DHA, but develops more slowly. Both DHA and erythrulose have been known to cause contact dermatitis.

An opinion issued by the European Commission's Scientific Committee on Consumer Safety, concluding spray tanning with DHA did not pose risk, has been heavily criticized by specialists. This is because the cosmetics industry in Europe chose the evidence to review, according to the commission itself. Thus, nearly every report the commission's eventual opinion referenced came from studies that were never published or peer-reviewed and, in the majority of cases, were performed by companies or industry groups linked to the manufacturing of DHA. The industry left out nearly all of the peer-reviewed studies published in publicly available scientific journals that identified DHA as a potential mutagen. A study by scientists from the Department of Dermatology, Bispebjerg Hospital, published in Mutation Research has concluded DHA 'induces DNA damage, cell-cycle block and apoptosis' in cultured cells.

=== SIK-inhibitors ===
A novel class of compounds has been found to stimulate melanogenesis in a mechanism that is independent from α-melanocyte-stimulating hormone (α-MSH) activation of the melanocortin 1 receptor (MC_{1} receptor). This is accomplished via small molecule inhibition of salt-inducible kinases (SIK). Inhibition of SIK increases transcription of MITF which is known to increase melanin production. Work published in June 2017 has demonstrated compounds that have efficacy when applied topically to human skin. These compounds are still however in pre-clinical stages of development. Future directions may include the incorporation of SIK-inhibitor compounds with traditional UV-blocking sunscreens to minimize UV-related DNA damage in the short term while providing longer term protection through endogenous melanin production.

=== Tyrosine-based products ===
Tanning accelerators—lotions or pills that usually contain the amino acid tyrosine—claim that they stimulate and increase melanin formation, thereby accelerating the tanning process. These are used in conjunction with UV exposure. At this time, there is no scientific data available to support these claims.

=== Melanotan peptide hormones ===
The role of alpha-melanocyte-stimulating hormone (α-MSH) in promoting melanin diffusion has been known since the 1960s. In the 1980s, scientists at University of Arizona began attempting to develop α-MSH and analogs as potential sunless tanning agents, and synthesized and tested several analogs, including afamelanotide, then called melanotan-I.

In the European Union and United States, afamelanotide is indicated for the prevention of phototoxicity in adults with erythropoietic protoporphyria. Afamelanotide is also being investigated as a method of photoprotection from in the treatment of polymorphous light eruption, actinic keratosis and squamous cell carcinoma (a form of skin cancer). Bremelanotide is used for the treatment of generalized hypoactive sexual desire disorder (HSDD) in premenopausal women.

To pursue the tanning agent, melanotan-I was licensed by Competitive Technologies, a technology transfer company operating on behalf of University of Arizona, to an Australian startup called Epitan, which changed its name to Clinuvel in 2006.

A number of products are sold online and in gyms and beauty salons as "melanotan" or "melanotan-1" which discuss afamelanotide in their marketing. The products are not legal in any jurisdiction and are dangerous. Starting in 2007 health agencies in various counties began issuing warnings against their use.

=== Other melanogenesis stimulants ===
Eicosanoids, retinoids, oestrogens, melanocyte-stimulating hormone, endothelins, psoralens, hydantoin, forskolin, cholera toxin, isobutylmethylxanthine, diacylglycerol analogues, and UV irradiation all trigger melanogenesis and, in turn, pigmentation.

== Temporary bronzers (skin colorants) ==
Bronzers are a temporary sunless tanning or bronzing option. These come in powders, sprays, mousse, gels, lotions and moisturizers. Once applied, they create a tan that can easily be removed with soap and water. Like make-up, these products tint or stain a person's skin only until they are washed off.

They are often used for "one-day" only tans, or to complement a DHA-based sunless tan. Many formulations are available, and some have limited sweat or light water resistance. Walnut oil extract, jojoba extract, and caramel are ingredients frequently used in temporary bronzers. If bronzer is applied under clothing, or where fabric and skin edges meet, most will create some light but visible rub-off. Dark clothing prevents the rub-off from being noticeable. While these products are much safer than tanning beds, the color produced can sometimes look orangey and splotchy if applied incorrectly.

A recent trend is that of lotions or moisturizers containing a gradual tanning agent. A slight increase in color is usually observable after the first use, but color will continue to darken the more frequently the product is used.

Just as with the term "sunless tanner", the term "bronzer" is likewise not defined by law, or by regulations enforced by the FDA. What is defined and regulated is the color additive DHA, or dihydroxyacetone. (Note that the "color additive" dihydroxyacetone is itself colorless.)

Many of these bronzers contain allergens such as benzyl alcohol, tocopherol (vitamin E), and fragrances. While these bronzers are a safer alternative to tanning beds, consumers should be aware that allergic reactions on the skin may occur.

== Spray tanning ==
Spray tanning is a method of applying a dihydroxyacetone-based sunless tanning solution to the skin as a fine mist, producing a developed tan that lasts roughly five to ten days and fades as the outer skin layer is shed. Professional applications are offered at spas, salons and gymnasiums, either applied by hand with a hand-held airbrush sprayer ("airbrush tanning") or dispensed automatically in an enclosed spray booth that resembles a shower stall; consumer spray and aerosol products for home use are also widely sold.

The U.S. Food and Drug Administration has approved DHA for external application but not for use around the eyes, on the lips or on mucous membranes, and it has not approved DHA for inhalation. The agency notes that when DHA is applied as an all-over spray or mist in a commercial booth, it may be difficult to avoid exposure in these unapproved ways. DHA and the slower-developing co-ingredient erythrulose have both been reported to cause contact dermatitis.

== Risks ==
Tanners usually contain a sunscreen. However, when avobenzone is irradiated with UVA light, it generates a triplet excited state in the keto form which can either cause the avobenzone to degrade or transfer energy to biological targets and cause deleterious effects. It has been shown to degrade significantly in light, resulting in less protection over time. The UV-A light in a day of sunlight in a temperate climate is sufficient to break down most of the compound. It's important to continue wearing SPF while self-tanning, as self-tanner is generally a fake and temporary tan, and your skin is still sensitive to the sun.

If avobenzone-containing sunscreen is applied on top of tanner, the photosensitizer effect magnifies the free-radical damage promoted by DHA, as DHA may make the skin especially susceptible to free-radical damage from sunlight, according to a 2007 study led by Katinka Jung of the Gematria Test Lab in Berlin. Forty minutes after the researchers treated skin samples with 20% DHA they found that more than 180 percent additional free radicals formed during sun exposure compared with untreated skin.

A toxicologist and lung specialist at the University of Pennsylvania's Perelman School of Medicine (Dr. Rey Panettieri) has commented, "The reason I'm concerned is the deposition of the tanning agents into the lungs could really facilitate or aid systemic absorption -- that is, getting into the bloodstream. These compounds in some cells could actually promote the development of cancers or malignancies, and if that's the case then we need to be wary of them." A study by scientists from the Department of Dermatology, Bispebjerg Hospital, published in Mutation Research has concluded DHA 'induces DNA damage, cell-cycle block and apoptosis' in cultured cells.

Many self tanners use chemical fragrances which may cause skin allergies or may trigger asthma. Furthermore, some of them contain parabens. Parabens are preservatives that can affect the endocrine system.

== See also ==
- Indoor tanning
- Indoor tanning lotion
- Sun tanning
