= Hypothalamic obesity =

Medical condition

Hypothalamic obesity (abbreviated HO or HyOb) is a rare condition that can be congenital or acquired. Congenital causes include Prader-Willi syndrome and mutations of LEP (leptin gene), LEPR, POMC, MC4R, and CART. It can also result from injuries to the hypothalamus either from trauma, therapeutic radiation, brain surgery, and especially craniopharyngioma and its treatments. Possible treatments include bariatric surgery and melanocortin 4 receptor agonists such as setmelanotide.
