= Nelson's syndrome =

- Specialty: Endocrinology

Nelson's syndrome is a disorder that occurs in about one in four patients who have had both adrenal glands removed to treat Cushing's disease. In patients with pre-existing adrenocorticotropic hormone (ACTH)-secreting pituitary adenomas, loss of adrenal feedback following bilateral adrenalectomy can trigger the rapid growth of the tumor, leading to visual symptoms (e.g. bitemporal hemianopsia) and hyperpigmentation. The severity of the disease is dependent upon the effect of ACTH release on the skin, pituitary hormone loss from mass compression, as well as invasion into surrounding structures around the pituitary gland.

The first case of Nelson's syndrome was reported in 1958 by Dr. Don Nelson. Within the past ten to twenty years, improvements have been made identification and care for patients with Cushing's disease. Techniques such as pituitary radiation therapy, ACTH assay, transsphenoidal pituitary surgery, higher resolution MRIs, and sampling of the inferior petrosal sinus have allowed physicians to pursue routes for Cushing's syndrome therapy prior to consideration of bilateral adrenalectomy.

Nelson's syndrome is also referred to as post-adrenalectomy syndrome, a possible result of adrenalectomy performed for Cushing's disease.

== Symptoms and signs ==
The common symptoms include:

- hyper-pigmentation of the skin
- visual disturbances
- headaches
- abnormally high levels of beta-MSH and ACTH
- abnormal enlargements of the pituitary gland,
- interruption of menstrual cycles in women

== Cause ==
Common causes include bilateral adrenalectomy for the treatment of Cushing's disease and hypopituitarism. The onset of the disease can occur up to 24 years after bilateral adrenalectomy has been performed, with an average of up to 15 years after. A preventative measure that can be utilized is prophylactic radiotherapy when bilateral adrenalectomy is being performed to prevent Nelson's syndrome from manifesting. Screening can also be done with the help of an MRI in order to visualize the pituitary for tumors. If tumors are not present then an MRI should be performed at intervals. Hyper-pigmentation and fasting ACTH levels within plasma above 154 pmol/L are predictive of Nelson's syndrome after an adrenalectomy. Risk factors include being younger in age and pregnancy.

== Mechanism ==
After a bilateral adrenalectomy is performed cortisol levels are no longer normal. This increases CRH production because it is not suppressed within the hypothalamus anymore. The increased CRH levels promote the growth of the tumor. Mutations with genes and with the glucocorticoid receptor can affect the tumor as well. Furthermore, differences between Nelson syndrome and Cushing's disease have been studied. Particularly Nelson's syndrome differs from Cushing's disease due to the following: secretions from the tumors, replacement of glucocorticoids, and injury to the hypothalamus due to radiation therapy utilized on the patient. The pathophysiology of Nelson's syndrome is not understood very well. Corticotrophinomas are generated from corticotroph cells. Expression of functional CRH and vasopressin V3 receptors increase in number. Additionally, there are two isoforms of glucocorticoid receptors. Heterozygosity loss in the glucocorticoid receptor can occur in the tumors present in Nelson's syndrome. Overall, not all patients that have had total bilateral adrenalectomy develop Nelson's syndrome, which makes the mechanism harder to understand for such a rare disease. It is not clear whether the adrenalectomy or reduced cortisol secretion causes aggressive tumor growth.

== Diagnosis ==
Common diagnostic techniques include:

- MRIs
- CAT scans
- blood samples.

Blood samples are assessed for the absence or presence of aldosterone and cortisol. Physical examinations are also useful in patients to examine vision, skin pigmentation, how the body replaces steroids, and the cranial nerves. Recent advancements in high-resolution MRIs allow for adenomas to be detected during the early stages of Nelson syndrome. Physical examination including height, weight, vital signs, blood pressure, eye examination, thyroid examination, abdominal examination, neurological examination, skin examination, and pubertal staging needs to be assessed. Through blood pressure and pulse readings can indicate hypothyroidism and adrenal insufficiency. Hyper-pigmentation, hyporeflexia, and loss of vision can also indicate Nelson's syndrome when assessed together. Specifically for a child who might have Nelson's syndrome, the patient should be questioned about the symptoms of the disease, as well as symptoms of other diseases to narrow down which disease the patient presents with. The patient should be questioned about how often and to what degree headaches, visual disturbances, and symptoms associated with pituitary malfunction occur. Additionally, adrenal steroid replacement should be assessed.

== Treatment ==
Common treatments for Nelson's syndrome include radiation or surgical procedure. Radiation allows for the limitation of the growth of the pituitary gland and the adenomas. If the adenomas start to affect the surrounding structures of the brain, then a micro-surgical technique can be adapted to remove the adenomas in a transsphenoidal (bone at the base of the skull) process. Death may result in development of a locally aggressive pituitary tumor. However, does not commonly occur with pituitary diseases. In the rare case, ACTH-secreting tumors can become malignant. Morbidity from the disease can occur due to pituitary tissue compression or replacement, and compression of structures that surround the pituitary fossa. The tumor can also compress the optic apparatus, disturb cerebrospinal fluid flow, meningitis, and testicular enlargement in rare cases.

== Research ==
Through multiple advancements within the medical field, caregivers have been able to stray away from utilizing bilateral adrenalectomy as the treatment for Cushing's disease. This has decreased the risk of patients presenting with Nelson's syndrome. Alternative treatments for Nelson's syndrome have been discovered. The most utilized technique for Nelson's syndrome has been transsphenoidal surgery. In addition, pharmacotherapy, radiotherapy, and radiosurgery have been utilized accompanying a surgical procedure. Pharmacological drugs can also be given accompanying a transsphenoidal surgery including the following: pasireotide, temozolomide and octreotide. Within rats/mice, rosiglitazone has been an effective measure, however this has not been discovered in humans yet.
