= Agouti-signaling protein =

Protein-coding gene in mammals

ASIP

Identifiers
- Aliases: ASIP, AGSW, SHEP9, ASP, AGTIL, AGTI, agouti signaling protein
- External IDs: OMIM: 600201; MGI: 87853; GeneCards: ASIP
Available structures
PDB	Ortholog search: PDBe RCSB
PDB	List of PDB id codes 1Y7J, 1Y7K, 2KZA, 2L1J

Gene location (Human)
Chr.	Chromosome 20 (human)
Band	20q11.22	Start	34,194,569 bp
Band	20q11.22	End	34,269,344 bp

Gene location (Mouse)
Chr.	Chromosome 2 (mouse)
Band	2 H1|2 76.83 cM	Start	154,633,322 bp
Band	2 H1|2 76.83 cM	End	154,892,932 bp
RNA expression pattern
Bgee	Human / Mouse (ortholog); Top expressed in: apex of heart; left ovary; right ovary; left ventricle; testicle; skin of leg; skin of abdomen; corpus epididymis; tibial nerve; canal of the cervix / Top expressed in: spermatocyte; embryo; embryo; morula; hair bulb; blastocyst; spermatid; lip; thymus; central gray substance of midbrain; More reference expression data
BioGPS	n/a
Gene ontology
Molecular function	melanocortin receptor binding; signaling receptor binding; type 3 melanocortin receptor binding; type 4 melanocortin receptor binding
Cellular component	extracellular region; extracellular space; intracellular anatomical structure
Biological process	positive regulation of melanin biosynthetic process; pigmentation; cell-cell signaling; melanosome organization; melanin biosynthetic process; adult feeding behavior; genomic imprinting; melanosome transport; generation of precursor metabolites and energy; signal transduction; hormone-mediated signaling pathway
Sources:Amigo / QuickGO
Orthologs
Databases	NCBI: entry; OMA: entry
Species	Human	Mouse
Entrez	434	50518
Ensembl	ENSG00000101440	ENSMUSG00000027596
UniProt	P42127	Q03288
RefSeq (mRNA)	NM_001672; NM_001385218	NM_015770
RefSeq (protein)	NP_001663	NP_056585
Location (UCSC)	Chr 20: 34.19 – 34.27 Mb	Chr 2: 154.63 – 154.89 Mb
PubMed search
- Wikidata
View/Edit Human	View/Edit Mouse

Agouti-signaling protein is a protein that in humans is encoded by the ASIP gene. It is responsible for the distribution of melanin pigment in mammals. Agouti interacts with the melanocortin 1 receptor to determine whether the melanocyte (pigment cell) produces phaeomelanin (a red to yellow pigment), or eumelanin (a brown to black pigment). This interaction is responsible for making distinct light and dark bands in the hairs of animals such as the agouti, which the gene is named after. In other species such as horses, agouti signalling is responsible for determining which parts of the body will be red or black. Mice with wildtype agouti will be grey-brown, with each hair being partly yellow and partly black. Loss of function mutations in mice and other species cause black fur coloration, while mutations causing expression throughout the whole body in mice cause yellow fur and obesity.

The agouti-signaling protein (ASIP) is a competitive antagonist with alpha-Melanocyte-stimulating hormone (α-MSH) to bind with melanocortin 1 receptor (MC1R) proteins. Activation by α-MSH causes production of the darker eumelanin, while activation by ASIP causes production of the redder phaeomelanin. This means where and while agouti is being expressed, the part of the hair that is growing will come out yellow rather than black.

== Function ==
In mice, the agouti gene encodes a paracrine signalling molecule that causes hair follicle melanocytes to synthesize the yellow pigment pheomelanin instead of the black or brown pigment eumelanin. Pleiotropic effects of constitutive expression of the mouse gene include adult-onset obesity, increased tumor susceptibility, and premature infertility. This gene is highly similar to the mouse gene and encodes a secreted protein that may (1) affect the quality of hair pigmentation, (2) act as an inverse agonist of alpha-melanocyte-stimulating hormone, (3) play a role in neuroendocrine aspects of melanocortin action, and (4) have a functional role in regulating lipid metabolism in adipocytes.

In mice, the wild type agouti allele (A) presents a grey phenotype, however, many allele variants have been identified through genetic analyses, which result in a wide range of phenotypes distinct from the typical grey coat. The most widely studied allele variants are the lethal yellow mutation (A^{y}) and the viable yellow mutation (A^{vy}) which are caused by ectopic expression of agouti. These mutations are also associated with yellow obese syndrome which is characterized by early onset obesity, hyperinsulinemia and tumorigenesis. The murine agouti gene locus is found on chromosome 2 and encodes a 131 amino acid protein. This protein signals the distribution of melanin pigments in epithelial melanocytes located at the base of hair follicles with expression being more sensitive on ventral hair than on dorsal hair. Agouti is not directly secreted in the melanocyte as it works as a paracrine factor on dermal papillae cells to inhibit release of melanocortin. Melanocortin acts on follicular melanocytes to increase production of eumelanin, a melanin pigment responsible for brown and black hair. When agouti is expressed, production of pheomelanin dominates, a melanin pigment that produces yellow or red colored hair.

== Structure ==
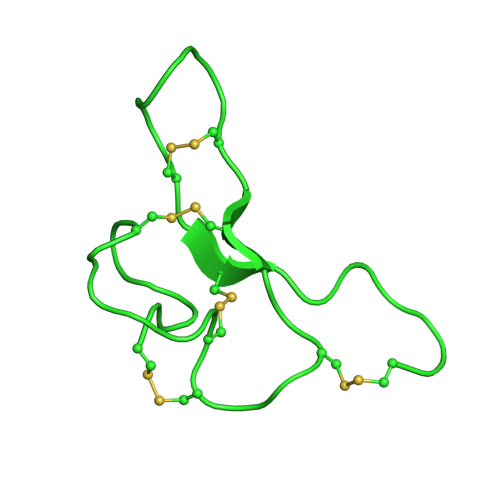
NMR structure family of Agouti Signalling Protein, C-terminal knotting domain. PDB entry 1y7k

Agouti signalling peptide adopts an inhibitor cystine knot motif. Along with the homologous Agouti-related peptide, these are the only known mammalian proteins to adopt this fold. The peptide consists of 131 amino acids.

== Mutations ==
The lethal yellow mutation (A^{y}) was the first embryonic mutation to be characterized in mice, as homozygous lethal yellow mice (A^{y}/ A^{y}) die early in development, due to an error in trophectoderm differentiation. Lethal yellow homozygotes are rare today, while lethal yellow and viable yellow heterozygotes (A^{y}/a and A^{vy}/a) remain more common. In wild-type mice agouti is only expressed in the skin during hair growth, but these dominant yellow mutations cause it to be expressed in other tissues as well. This ectopic expression of the agouti gene is associated with the yellow obese syndrome, characterized by early onset obesity, hyperinsulinemia and tumorigenesis.

The lethal yellow (A^{y}) mutation is due to an upstream deletion at the start site of agouti transcription. This deletion causes the genomic sequence of agouti to be lost, except the promoter and the first non-encoding exon of Raly, a ubiquitously expressed gene in mammals. The coding exons of agouti are placed under the control of the Raly promoter, initiating ubiquitous expression of agouti, increasing production of pheomelanin over eumelanin and resulting in the development of a yellow phenotype.

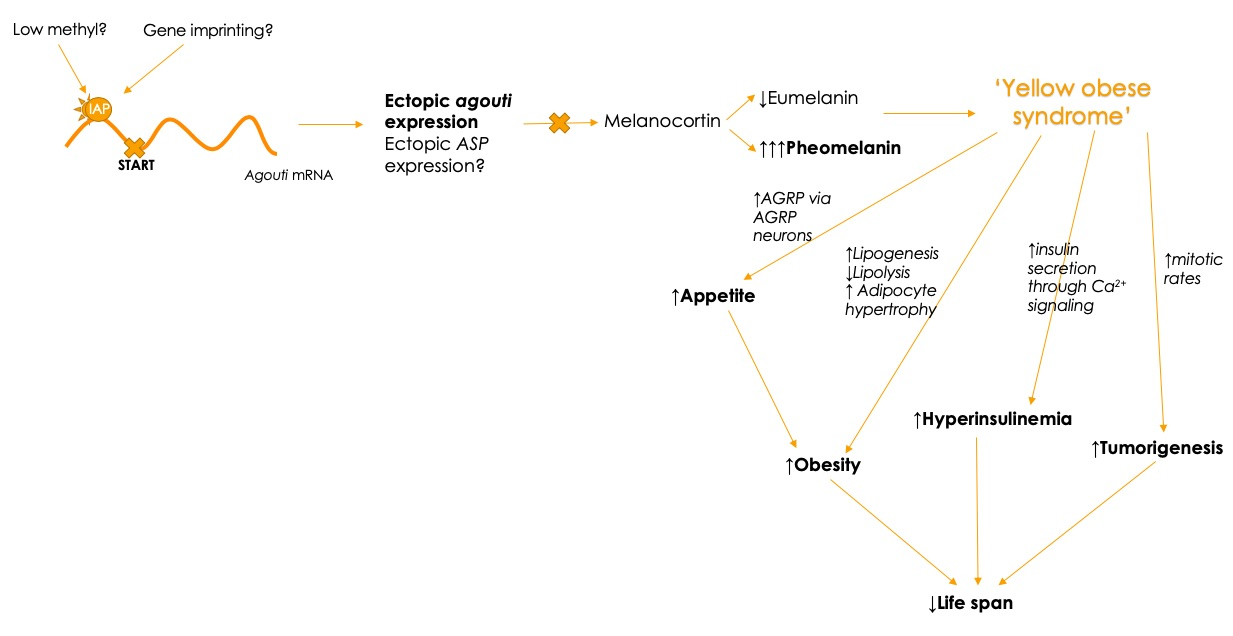
Proposed mechanism for the relationship between ectopic agouti expression and the development of yellow obese syndrome

The viable yellow (A^{vy}) mutation is due to a change in the mRNA length of agouti, as the expressed gene becomes longer than the normal gene length of agouti. This is caused by the insertion of a single intracisternal A particle (IAP) retrotransposon upstream to the start site of agouti transcription. In the proximal end of the gene, an unknown promoter then causes agouti to be constitutionally activated, and individuals to present with phenotypes consistent with the lethal yellow mutation. Although the mechanism for the activation of the promoter controlling the viable yellow mutation is unknown, the strength of coat color has been correlated with the degree of gene methylation, which is determined by maternal diet and environmental exposure. As agouti itself inhibits melanocortin receptors responsible for eumelanin production, the yellow phenotype is exacerbated in both lethal yellow and viable yellow mutations as agouti gene expression is increased.

Viable yellow (A^{vy}/a) and lethal yellow (A^{y}/a) heterozygotes have shortened life spans and increased risks for developing early onset obesity, type II diabetes mellitus and various tumors. The increased risk of developing obesity is due to the dysregulation of appetite, as agouti agonizes the agouti-related protein (AGRP), responsible for the stimulation of appetite via hypothalamic NPY/AGRP orexigenic neurons. Agouti also promotes obesity by antagonizing melanocyte-stimulating hormone (MSH) at the melanocortin receptor (MC4R), as MC4R is responsible for regulating food intake by inhibiting appetite signals. The increase in appetite is coupled to alterations in nutrient metabolism due to the paracrine actions of agouti on adipose tissue, increasing levels of hepatic lipogenesis, decreasing levels of lipolysis and increasing adipocyte hypertrophy. This increases body mass and leads to difficulties with weight loss as metabolic pathways become dysregulated. Hyperinsulinemia is caused by mutations to agouti, as the agouti protein functions in a calcium dependent manner to increase insulin secretion in pancreatic beta cells, increasing risks of insulin resistance. Increased tumor formation is due to the increased mitotic rates of agouti, which are localized to epithelial and mesenchymal tissues.

== Methylation and diet intervention ==
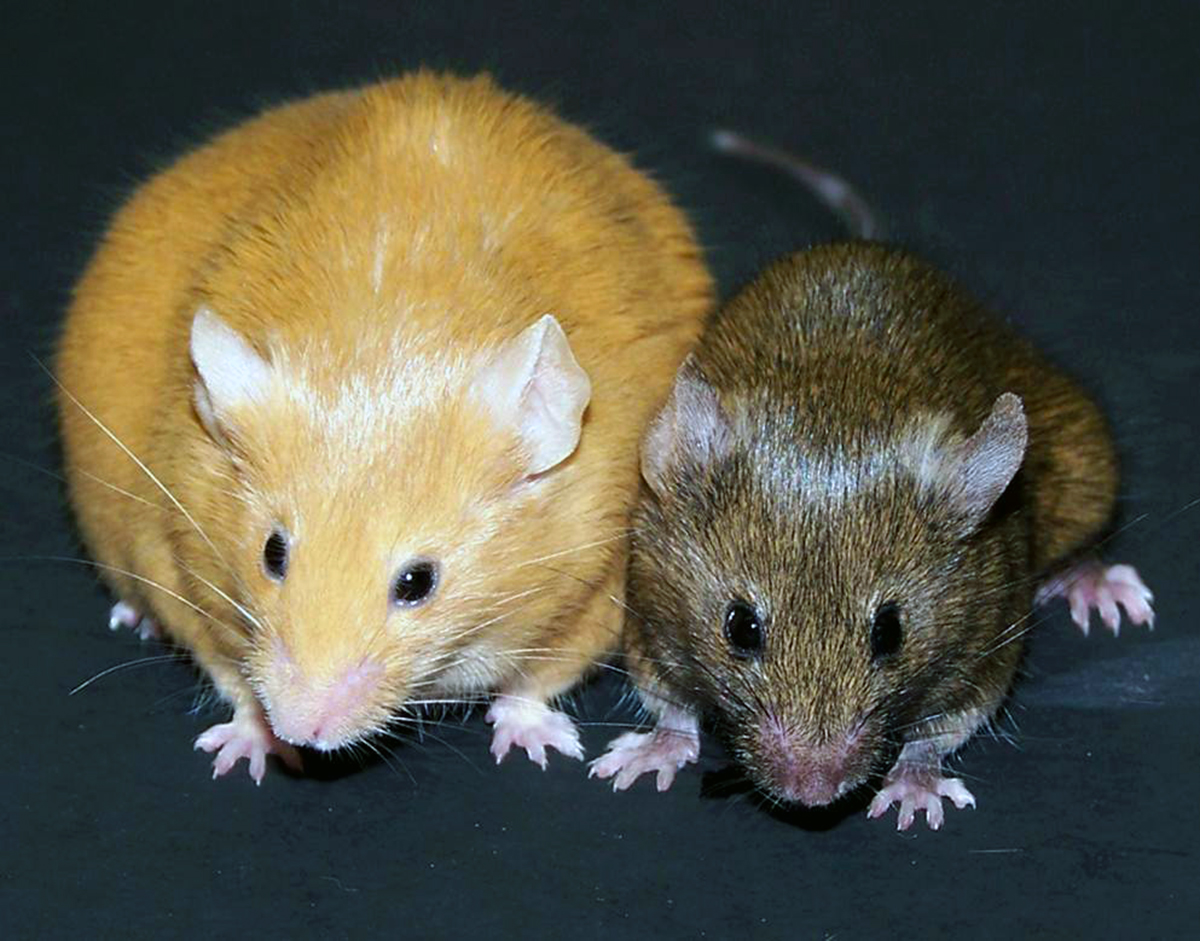
These mice are genetically identical despite looking phenotypically different. The mouse on the left's mother was fed Bisphenol A (BPA) with a normal mouse diet and the mouse on the right's mother was fed BPA with a methyl-rich diet. The left mouse is yellow and obese, while the right mouse is brown and healthy.

Correct functioning of agouti requires DNA methylation. Methylation occurs in six guanine-cytosine (GC) rich sequences in the 5’ long terminal repeat of the IAP element in the viable yellow mutation. Methylation on a gene causes the gene to not be expressed because it will cause the promoter to be turned off. In utero, the mother's diet can cause methylation or demethylation. When this area is unmethylated, ectopic expression of agouti occurs, and yellow phenotypes are shown because the phaeomelanin is expressed instead of eumelanin. When the region is methylated, agouti is expressed normally, and grey and brown phenotypes (eumelanin) occur. The epigenetic state of the IAP element is determined by the level of methylation, as individuals show a wide range of phenotypes based on their degree of DNA methylation. Increased methylation is correlated with increased expression of the normal agouti gene. Low levels of methylation can induce gene imprinting which results in offspring displaying consistent phenotypes to their parents, as ectopic expression of agouti is inherited through non-genomic mechanisms.

DNA methylation is determined in utero by maternal nutrition and environmental exposure. Methyl is synthesized de novo but attained through the diet by folic acid, methionine, betaine, and choline, as these nutrients feed into a consistent metabolic pathway for methyl synthesis. Adequate zinc and vitamin B12 are required for methyl synthesis as they act as cofactors for transferring methyl groups.

When inadequate methyl is available during early embryonic development, DNA methylation cannot occur, which increases ectopic expression of agouti and results in the presentation of the lethal yellow and viable yellow phenotypes which persist into adulthood. This leads to the development of the yellow obese syndrome, which impairs normal development and increases susceptibility to the development of chronic disease. Ensuring maternal diets are high in methyl equivalents is a key preventive measure for reducing ectopic expression of agouti in offspring. Diet intervention through methyl supplementation reduces imprinting at the agouti locus, as increased methyl consumption causes the IAP element to become completely methylated and ectopic expression of agouti to be reduced. This lowers the proportion of offspring that present with the yellow phenotype and increases the number offspring that resemble agouti wild type mice with grey coats. Two genetically identical mice could look very different phenotypically due to the mothers' diets while the mice were in utero. If the mice has the agouti gene it can be expressed due to the mother eating a typical diet and the offspring would have a yellow coat. If the same mother had eaten a methyl-rich diet supplemented with zinc, vitamin B12, and folic acid then the offspring's agouti gene would likely become methylated, it wouldn't be expressed, and the coat color would be brown instead. In mice, the yellow coat color is also associated with health problems in mice including obesity and diabetes.

== Human homologue ==
Agouti signaling protein (ASP) is the human homologue of murine agouti. It is encoded by the human agouti gene on chromosome 20 and is a protein consisting of 132 amino acids. It is expressed much more broadly than murine agouti and is found in adipose tissue, pancreas, testes, and ovaries, whereas murine agouti is solely expressed in melanocytes. ASP has 85% similarity to the murine form of agouti. As ectopic expression of murine agouti leads to the development of the yellow obese syndrome, this is expected to be consistent in humans. The yellow obese syndrome increases the development of many chronic diseases, including obesity, type II diabetes mellitus and tumorigenesis.

ASP has similar pharmacological activation to murine agouti, as melanocortin receptors are inhibited through competitive antagonism. Inhibition of melanocortin by ASP can also be through non-competitive methods, broadening its range of effects. The function of ASP differs to murine agouti. ASP effects the quality of hair pigmentation whereas murine agouti controls the distribution of pigments that determine coat color. ASP has neuroendocrine functions consistent with murine agouti, as it agonizes via AgRP neurons in the hypothalamus and antagonizes MSH at MC4Rs which reduce satiety signals. AgRP acts as an appetite stimulator and increases appetite while decreasing metabolism. Because of these mechanisms, AgRP may be linked to increased body mass and obesity in both humans and mice. Over-expression of AgRP has been linked to obesity in males, while certain polymorphisms of AgRP have been linked to eating disorders like anorexia nervosa. The mechanism underlying hyperinsulinemia in humans is consistent with murine agouti, as insulin secretion is heightened through calcium sensitive signaling in pancreatic beta cells. The mechanism for ASP induced tumorigenesis remains unknown in humans.

== See also ==
- Agouti coloration genetics
- Agouti-related peptide
- Genomic imprinting
- Methylation
- Epigenetics
