= Agouti-related peptide =

Mammalian protein found in Homo sapiens

AGRP
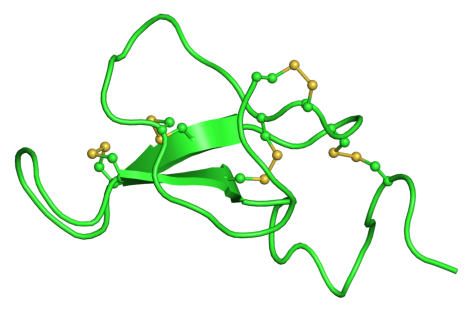

Identifiers
- Aliases: AGRP, agouti related neuropeptide, AGRT, ART, ASIP2, AgRP
- External IDs: OMIM: 602311; MGI: 892013; GeneCards: AGRP
Available structures
PDB	Ortholog search: PDBe RCSB
PDB	List of PDB id codes 1HYK, 1MR0

Gene location (Human)
Chr.	Chromosome 16 (human)
Band	16q22.1	Start	67,482,571 bp
Band	16q22.1	End	67,483,547 bp

Gene location (Mouse)
Chr.	Chromosome 8 (mouse)
Band	8|8 D3	Start	106,293,330 bp
Band	8|8 D3	End	106,364,025 bp
RNA expression pattern
Bgee	Human / Mouse (ortholog); Top expressed in: left adrenal gland; left adrenal cortex; right adrenal gland; right adrenal cortex; corpus epididymis; tail of epididymis; right lung; caput epididymis; upper lobe of left lung; monocyte / Top expressed in: median eminence; arcuate nucleus; blastocyst; neural layer of retina; morula; embryo; spermatocyte; embryo; choroid plexus of fourth ventricle; perirhinal cortex; More reference expression data
BioGPS	n/a
Gene ontology
Molecular function	neuropeptide hormone activity; signaling receptor binding
Cellular component	Golgi lumen; extracellular region; soma; Golgi apparatus; extracellular space
Biological process	response to insulin; adult feeding behavior; neuropeptide signaling pathway; regulation of feeding behavior; positive regulation of feeding behavior; circadian rhythm; feeding behavior; eating behavior; maternal process involved in female pregnancy; hormone-mediated signaling pathway; long-day photoperiodism; regulation of signaling receptor activity
Sources:Amigo / QuickGO
Orthologs
Databases	NCBI: entry; OMA: entry
Species	Human	Mouse
Entrez	181	11604
Ensembl	ENSG00000159723	ENSMUSG00000005705
UniProt	O00253	P56473
RefSeq (mRNA)	NM_001138	NM_001271806; NM_007427
RefSeq (protein)	NP_001129	NP_001258735; NP_031453
Location (UCSC)	Chr 16: 67.48 – 67.48 Mb	Chr 8: 106.29 – 106.36 Mb
PubMed search
- Wikidata
View/Edit Human	View/Edit Mouse

Agouti-related protein (AgRP), also called agouti-related peptide, is a neuropeptide produced in the brain by the AgRP/NPY neuron. It is synthesized in neuropeptide Y (NPY)-containing cell bodies located in the ventromedial part of the arcuate nucleus in the hypothalamus. AgRP is co-expressed with NPY and acts to increase appetite and decrease metabolism and energy expenditure. It is one of the most potent and long-lasting of appetite stimulators. In humans, the agouti-related peptide is encoded by the AGRP gene.

== Structure ==
AgRP is a paracrine signaling molecule made of 112 amino acids (the gene product of 132 amino acids is processed by removal of the N-terminal 20-residue signal peptide domain). It was independently identified by two teams in 1997 based on its sequence similarity with agouti signalling peptide (ASIP), a protein synthesized in the skin controlling coat colour. AgRP is approximately 25% identical to ASIP. The murine homologue of AgRP consists of 111 amino acids (precursor is 131 amino acids) and shares 81% amino acid identity with the human protein. Biochemical studies indicate AgRP to be very stable to thermal denaturation and acid degradation. Its secondary structure consists mainly of random coils and β-sheets that fold into an inhibitor cystine knot motif. AGRP maps to human chromosome 16q22 and Agrp to mouse chromosome 8D1-D2.

== Function ==
Agouti-related protein is expressed primarily in the adrenal gland, subthalamic nucleus, and hypothalamus, with lower levels of expression in the testis, kidneys, and lungs. The appetite-stimulating effects of AgRP are inhibited by the hormone leptin and activated by the hormone ghrelin. Adipocytes secrete leptin in response to food intake. This hormone acts in the arcuate nucleus and inhibits the AgRP/NPY neuron from releasing orexigenic peptides. Ghrelin has receptors on NPY/AgRP neurons that stimulate the secretion of NPY and AgRP to increase appetite. AgRP is stored in intracellular secretory granules and is secreted via a regulated pathway. The transcriptional and secretory action of AgRP is regulated by inflammatory signals. Levels of AgRP are increased during periods of fasting. It has been found that AgRP stimulates the hypothalamic-pituitary-adrenocortical axis to release ACTH, cortisol and prolactin. It also enhances the ACTH response to IL-1-beta, suggesting it may play a role in the modulation of neuroendocrine response to inflammation. Conversely, AgRP-secreting neurons inhibit the release of TRH from the paraventricular nucleus (PVN), which may contribute to conservation of energy in starvation. This pathway is part of a feedback loop, since TRH-secreting neurons from PVN stimulate AgRP neurons.

== Mechanism ==
AGRP has been demonstrated to be a competitive antagonist of melanocortin receptors, specifically MC3-R and MC4-R. The melanocortin receptors, MC3-R and MC4-R, are directly linked to metabolism and body weight control. These receptors are activated by the peptide hormone α-MSH (melanocyte-stimulating hormone) and antagonized by the agouti-related protein. Whereas α-MSH acts broadly on most members of the MCR family (with the exception of MC2-R), AGRP is highly specific for only MC3-R and MC4-R. This inverse agonism not only antagonizes the action of melanocortin agonists such as α-MSH but also further decreases the cAMP produced by the affected cells. The exact mechanism by which AgRP inhibits melanocortin-receptor signalling is not completely clear. It has been suggested that Agouti-related protein binds MSH receptors and acts as a competitive antagonist of ligand binding. Studies of Agouti protein in B16 melanoma cells supported this logic. The expression of AgRP in the adrenal gland is regulated by glucocorticoids. The protein blocks α-MSH-induced secretion of corticosterone.

== History ==
Orthologs of AgRP, ASIP, MCIR, and MC4R have been found in mammalian, teleost fish, and avian genomes. This suggests that the agouti-melanocortin system evolved by gene duplication from individual ligand and receptor genes in the last 500 million years.

== Role in obesity ==
AgRP induces obesity by chronic antagonism of the MC4-R. Overexpression of AgRP in transgenic mice (or intracerebroventricular injection) causes hyperphagia and obesity, whilst AgRP plasma levels have been found to be elevated in obese human males. Understanding the role AgRP plays in weight gain may assist in developing pharmaceutical models for treating obesity. AgRP mRNA levels have been found to be down regulated following an acute stressful event. Studies suggest that systems involved in the regulation of stress response and of energy balance are highly integrated. Loss or gain of AgRP function may result in inadequate adaptive behavioural responses to environmental events, such as stress, and have potential to contribute to the development of eating disorders. It has been shown that polymorphisms in the AgRP gene have been linked with anorexia nervosa as well as obesity. Some studies suggest that inadequate signalling of AgRP during stress may result in binge eating. Starvation-induced hypothalamic autophagy generates free fatty acids, which in turn regulate neuronal AgRP levels.

Agouti protein
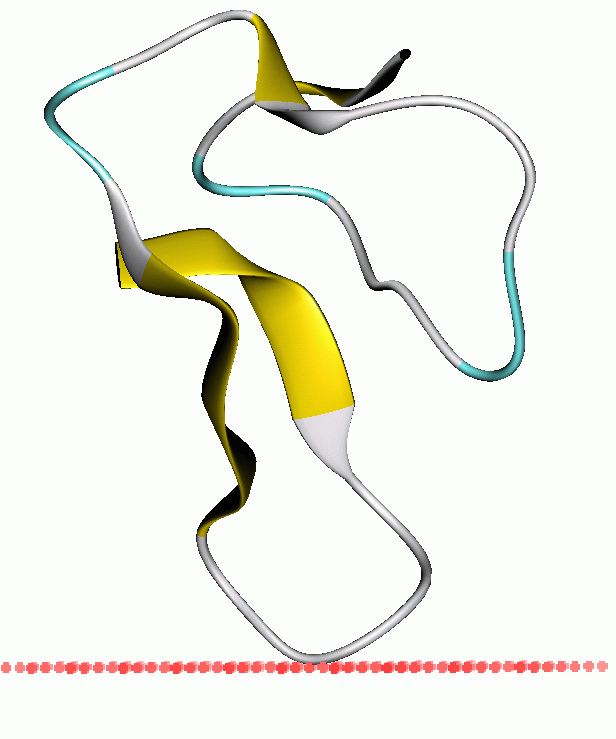

Identifiers
- Symbol: Agouti
- Pfam: PF05039
- Pfam clan: CL0083
- InterPro: IPR007733
- PROSITE: PDOC60024
- SCOP2: 1hyk / SCOPe / SUPFAM
- OPM superfamily: 112
- OPM protein: 1mr0
Available protein structures:
- PDB: IPR007733 PF05039 (ECOD; PDBsum)
- AlphaFold: IPR007733; PF05039

== Role in hunger circuitry ==
According to Mark L. Andermann and Bradford B. Lowell: "...AgRP neurons and the wiring diagram within which they operate can be viewed as the physical embodiment of the intervening variable, hunger." Stimulation of neurons expressing AgRP can induce robust feeding behavior in mice that will trigger: increased food consumption, increased willingness to work for food, and increased investigation of food odors.

Despite this, AgRP neurons are rapidly inhibited upon food presentation and the onset of eating. One mechanism which may account for this discrepancy is the fact that AgRP neurons signal with Neuropeptide Y in order to allow for sustained feeding behavior that outlasts the activation of the neurons.

AgRP neurons are also sensitive to satiety and hunger hormonal signals. One is an appetite stimulant, ghrelin which makes AgRP neurons more excitable through interactions with specialized ghrelin receptors. Another is a satiety signal, leptin, which modulates AgRP activity through inwardly rectifying potassium channels, which alter the excitability of the neurons. Leptin can also decrease the ability of AgRP neurons to carry out other physiological functions, such as triggering Long Term Potentiation of adjacent neurons.

Although AgRP neurons can drive many different phases of feeding behavior, separate AgRP neurons project to different areas of the brain, demonstrating a parallel organizational structure. This is evidenced by different projections of AgRP neurons to various areas of the brain driving different food related behaviors; for example, certain projections will promote increased food consumption, but not increased food odor investigation.

== Human proteins containing this domain ==
AGRP; ASIP

== See also ==
- Proopiomelanocortin
- Agouti (gene)
