= Atumelnant =

Clinical data
- Other names: CRN04894
- Routes of administration: Oral
- Drug class: Melanocortin MC_{2} receptor antagonist

Identifiers
- IUPAC name: N-[(3S)-1-azabicyclo[2.2.2]octan-3-yl]-6-(2-ethoxyphenyl)-3-[(2R)-2-ethyl-4-[1-(trifluoromethyl)cyclobutanecarbonyl]piperazin-1-yl]pyridine-2-carboxamide
- CAS Number: 2392970-97-5
- PubChem CID: 146361282
- IUPHAR/BPS: 13339
- ChemSpider: 129750231
- UNII: NR57FH6U1N
- KEGG: D13102

Chemical and physical data
- Formula: C_{33}H_{42}F_{3}N_{5}O_{3}
- Molar mass: 613.726 g·mol^{−1}
- 3D model (JSmol): Interactive image
- SMILES: CC[C@@H]1CN(CCN1C2=C(N=C(C=C2)C3=CC=CC=C3OCC)C(=O)N[C@@H]4CN5CCC4CC5)C(=O)C6(CCC6)C(F)(F)F
- InChI: InChI=InChI=1S/C33H42F3N5O3/c1-3-23-20-40(31(43)32(14-7-15-32)33(34,35)36)18-19-41(23)27-11-10-25(24-8-5-6-9-28(24)44-4-2)37-29(27)30(42)38-26-21-39-16-12-22(26)13-17-39/h5-6,8-11,22-23,26H,3-4,7,12-21H2,1-2H3,(H,38,42)/t23-,26-/m1/s1; Key:QJRFBKYETDVAJQ-ZEQKJWHPSA-N

Atumelnant (INN; developmental code name CRN04894) is an investigational new drug developed by Crinetics Pharmaceuticals for the treatment of adrenocorticotropic hormone (ACTH)-dependent endocrine disorders. It is a selective antagonist of the melanocortin type 2 receptor (MC2R), also known as the ACTH receptor, which is primarily expressed in the adrenal glands. The drug is orally active. Atumelnant is being evaluated to treat conditions such as congenital adrenal hyperplasia (CAH) and ACTH-dependent Cushing's syndrome caused for example by pituitary adenomas.
