= Melanocortin =

Peptides derived from pro-opiomelanocortin

proopiomelanocortin derivatives

POMC
γ-MSH	ACTH		β-lipotropin
	α-MSH	CLIP	γ-lipotropin	β-endorphin
			β-MSH

The melanocortins are a family of neuropeptide hormones which are the ligands of the melanocortin receptors. The melanocortin system consists of melanocortin receptors, ligands, and accessory proteins. The genes of the melanocortin system are found in chordates. Melanocortins were originally named so because their earliest known function was in melanogenesis. It is now known that the melanocortin system regulates diverse functions throughout the body, including inflammatory response, fibrosis, melanogenesis, steroidogenesis, energy homeostasis, sexual function, and exocrine gland function.

There are four endogenous melanocortin agonists which are derived from post-transcriptional processing of the precursor molecule proopiomelanocortin (POMC). They are adrenocorticotropic hormone (ACTH), α-melanocyte stimulating hormone (MSH), β-MSH, and γ-MSH. In addition to agonists which activate melanocortin receptors, there are two antagonists which inhibit receptor activity, agouti-signaling protein (ASIP) and agouti-related protein (AgRP). Lastly, the ligand β-defensin 3 acts as a neutral melanocortin receptor antagonist.

== Receptors ==
The five melanocortin receptors are seven-transmembrane G-protein coupled receptors with differing ligand affinities, tissue and cell type expression, and downstream functions. MC1R is expressed on melanocytes, macrophages, epithelial cells, endothelial cells, fibroblasts, monocytes and numerous other immune cells, but is also present in brain, testis, and intestine. Its main functions are in melanogenesis and anti-inflammatory signaling. MC2R is expressed in the adrenal cortex and adipocytes and promotes steroidogenesis. MC3R and MC4R are primarily expressed in the brain and regulate energy homeostasis. MC3R is additionally involved in immunomodulation while MC4R has a role in sexual function. MC5R is highly expressed in skin and adrenal glands and has a role in exocrine function. MC2R is activated exclusively by ACTH, whereas the other 4 receptors can be activated by ACTH, α-MSH, β-MSH, and γ-MSH, although the binding affinities differ. For all the melanocortin receptors, binding of an agonistic ligand activates the receptor, leading to dissociation of the G protein and activation of the enzyme adenyl cyclase. Adenyl cyclase then cleaves ATP to generate the second messenger cyclic AMP (cAMP), which in turn activates multiple downstream pathways.

There are two known accessory proteins belonging to the melanocortin system which modulate function of the receptors. These are melanocortin-2-receptor accessory protein (MRAP) and MRAP2.

== Therapeutic uses ==
=== FDA-approved ===
In 2019, the FDA approved the first drug targeting melanocortin receptors, Vyleesi (Bremelanotide) which was developed by Palatin Technologies, Inc. The Melanocortin system has been largely unexplored in drug development but recent approvals, its novelty and wide-spread application across indications has led it to the frontier of new discoveries in medicine. Since Vyleesi approval multiple companies have initiated drug discovery programs targeting the melanocortin system. Bremelanotide (Vyleesi) is approved for treatment of acquired, generalized hypoactive sexual desire disorder (HSDD) in premenopausal women. At therapeutic dose levels, it activates MC1R and MC4R.

Setmelanotide (Imcivree) is an MC4R agonist approved for chronic weight management in patients with genetic obesity.

Afamelanotide (Scenesse) is an MC1R agonist approved for patients with erythropoietic protoporphyria to increase pain-free light exposure.

=== Clinical trials ===
PL9643, an ophthalmic solution, is being tested in phase 3 clinical trials to determine safety and efficacy in patients with dry eye. PL9643 activates MC1R, MC3R, MC4R and MC5R. Completed Phase 2 studies demonstrated positive results for the treatment of dry eye disease.

Dersimelagon (MT-7117) is an orally administered MC1R agonist being tested in phase 3 clinical trials to evaluate safety and tolerability in patients with erythropoietic protoporphyria or X-linked protoporphyria.

Resomelagon (AP1189) is an orally administered MC1R and MC3R agonist being tested in three phase 2 clinical trials to study safety and efficacy in patients with rheumatoid arthritis and idiopathic membranous nephropathy.

== Function ==
The melanocortin system is one of the mammalian body's tools to regulate food intake in a push-pull fashion. The only neurons known to release melanocortins are located in the arcuate nucleus of the hypothalamus. However, melanocortins are also produced by keratinocytes in response to UV exposure. Accordingly, there is a subpopulation called POMC neurons and one called AgRP neurons. When POMC neurons release α-MSH, appetite is decreased. On the other hand, when AgRP neurons release AgRP, appetite is stimulated.

Leptin, the energy surfeit hormone, and Ghrelin, the hunger hormone, are upstream regulators of the melanocortin system in the brain. These hormones also regulate the release of peptides other than the melanocortins. Disturbance of the leptin-melanocortin pathway can lead to early onset obesity as well as various metabolic disorders and suppressed immune function.
