= PL-6983 =

Chemical compound

Clinical data
- Routes of administration: Subcutaneous injection
- Drug class: Melanocortin MC_{4} receptor agonist

Identifiers
- CAS Number: 1966957-74-3
- PubChem SID: 472219121

PL-6983 is a synthetic peptide and selective MC_{4} receptor agonist which is under development by Palatin Technologies for the treatment of female sexual dysfunction and erectile dysfunction. It was developed as a successor to/replacement of bremelanotide (PT-141) due to concerns of the side effect of increased blood pressure seen with the latter in clinical trials. Relative to bremelanotide, PL-6983 produces significantly lower increases in blood pressure in animal models. The drug has reportedly been in pre-clinical development for all medical indications since 2008. Palatin has stated that "We are focusing development efforts on bremelanotide for [female sexual dysfunction], but are continuing evaluation of PL-6983." The chemical structure of PL-6983 has yet to be made public.

== See also ==
- List of investigational sexual dysfunction drugs
- Melanocortin 4 receptor § Agonists
