= Γ-Melanocyte-stimulating hormone =

γ-Melanocyte-stimulating hormone

Names
- IUPAC name L-Tyrosyl-L-valyl-L-methionylglycyl-L-histidyl-L-phenylalanyl-L-arginyl-L-tryptophyl-L-α-aspartyl-L-arginyl-L-phenylalaninamide
- Other names gamma-MSH, γ-melanotropin, γ-melanocortin, γ-intermedin

Identifiers
| CAS Number | 72629-65-3 |
| 3D model (JSmol) | Interactive image |
| ChemSpider | 24603539 |
| PubChem CID | 16146269 |
| CompTox Dashboard (EPA) | DTXSID30657546 |
- InChI: InChI=1S/C74H99N21O16S/c1-41(2)62(95-63(102)49(75)30-44-22-24-47(96)25-23-44)72(111)90-53(26-29-112-3)64(103)84-38-59(97)87-57(34-46-37-80-40-86-46)70(109)92-55(32-43-16-8-5-9-17-43)68(107)88-52(21-13-28-82-74(78)79)67(106)93-56(33-45-36-83-50-19-11-10-18-48(45)50)69(108)94-58(35-60(98)99)71(110)89-51(20-12-27-81-73(76)77)66(105)91-54(65(104)85-39-61(100)101)31-42-14-6-4-7-15-42/h4-11,14-19,22-25,36-37,40-41,49,51-58,62,83,96H,12-13,20-21,26-35,38-39,75H2,1-3H3,(H,80,86)(H,84,103)(H,85,104)(H,87,97)(H,88,107)(H,89,110)(H,90,111)(H,91,105)(H,92,109)(H,93,106)(H,94,108)(H,95,102)(H,98,99)(H,100,101)(H4,76,77,81)(H4,78,79,82)/t49-,51-,52+,53-,54-,55-,56-,57-,58-,62-/m0/s1 Key: GZWUQPQBOGLSIM-XEMHBVLISA-N
- SMILES: CC(C)[C@@H](C(=O)N[C@@H](CCSC)C(=O)NCC(=O)N[C@@H](CC1=CNC=N1)C(=O)N[C@@H](CC2=CC=CC=C2)C(=O)N[C@H](CCCNC(=N)N)C(=O)N[C@@H](CC3=CNC4=CC=CC=C43)C(=O)N[C@@H](CC(=O)O)C(=O)N[C@@H](CCCNC(=N)N)C(=O)N[C@@H](CC5=CC=CC=C5)C(=O)NCC(=O)O)NC(=O)[C@H](CC6=CC=C(C=C6)O)N

Properties
| Chemical formula | C_{74}H_{99}N_{21}O_{16}S |
| Molar mass | 1570.80 g·mol^{−1} |
- Except where otherwise noted, data are given for materials in their standard state (at 25 °C [77 °F], 100 kPa). Infobox references

γ-Melanocyte-stimulating hormone (γ-MSH) is an endogenous peptide hormone and neuropeptide. It is a melanocortin, specifically, one of the three types of melanocyte-stimulating hormone (MSH), and is produced from proopiomelanocortin (POMC). It is an agonist of the MC_{1}, MC_{3}, MC_{4}, and MC_{5} receptors. It exists in three forms, γ_{1}-MSH, γ_{2}-MSH, and γ_{3}-MSH.

γ-MSH regulated cardiovascular functions. γ-MSH effects are measured through the effects it has on the central neural pathway dispersed throughout the kidney. It is not moderated based on tubular sodium transport. Gamma-MSH activates MC3R in renal tubular cells by limiting sodium absorption by inhibiting the central neural pathway. This regulates sodium balance and blood pressure. If MC3R is absent then there is resistance in γ-MSH which results in hypertension on HSD.

== See also ==
- α-Melanocyte-stimulating hormone
- β-Melanocyte-stimulating hormone
- Adrenocorticotropic hormone
