= Melanocortin 4 receptor =

Mammalian protein found in humans

MC4R
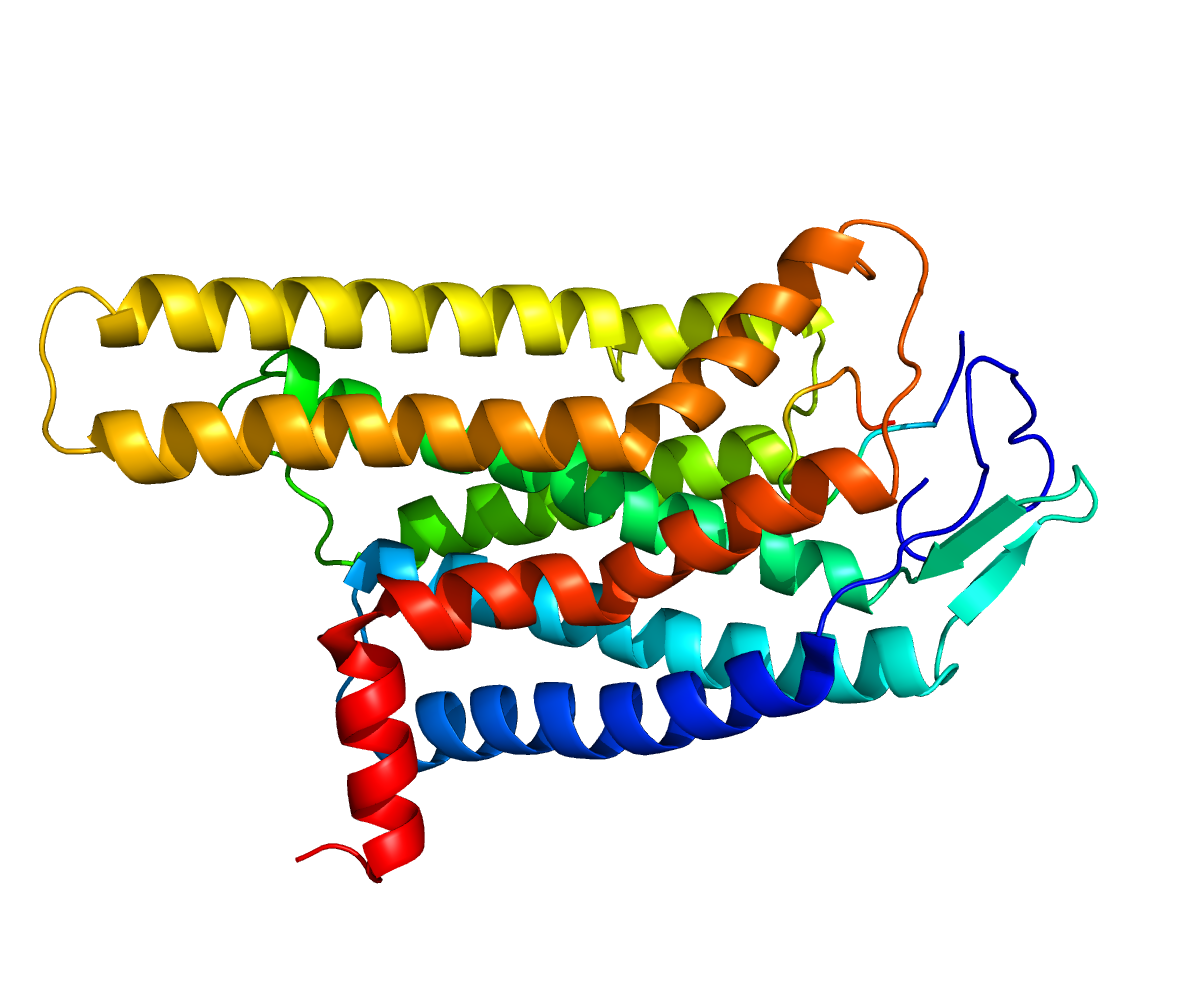

Identifiers
- Aliases: MC4R, Melanocortin 4 receptor, BMIQ20
- External IDs: OMIM: 155541; MGI: 99457; GeneCards: MC4R
Available structures
PDB	Ortholog search: PDBe RCSB
PDB	List of PDB id codes 2IQP, 2IQR, 2IQS, 2IQU, 2IQV, 2IQW

Gene location (Human)
Chr.	Chromosome 18 (human)
Band	18q21.32	Start	60,371,062 bp
Band	18q21.32	End	60,372,775 bp

Gene location (Mouse)
Chr.	Chromosome 18 (mouse)
Band	18|18 E1	Start	66,990,775 bp
Band	18|18 E1	End	66,993,577 bp
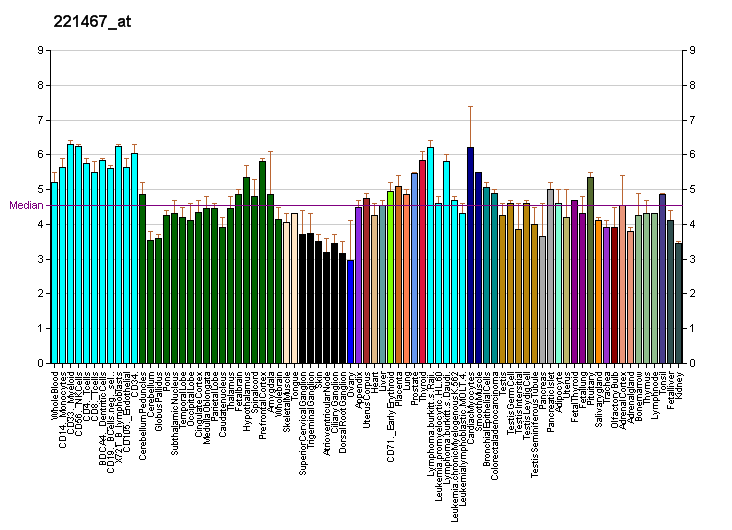
RNA expression pattern
Bgee	Human / Mouse (ortholog); Top expressed in: right uterine tube; prefrontal cortex; hypothalamus; caudate nucleus; anterior cingulate cortex; Brodmann area 9; putamen; nucleus accumbens; right frontal lobe; amygdala / Top expressed in: embryo; embryo; embryo; thyroid gland; dentate gyrus of hippocampal formation granule cell; hippocampus proper; neural tube; primary visual cortex; striatum of neuraxis; Cortex of frontal lobe; More reference expression data
BioGPS	More reference expression data
Gene ontology
Molecular function	G protein-coupled receptor activity; signal transducer activity; peptide hormone binding; melanocyte-stimulating hormone receptor activity; protein binding; melanocortin receptor activity; ubiquitin protein ligase binding; neuropeptide binding; hormone binding
Cellular component	integral component of membrane; membrane; plasma membrane; nucleus
Biological process	regulation of grooming behavior; adenylate cyclase-modulating G protein-coupled receptor signaling pathway; insulin secretion; regulation of feeding behavior; positive regulation of bone resorption; diet induced thermogenesis; response to insulin; feeding behavior; negative regulation of feeding behavior; energy reserve metabolic process; regulation of metabolic process; signal transduction; G protein-coupled receptor signaling pathway; adenylate cyclase-activating G protein-coupled receptor signaling pathway
Sources:Amigo / QuickGO
Orthologs
Databases	NCBI: entry; OMA: entry
Species	Human	Mouse
Entrez	4160	17202
Ensembl	ENSG00000166603	ENSMUSG00000047259
UniProt	P32245	P56450
RefSeq (mRNA)	NM_005912	NM_016977
RefSeq (protein)	NP_005903	NP_058673
Location (UCSC)	Chr 18: 60.37 – 60.37 Mb	Chr 18: 66.99 – 66.99 Mb
PubMed search
- Wikidata
View/Edit Human	View/Edit Mouse

The melanocortin 4 receptor (MC4R) is a G protein-coupled receptor involved in regulating energy homeostasis, appetite, and sexual function. It plays a key role in metabolic processes and it predisposes to certain forms of obesity in humans. MC4R is a receptor that is activated by α-melanocyte-stimulating hormone (α-MSH), influencing energy homeostasis and feeding behavior in the central nervous system. In mouse models, MC4R has been shown to regulate feeding behavior, metabolism, reproductive function, and erectile response.

== Clinical significance ==
The importance of the MC4R in the regulation of human body weight first became apparent in 1998 with the reports from two groups of single families in whom heterozygous frameshift mutations in MC4R cosegregated with dominantly inherited severe early-onset obesity.

In 2009, two very large genome-wide association studies of body mass index (BMI) confirmed the association of common variants about 150 kilobases downstream of the MC4R gene with insulin resistance, obesity, and other anthropometric traits. MC4R may also have clinical utility as a biomarker for predicting individual susceptibility to drug-induced adverse effects causing weight gain and related metabolic abnormalities. Another GWAS performed in 2012 identified twenty SNPs located ~190 Kb downstream of MC4R in association with severe antipsychotic-induced weight gain. This locus overlapped with the region previously identified in the 2009 studies. The rs489693 polymorphism, in particular, sustained a statistically robust signal across three replication cohorts and demonstrated consistent recessive effects. This finding was replicated again by another research group in the following year. In accordance with the above, MC_{4} receptor agonists have garnered interest as potential treatments for obesity and insulin resistance, while MC_{4} receptor antagonists have attracted interest as potential treatments for cachexia. The structures of the receptor in complex with the agonist setmelanotide and the antagonist SHU9119 have been determined.

The MC_{4} receptor agonist bremelanotide (PT-141), sold under the brand name Vyleesi, was approved in the United States as a treatment for low sexual desire in women in 2019. Melanotan II, a synthetic analog of α-MSH, is marketed to the general population for sexual enhancement by internet retailers. PL-6983 and PF-00446687 are under investigation as potential treatments for both female and male sexual dysfunction, including hypoactive sexual desire disorder and erectile dysfunction. The non-selective melanocortin receptor agonist afamelanotide (NDP-α-MSH) has been found to induce brain-derived neurotrophic factor (BDNF) expression in the rodent brain via activation of the MC_{4} receptor and mediate "intense" neurogenesis and cognitive recovery in an animal model of Alzheimer's disease. MC_{4} receptor antagonists produce pronounced antidepressant- and anxiolytic-like effects in animal models of depression and anxiety. And agonists of the MC_{4} receptor such as melanotan II and PF-00446687, via activation of the central oxytocin system, have been found to promote pair bond formation in prairie voles and, due to these prosocial effects, have been suggested as possible treatments for social deficits in autism spectrum disorders and schizophrenia.

It has a prevalence of 1.0–2.5% in people with body mass indices greater than 30, making it the most commonly known genetic defect predisposing people to obesity.

In an exome-wide meta-analysis across three cohorts (UKB, GHS and MCPS), there were 16 genes for which there genetic variants was associated with BMI.

Among the 16 genes, the analysis identified two for which rare mutations are known to cause monogenic obesity: MC4R and PCSK1 (proprotein convertase subtilisin/kexin type 1). One study provides genetic evidence linking rare coding variation to BMI and obesity-related phenotypes.

MC4R gene mutations are associated with early-onset severe obesity. The effect of two exemplary heterozygous coding variants in the MC4R gene (C293R and S94N) are:

• Rapid weight gains from early age (the most important feature).

• Development of severe obesity (BMI ≫97th percentile) at early ages, usually <3 years of age.

• Persistent food-seeking behavior, mostly reported from six months of age.

• Parental/siblings anthropometric data: suspect if relatives present normal anthropometric data.

• Tall stature/increased growth velocity (MC4R monogenic diabetes). There is limited treatment options for the most common form of monogenic obesity, MC4R mutations symptoms can be treated with a Glucagon-like Peptide-1 Receptor Agonist liraglutide which cause weight loss by reducing appetite. They found that the effects of liraglutide 3.0 mg daily for 16 weeks causes weight reducing and glucose lowering and may be relevant treatment in the most common form of monogenic obesity.

== Interactions ==
The MC_{4} receptor has been shown to be activated by peptide hormones encoded by proopiomelanocortin (POMC). POMC is a precursor peptide pro-hormone which is cleaved into several other peptide hormones. All of the endogenous ligands of MC_{4} are produced by cleaving this one precursor peptide. These endogenous agonists include α-MSH, β-MSH, γ-MSH, and ACTH.

== Ligands ==
=== Agonists ===
==== Non-selective ====
- α-MSH
- β-MSH
- γ-MSH
- ACTH
- Afamelanotide
- Bremelanotide
- Melanotan II
- Modimelanotide
- Setmelanotide — MC4 receptor agonist which is FDA approved to help with chronic weight management in those with pathogenic (or uncertain) variants in POMC and certain related genes.

==== Selective ====
- AZD2820
- LY-2112688
- MK-0493
- PF-00446687
- PG-931
- PL-6983
- Ro 27-3225 – also some activity at MC_{1}
- THIQ
- Bivamelagon
- RM-718

=== Antagonists ===
==== Non-selective ====
- Agouti-related peptide
- Agouti signalling peptide
- SHU-8914
- SHU-9005
- SHU-9119

==== Selective ====
- HS-014
- HS-024
- JKC-363
- MCL-0020
- MCL-0042 – also a serotonin reuptake inhibitor
- MCL-0129
- ML-00253764
- MPB-10

=== Unknown ===
- Semax

== Evolution ==
=== Paralogues ===
- MC5R
- MC3R
- MC1R
- MC2R
- S1PR1
- LPAR1
- GPR12
- S1PR3
- LPAR2
- S1PR2
- GPR6
- GPR3
- LPAR3
- GPR119
- CNR1
- S1PR5
- S1PR4
- CNR2

== See also ==
- Melanocortin receptor
