= Β-Melanocyte-stimulating hormone =

β-Melanocyte-stimulating hormone

Names
- IUPAC name H-Ala-Glu-Lys-Lys-Asp-Glu-Gly-Pro-Tyr-Arg-Met-Glu-His-Phe-Arg-Trp-Gly-Ser-Pro-Pro-Lys-Asp-OH
- Other names beta-MSH, β-melanotropin, β-melanocortin, β-intermedin

Identifiers
CAS Number	17908-57-5
3D model (JSmol)	Interactive image
Abbreviations	AEKKDEGPYRMEHFRWGSPPKD
ChEBI	CHEBI:80348
ChEMBL	ChEMBL412536
ChemSpider	17292509
KEGG	C16136
PubChem CID	16172929
CompTox Dashboard (EPA)	DTXSID00583247
- InChI: InChI=1S/C118H174N34O35S/c1-63(122)97(167)135-77(36-39-93(159)160)105(175)137-71(23-8-11-42-119)100(170)136-72(24-9-12-43-120)102(172)147-84(55-95(163)164)111(181)140-76(35-38-92(157)158)98(168)132-60-91(156)150-47-16-28-87(150)112(182)148-81(52-65-31-33-68(154)34-32-65)109(179)138-74(26-14-45-128-117(123)124)101(171)142-79(41-50-188-2)107(177)141-78(37-40-94(161)162)106(176)146-83(54-67-58-127-62-133-67)110(180)144-80(51-64-19-4-3-5-20-64)108(178)139-75(27-15-46-129-118(125)126)103(173)145-82(53-66-57-130-70-22-7-6-21-69(66)70)99(169)131-59-90(155)134-86(61-153)114(184)152-49-18-30-89(152)115(185)151-48-17-29-88(151)113(183)143-73(25-10-13-44-121)104(174)149-85(116(186)187)56-96(165)166/h3-7,19-22,31-34,57-58,62-63,71-89,130,153-154H,8-18,23-30,35-56,59-61,119-122H2,1-2H3,(H,127,133)(H,131,169)(H,132,168)(H,134,155)(H,135,167)(H,136,170)(H,137,175)(H,138,179)(H,139,178)(H,140,181)(H,141,177)(H,142,171)(H,143,183)(H,144,180)(H,145,173)(H,146,176)(H,147,172)(H,148,182)(H,149,174)(H,157,158)(H,159,160)(H,161,162)(H,163,164)(H,165,166)(H,186,187)(H4,123,124,128)(H4,125,126,129)/t63-,71-,72-,73-,74-,75-,76-,77-,78-,79-,80-,81-,82-,83-,84-,85-,86-,87-,88-,89-/m0/s1 Key: XLLJFSCSXTYVTN-UPWOUFKKSA-N
- SMILES: C[C@@H](C(=O)N[C@@H](CCC(=O)O)C(=O)N[C@@H](CCCCN)C(=O)N[C@@H](CCCCN)C(=O)N[C@@H](CC(=O)O)C(=O)N[C@@H](CCC(=O)O)C(=O)NCC(=O)N1CCC[C@H]1C(=O)N[C@@H](CC2=CC=C(C=C2)O)C(=O)N[C@@H](CCCNC(=N)N)C(=O)N[C@@H](CCSC)C(=O)N[C@@H](CCC(=O)O)C(=O)N[C@@H](CC3=CNC=N3)C(=O)N[C@@H](CC4=CC=CC=C4)C(=O)N[C@@H](CCCNC(=N)N)C(=O)N[C@@H](CC5=CNC6=CC=CC=C65)C(=O)NCC(=O)N[C@@H](CO)C(=O)N7CCC[C@H]7C(=O)N8CCC[C@H]8C(=O)N[C@@H](CCCCN)C(=O)N[C@@H](CC(=O)O)C(=O)O)N

Properties
Chemical formula	C_{118}H_{174}N_{34}O_{35}S
Molar mass	2660.95 g·mol^{−1}
- Except where otherwise noted, data are given for materials in their standard state (at 25 °C [77 °F], 100 kPa). Infobox references

β-Melanocyte-stimulating hormone (β-MSH) is an endogenous peptide hormone and neuropeptide. It is a melanocortin, specifically, one of the three types of melanocyte-stimulating hormone (MSH), and is produced from proopiomelanocortin (POMC). It is an agonist of the MC_{1}, MC_{3}, MC_{4}, and MC_{5} receptors. It contains 23 amino acid residues.

β-MSH is also known to decrease food intake in animals such as rats, chicken due to the effect of proopiomelanocortin (POMC). Research was performed to see the effect β-MSH has on chicks, and it has been found that chicks responded with a decrease in food and water intake when treated with β-MSH. The experiment showed that β-MSH causes anorexigenic effects in chicks.

== See also ==
- α-Melanocyte-stimulating hormone
- γ-Melanocyte-stimulating hormone
- Adrenocorticotropic hormone
