= Melanotan II =

Drug that never made it to the market

Names
Pronunciation	/mɛˈlænoʊtæn/
- Systematic IUPAC name L-Lysinamide, N-acetyl-L-norleucyl-L-alpha-aspartyl-L-histidyl-D-phenylalanyl-L-arginyl-L-tryptophyl-, cyclic (2-7)-peptide
- Other names List of other names: Ac-Nle-cyclo[Asp-His-D-Phe-Arg-Trp-Lys]-NH_{2}; Ac-Nle-c[Asp-His-D-Phe-Arg-Trp-Lys]-NH_{2}; Ac-cyclo[Nle^{4}, Asp^{5},D-Phe^{7}, Lys^{10}]α-MSH_{4–10}-NH_{2}; N-Acetyl-L-norleucyl-L-α-aspartyl-L-histidyl-D-phenylalanyl-L-arginyl-L-tryptophyl-L-lysinamide (2→7)-lactam; MT-II

Identifiers
CAS Number	121062-08-6
3D model (JSmol)	Interactive image
ChEMBL	ChEMBL430239
ChemSpider	83450
IUPHAR/BPS	1323
MeSH	melanotan-II
PubChem CID	92432
UNII	UPF5CJ93X7
CompTox Dashboard (EPA)	DTXSID90153135
- InChI: InChI=1S/C50H69N15O9/c1-3-4-16-36(59-29(2)66)44(69)65-41-25-42(67)55-20-11-10-18-35(43(51)68)60-47(72)39(23-31-26-57-34-17-9-8-15-33(31)34)63-45(70)37(19-12-21-56-50(52)53)61-46(71)38(22-30-13-6-5-7-14-30)62-48(73)40(64-49(41)74)24-32-27-54-28-58-32/h5-9,13-15,17,26-28,35-41,57H,3-4,10-12,16,18-25H2,1-2H3,(H2,51,68)(H,54,58)(H,55,67)(H,59,66)(H,60,72)(H,61,71)(H,62,73)(H,63,70)(H,64,74)(H,65,69)(H4,52,53,56)/t35-,36-,37-,38+,39-,40-,41-/m0/s1 Key: JDKLPDJLXHXHNV-MFVUMRCOSA-N
- SMILES: CCCC[C@@H](C(=O)N[C@H]1CC(=O)NCCCC[C@H](NC(=O)[C@@H](NC(=O)[C@@H](NC(=O)[C@H](NC(=O)[C@@H](NC1=O)CC2=CN=CN2)CC3=CC=CC=C3)CCCN=C(N)N)CC4=CNC5=CC=CC=C54)C(=O)N)NC(=O)C

Properties
Chemical formula	C_{50}H_{69}N_{15}O_{9}
Molar mass	1024.198 g·mol^{−1}
- Except where otherwise noted, data are given for materials in their standard state (at 25 °C [77 °F], 100 kPa). verify (what is ?) Infobox references

Structure of melanotan II (full size)

Melanotan II is a synthetic analogue of the peptide hormone α-melanocyte-stimulating hormone (α-MSH) that stimulates melanogenesis to facilitate tanning. It may also increase sexual arousal. Melanotan II was originally developed as a tanning agent based on an earlier drug called afamelanotide (previously "melanotan I"), which is now approved by the FDA for the treatment of a particular rare genetic form of sun sensitivity. Melanotan II was later investigated as a potential treatment for sexual dysfunction, but development was abandoned in 2000 in order to pursue development of bremelanotide, a chemically similar drug later approved by the FDA for treatment of sexual dysfunction in women. Unlicensed melanotan II is found on the internet, although health agencies advise against its use due to legality, case reports suggesting significant safety risks, and potential impurities.

Melanotan II may cause reversible darkening of moles and freckles. It is unclear if melanotan II can increase (or reduce) the risk of developing melanoma, because reports of melanomas have coincided with excessive doses of the peptide, and heavy UV exposure and sun bed use. A 2013 scientific review found there was no conclusive evidence it causes melanoma, and a 2021 review concluded "the increased risk of melanoma in melanotan users, who use it for tanning and exhibit sun-seeking behaviour, can probably be explained by more UV exposure". Side effects may include facial flushing, nausea, and erections in men.

== Mechanism of action ==
Melanotan II acts as a non-selective agonist of the melanocortin receptors MC_{1}, MC_{3}, MC_{4}, and MC_{5}.

Melanotan II produces melanogenesis by activation of the MC_{1} receptor, whereas its clinically documented sexual effects are thought to be related to its ability to activate the MC_{4} receptor (though the MC_{3} is thought to also possibly be involved). Melanotan II is partly metabolized into bremelanotide, a medication used to treat low sexual desire.

Other effects of melanotan II, mostly regarded as adverse effects, include flushing, nausea, vomiting, stretching, yawning, and loss of appetite (the last via activation of MC_{4}).

== History and research ==
Research in the early 1960s showed that in rats, administration of α-MSH caused sexual arousal, and work on this continued in many labs up through the 1980s, when scientists at the University of Arizona began attempting to develop α-MSH and analogs as potential sunless tanning agents, and synthesized and tested several analogs, including melanotan-I and melanotan II. Early in the research process one of the scientists, who was conducting experiments on himself with an early tool compound, melanotan II, injected himself with twice the dose he intended to and got an eight-hour erection, along with nausea and vomiting.

As a tanning agent, melanotan I (now known as afamelanotide) was licensed by Competitive Technologies, a technology transfer company operating on behalf of the University of Arizona, to an Australian startup called Epitan, which changed its name to Clinuvel in 2006. Afamelanotide was approved by the FDA in 2019.

As a sexual dysfunction agent, melanotan II was licensed by Competitive Technologies to Palatin Technologies. Palatin ceased development of melanotan II in 2000 and synthesized, patented, and began to develop bremelanotide, a likely metabolite of melanotan II that differs in that it has a carboxy group where melanotan II has an amide.

Competitive Technologies (Clinuvel) sued Palatin for breach of contract and tried to claim ownership of bremelanotide; the parties settled in 2008 with Palatin retaining rights to bremelanotide, returning rights to melanotan II to Competitive Technologies, and paying US$800,000.

Melanotan II may cause reversible darkening of moles and freckles. It is unclear if melanotan II can increase (or reduce) the risk of developing melanoma. Reports of melanomas associated with the use of melanotan II have coincided with heavy sunbathing and sun bed use. A 2013 scientific review found there was no conclusive evidence it causes melanoma, and a 2021 review concluded "the increased risk of melanoma in Melanotan users, who use it for tanning and exhibit sun-seeking behaviour, can probably be explained by more UV exposure". One review highlighted a series of cases in which subjects developed melanomas out of existing moles following Melanotan II use, although causality was unknown, and the subjects used high doses exceeding 0.16 mg/kg per day. A 2020 in vivo study found that Melanotan II suppressed the progression of melanomas.

== Synthesis ==
In the synthesis of melanotan II, an ε-amino group of lysine and an γ-carboxy group of aspartic acid have their orthogonal protection removed before undergoing a carbodiimide-mediated lactamization, leading to an intermediate. This intermediate, when attached to N-acetylnorleucine, forms melanotan II. The entire process can be accomplished in 12 steps with an overall yield of 2.6%, and the product is more than 90% pure without preparative chromatography.

== Society and culture ==
Numerous products are sold online and in gyms and beauty salons as "melanotan" or "melanotan-1" or "melanotan-2" in their marketing. The unregulated products are not legal to be sold for human usage in any jurisdiction. Starting in 2007, health agencies in various countries began issuing warnings against their use.

== See also ==
- Methoxsalen
