= Α-Melanocyte-stimulating hormone =

Peptide hormone in mammals

α-Melanocyte-stimulating hormone

Names
- IUPAC name N-acetyl-L-seryl-L-tyrosyl-L-seryl-L-methionyl-L-α-glutamyl-L-histidyl-L-phenylalanyl-L-arginyl-L-tryptophylglycyl-L-lysyl-L-prolyl-L-valinamide
- Other names alpha-MSH, α-melanocortin, α-melanotropin, α-intermedin; Ac-Ser-Tyr-Ser-Met-Glu-His-Phe-Arg-Trp-Gly-Lys-Pro-Val-NH_{2}

Identifiers
CAS Number	581-05-5
ChEBI	CHEBI:195325
ChEMBL	ChEMBL214332
ChemSpider	17288804
PubChem CID	16133793
UNII	OVF025LA77
CompTox Dashboard (EPA)	DTXSID50226430
- InChI: InChI=1S/C77H109N21O19S/c1-42(2)64(65(79)106)97-75(116)61-20-13-30-98(61)76(117)54(18-10-11-28-78)88-62(103)38-85-66(107)57(34-46-36-84-50-17-9-8-16-49(46)50)94-67(108)51(19-12-29-83-77(80)81)89-70(111)55(32-44-14-6-5-7-15-44)92-72(113)58(35-47-37-82-41-86-47)95-68(109)52(25-26-63(104)105)90-69(110)53(27-31-118-4)91-74(115)60(40-100)96-71(112)56(33-45-21-23-48(102)24-22-45)93-73(114)59(39-99)87-43(3)101/h5-9,14-17,21-24,36-37,41-42,51-61,64,84,99-100,102H,10-13,18-20,25-35,38-40,78H2,1-4H3,(H2,79,106)(H,82,86)(H,85,107)(H,87,101)(H,88,103)(H,89,111)(H,90,110)(H,91,115)(H,92,113)(H,93,114)(H,94,108)(H,95,109)(H,96,112)(H,97,116)(H,104,105)(H4,80,81,83) Key: WHNFPRLDDSXQCL-UHFFFAOYSA-N; InChI=1/C77H109N21O19S/c1-42(2)64(65(79)106)97-75(116)61-20-13-30-98(61)76(117)54(18-10-11-28-78)88-62(103)38-85-66(107)57(34-46-36-84-50-17-9-8-16-49(46)50)94-67(108)51(19-12-29-83-77(80)81)89-70(111)55(32-44-14-6-5-7-15-44)92-72(113)58(35-47-37-82-41-86-47)95-68(109)52(25-26-63(104)105)90-69(110)53(27-31-118-4)91-74(115)60(40-100)96-71(112)56(33-45-21-23-48(102)24-22-45)93-73(114)59(39-99)87-43(3)101/h5-9,14-17,21-24,36-37,41-42,51-61,64,84,99-100,102H,10-13,18-20,25-35,38-40,78H2,1-4H3,(H2,79,106)(H,82,86)(H,85,107)(H,87,101)(H,88,103)(H,89,111)(H,90,110)(H,91,115)(H,92,113)(H,93,114)(H,94,108)(H,95,109)(H,96,112)(H,97,116)(H,104,105)(H4,80,81,83) Key: WHNFPRLDDSXQCL-UHFFFAOYAP

Properties
Chemical formula	C_{77}H_{109}N_{21}O_{19}S
Molar mass	1664.884 g/mol
- Except where otherwise noted, data are given for materials in their standard state (at 25 °C [77 °F], 100 kPa). verify (what is ?) Infobox references

α-Melanocyte-stimulating hormone (α-MSH) is an endogenous peptide hormone and neuropeptide of the melanocortin family, with a tridecapeptide structure and the amino acid sequence Ac-Ser-Tyr-Ser-Met-Glu-His-Phe-Arg-Trp-Gly-Lys-Pro-Val-NH_{2}. It is the most important of the melanocyte-stimulating hormones (MSHs) (also known as melanotropins) in stimulating melanogenesis, a process that in mammals (including humans) is responsible for pigmentation primarily of the hair and skin. It also plays a role in feeding behavior, energy homeostasis, sexual activity, and protection against ischemia and reperfusion injury.

α-MSH is a non-selective full agonist of the melanocortin receptors MC_{1} (K_{i} = 0.230 nM), MC_{3} (K_{i} = 31.5 nM), MC_{4} (K_{i} = 900 nM), and MC_{5} (K_{i} = 7160 nM), but not MC_{2} (which is exclusive for adrenocorticotropic hormone (ACTH)). Activation of the MC_{1} receptor is responsible for its effect on pigmentation, whereas its regulation of appetite, metabolism, and sexual behavior is mediated through both the MC_{3} and MC_{4} receptors.

It is generated as a proteolyic cleavage product from ACTH (1-13), which is in turn a cleavage product of proopiomelanocortin (POMC).

A few synthetic analogues of α-MSH have been investigated as medicinal drugs due to their photoprotective effects against ultraviolet (UV) radiation from the sun. They include afamelanotide (melanotan) and melanotan II, the former of which has been approved as a treatment to reduce photosensitivity in erythropoietic protoporphyria in the United States. Bremelanotide, another analogue of α-MSH, is available in the United States not as a photoprotective agent, but for the treatment of hypoactive sexual desire disorder in premenopausal women. All of these drugs have significantly greater potencies than α-MSH, along with improved pharmacokinetics and distinctive selectivity profiles.

== See also ==
- β-Melanocyte-stimulating hormone
- γ-Melanocyte-stimulating hormone
- Adrenocorticotropic hormone
