= Afamelanotide =

Chemical compound

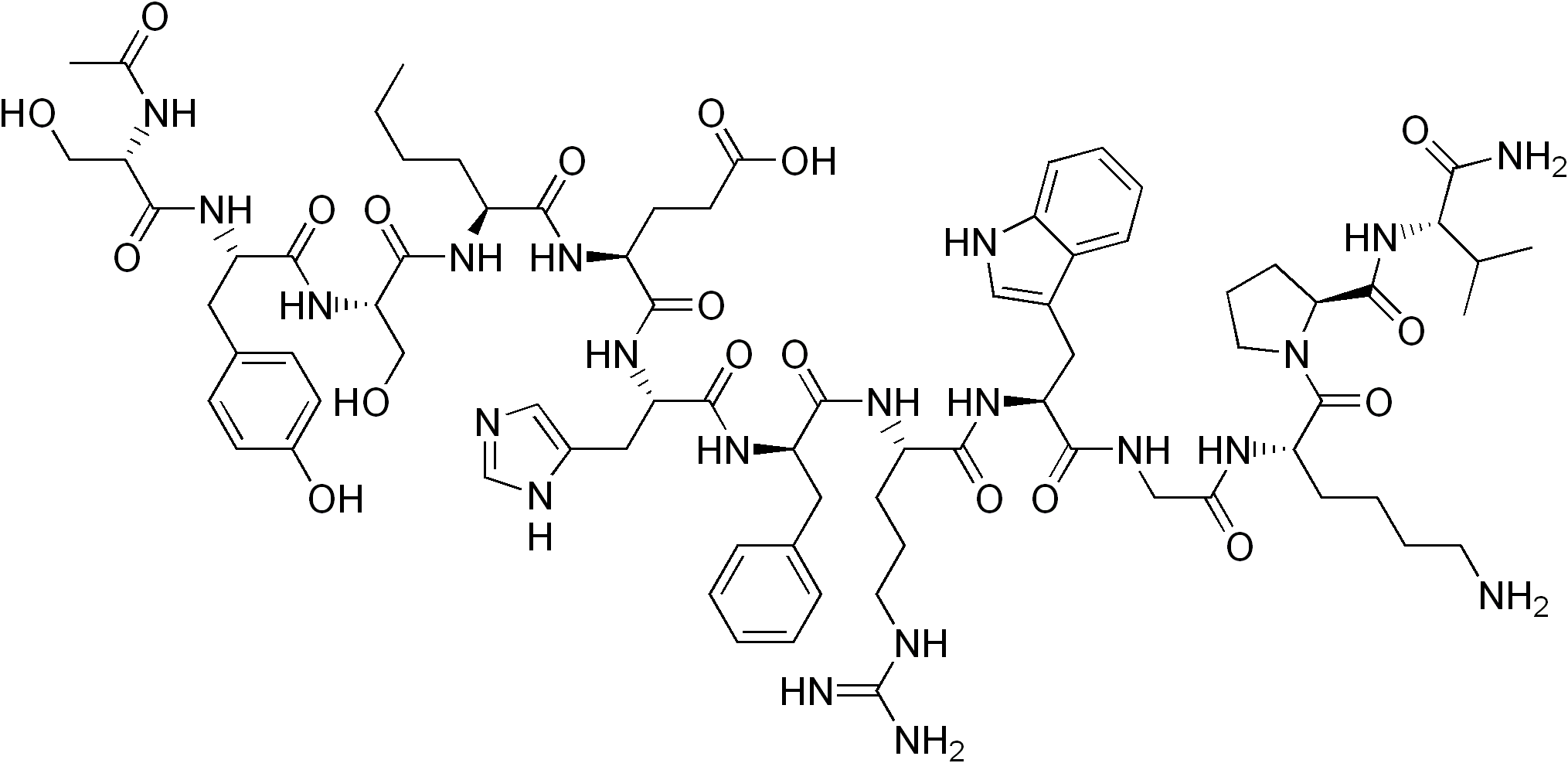

Clinical data
- Pronunciation: /ˌæfəmɛˈlænoʊtaɪd/
- Trade names: Scenesse
- Other names: [Nle^{4},D-Phe^{7}]α-MSH; NDP-α-MSH; NDP-MSH; Melanotan; Melanotan-1; Melanotan I; EPT1647; CUV1647;
- AHFS/Drugs.com: Monograph
- License data: US DailyMed: Afamelanotide
- Pregnancy category: AU: B1
- Routes of administration: Subcutaneous
- ATC code: D02BB02 (WHO)

Legal status
- Legal status: AU: S4 (Prescription only); CA: ℞-only; UK: POM (Prescription only); US: ℞-only; EU: Rx-only

Pharmacokinetic data
- Elimination half-life: 30 minutes

Identifiers
- IUPAC name: N-acetyl-L-seryl-L-tyrosyl-L-seryl-L-norleucyl-L-α-glutamyl-L-histidyl-D-phenylalanyl-L-arginyl-L-tryptophylglycyl-L-lysyl-L-prolyl-L-valinamide
- CAS Number: 75921-69-6
- PubChem CID: 16154396
- IUPHAR/BPS: 1324
- DrugBank: DB04931
- ChemSpider: 17310725
- UNII: QW68W3J66U
- KEGG: D10511; as salt: D11334
- ChEBI: CHEBI:136034
- ChEMBL: ChEMBL441738
- CompTox Dashboard (EPA): DTXSID40226843

Chemical and physical data
- Formula: C_{78}H_{111}N_{21}O_{19}
- Molar mass: 1646.874 g·mol^{−1}
- 3D model (JSmol): Interactive image
- SMILES: CCCCC(C(=O)NC(CCC(=O)O)C(=O)NC(CC1=CN=CN1)C(=O)NC(CC2=CC=CC=C2)C(=O)NC(CCCNC(=N)N)C(=O)NC(CC3=CNC4=CC=CC=C43)C(=O)NCC(=O)NC(CCCCN)C(=O)N5CCCC5C(=O)NC(C(C)C)C(=O)N)NC(=O)C(CO)NC(=O)C(CC6=CC=C(C=C6)O)NC(=O)C(CO)NC(=O)C
- InChI: InChI=1S/C78H111N21O19/c1-5-6-19-52(91-75(116)61(41-101)97-72(113)57(34-46-24-26-49(103)27-25-46)94-74(115)60(40-100)88-44(4)102)68(109)92-54(28-29-64(105)106)70(111)96-59(36-48-38-83-42-87-48)73(114)93-56(33-45-16-8-7-9-17-45)71(112)90-53(22-14-31-84-78(81)82)69(110)95-58(35-47-37-85-51-20-11-10-18-50(47)51)67(108)86-39-63(104)89-55(21-12-13-30-79)77(118)99-32-15-23-62(99)76(117)98-65(43(2)3)66(80)107/h7-11,16-18,20,24-27,37-38,42-43,52-62,65,85,100-101,103H,5-6,12-15,19,21-23,28-36,39-41,79H2,1-4H3,(H2,80,107)(H,83,87)(H,86,108)(H,88,102)(H,89,104)(H,90,112)(H,91,116)(H,92,109)(H,93,114)(H,94,115)(H,95,110)(H,96,111)(H,97,113)(H,98,117)(H,105,106)(H4,81,82,84)/t52-,53-,54-,55-,56+,57-,58-,59-,60-,61-,62-,65-/m0/s1; Key:UAHFGYDRQSXQEB-LEBBXHLNSA-N

Afamelanotide, sold under the brand name Scenesse, is a medication used to prevent phototoxicity and to reduce pain from light exposure for people with erythropoietic protoporphyria, a rare form of genetic sun sensitivity. Afamelanotide is a melanocortin 1 receptor (MC_{1} receptor) agonist and a synthetic peptide and analogue of α-melanocyte stimulating hormone. It is administered as subcutaneous implant.

== Medical uses ==
In the European Union, afamelanotide is indicated for the prevention of phototoxicity in adults with erythropoietic protoporphyria.

In the United States, afamelanotide is indicated for increasing pain-free light exposure in adults with a history of reactions to light (phototoxicity) from erythropoietic protoporphyria.

== Adverse effects ==
The most common reported adverse effects were nausea (19%), headache (20%), and implant site reactions (21%). Uncommon but potentially serious hypersensitivity reactions including anaphylaxis were also reported. Afamelanotide was also found to sometimes induce darkening of certain pre-existing skin conditions, so regular full body skin examinations every 6 months is often recommended.

Other common adverse effects reported during the clinical trials include back pain, upper respiratory tract infections, melanocyte naevus, decreased appetite, migraine, dizziness, weakness, fatigue, lethargy, sleepiness, hot flashes, abdominal pain, diarrhea, vomiting, flushing, development of warts, spots, and freckles, and itchy skin (between 1% and 10% of people). Uncommon and rare adverse effects include cystitis, folliculitis, gastrointestinal infections, hypersensitivity reactions, changes in appetite, depression, insomnia, balance disorders, lethargy, restless leg syndrome, syncope, photophobia, presbyopia, tinnitus, confusion, palpitations, hypertension, hypercholesterolaemia, and weight gain.

== Pharmacology ==
Afamelanotide is a synthetic tridecapeptide and a structural analogue of α-melanocyte stimulating hormone (α-MSH). It is a melanocortin receptor agonist and binds predominantly to the MC_{1} receptor. Its binding lasts longer than that of α-MSH. This results in part from afamelanotide's resistance to immediate degradation by serum or proteolytic enzymes. It is thought to cause skin darkening by binding to the MC_{1} receptor which in turn drives melanogenesis.

It has a short half-life of approximately 30 minutes. After administration with implantation into the skin, the majority of the drug is released within two days, with 90% released by the fifth day. By the tenth day, no drug is detectable in plasma.

The details of drug distribution, metabolism and excretion remain unclear (as of 2026), but since it is a small peptide with a short half-life, it is expected that it is quickly broken down into shorter peptide fragments and amino acids.

== Chemistry ==
Afamelanotide has the amino acid sequence; Ac-Ser-Tyr-Ser-Nle-Glu-His-D-Phe-Arg-Trp-Gly-Lys-Pro-Val-NH_{2}.

It is also known as [Nle^{4},D-Phe^{7}]-α-MSH, which is abbreviated to NDP-MSH or NDP-α-MSH.

Afamelanotide is the international nonproprietary name.

== History ==
α-MSH was first isolated in the 1950s and its primary structure determined. By the 1960s, its role in promoting melanin diffusion was understood.

In the 1980s, the University of Arizona synthesised more potent analogs of a-MSH, including afamelanotide. Afamelanotide was initially named melano-tan (or melanotan-I) due to its ability to tan skin with minimal sun exposure. Later, melanotan-II was synthesised.

Following initial development at the University of Arizona as a sunless tanning agent, the Australian company Clinuvel conducted further clinical trials in that and other indications, and brought the drug to market in the European Union, the United States, and Australia.

To pursue the tanning agent, melanotan-I was licensed by Competitive Technologies, a technology transfer company operating on behalf of University of Arizona, to an Australian startup called Epitan, which changed its name to Clinuvel in 2006.

Early clinical trials showed that the peptide had to be injected about ten times a day due to its short half-life, so the company collaborated with Southern Research in the US to develop a depot formulation that would be injected under the skin, and release the peptide slowly. This was done by 2004.

Multiple studies on the clinical effects of afamelanotide were conducted. According to ClinicalTrials.gov, Clinuvel sponsored several trials between 2007 and 2011 to explore its effects on erythropoietic protoporphyria, vitiligo, polymorphous light eruption, solar urticaria and acne vulgaris. Additionally, one trial aimed to assess its role in preventing actinic keratosis in organ transplant recipients. Further trials were pursued for the first two conditions, while results for the latter three were not published. Following the initial trials, research efforts centered on erythropoietic protoporphyria, and due to the epidemiology of the condition. Clinuvel secured orphan drug for afamelanotide in both the US and the EU by 2010.

The first approval of afamelanotide came in May 2010 from the Italian Medicines Agency (AIFA, or Agenzia Italiana del Farmaco), followed by the European Medicines Agency (EMA) in January 2015. Both approvals were for the treatment of erythropoietic protoporphyria.

The US Food and Drug Administration (FDA) granted approval in October 2019 for the use of afamelanotide as a medication to alleviate pain caused by sun exposure in individuals with erythropoietic protoporphyria. This decision was largely based on three trials involving 244 adults aged 18–74 across 22 sites in the US and Europe, which had a focus on pain-free hours in sunlight, outdoor hours under varying light conditions, and side effects. The FDA designated it as a first-in-class medication, meaning it had a novel mechanism different from previously approved medications.

Between 2022 and 2023, trials were outlined to study the effects of afamelanotide on xeroderma pigmentosum and variegate porphyria, along with two additional trials exploring its impact on vitiligo. According to the register, as of April 2025, most of these trials are currently in the recruitment phase.

== Society and culture ==
=== Usage in general public ===
A number of products are sold online and in gyms and beauty salons as "melanotan" or "melanotan-1" which discuss afamelanotide in their marketing.

Without a prescription, these drugs are not legally sold in many jurisdictions and are potentially dangerous.

Starting in 2007, health agencies in various countries began issuing warnings against their use.
