= Fluorometholone acetate =

Chemical compound

Clinical data
- Trade names: Flarex, Florate, Omnitrol
- Other names: Oxylone acetate; 1-Dehydro-9α-fluoro-11β,17α-dihydroxy-6α-methylprogesterone 17α-acetate; 17α-Acetoxy-9α-fluoro-11β-hydroxy-6α-methylpregna-1,4-diene-3,20-dione
- Drug class: Corticosteroid; Glucocorticoid; Progestogen

Identifiers
- IUPAC name: [(6S,8S,9R,10S,11S,13S,14S,17R)-17-acetyl-9-fluoro-11-hydroxy-6,10,13-trimethyl-3-oxo-6,7,8,11,12,14,15,16-octahydrocyclopenta[a]phenanthren-17-yl] acetate
- CAS Number: 3801-06-7
- PubChem CID: 240767
- ChemSpider: 210390
- UNII: 9I50C3I3OK
- KEGG: D04221
- ChEBI: CHEBI:78354
- ChEMBL: ChEMBL1201064
- CompTox Dashboard (EPA): DTXSID20191424
- ECHA InfoCard: 100.021.156

Chemical and physical data
- Formula: C_{24}H_{31}FO_{5}
- Molar mass: 418.505 g·mol^{−1}
- 3D model (JSmol): Interactive image
- SMILES: [H][C@@]12CC[C@](OC(C)=O)(C(C)=O)[C@@]1(C)C[C@]([H])(O)[C@@]1(F)[C@@]2([H])C[C@]([H])(C)C2=CC(=O)C=C[C@]12C
- InChI: InChI=1S/C24H31FO5/c1-13-10-19-17-7-9-23(14(2)26,30-15(3)27)22(17,5)12-20(29)24(19,25)21(4)8-6-16(28)11-18(13)21/h6,8,11,13,17,19-20,29H,7,9-10,12H2,1-5H3/t13-,17-,19-,20-,21-,22-,23-,24-/m0/s1

Fluorometholone acetate, also known as oxylone acetate and sold under the brand names Flarex, Florate, and Omnitrol, is a synthetic glucocorticoid corticosteroid and a corticosteroid ester, as well as a progestogen and progestogen ester. It is the C17α acetate ester of fluorometholone.

In addition to its potent corticosteroid activity, fluorometholone acetate is a progestogen. It has been studied in the treatment of breast cancer in women and has been found to be effective, producing remission in about 20% of women with advanced breast cancer at an oral dosage of 50 mg/day. However, it also produces severe Cushing's syndrome-like symptoms like plethora, moon face, glycosuria, marked weight gain, hypertension, and osteoporosis at this dosage due to its glucocorticoid activity.

== See also ==
- Flumedroxone acetate
- Mometasone furoate
