= Inferior petrosal sinus sampling =

Inferior petrosal sinus sampling (or IPSS), is a diagnostic medical procedure used to determine whether excess adrenocorticotropic hormone (ACTH) is coming from the pituitary gland (usually a pituitary adenoma causing Cushing's disease) or from a source outside the pituitary (a rare tumor causing ectopic ACTH syndrome). The procedure is usually reserved for patients with consistent ACTH-dependent Cushing's syndrome without a clear cut lesion on pituitary MRI.

== Procedure ==
The procedure is typically performed in large medical centers by an experienced interventional radiologist, neurologist or neurosurgeon and guided using fluoroscopy. Catheters are inserted through the jugular or femoral veins into both inferior petrosal veins which drain blood from the pituitary gland. To maximize and stabilize the pulsatile ACTH secretion, a dose of intravenous corticotropin-releasing hormone (CRH) is usually given. ACTH levels are measured in the petrosal (central) and peripheral venous plasma before and within 10-12 minutes after administration of CRH. Where CRH is unavailable some centers use desmopressin. Measurement of the central-to-peripheral prolactin ratio can assist in verifying the correct placement of the catheters as well as in normalization of ACTH levels. In experienced centers, successful bilateral catheterization is reported in up to 90% of cases with very rare major complications.

== Interpretation ==
In patients with true hypercortisolism, a central-to-peripheral ACTH gradient of ≥2 before, or ≥3 after CRH administration, is considered diagnostic for a pituitary source of ACTH. Some studies have shown that if catheters were appropriately placed, a gradient of ≥1.4 for ACTH concentrations between the two sinuses predicted the side of the tumor with ~70% accuracy.
