= Primary pigmented nodular adrenocortical disease =

- Other names: PPNAD
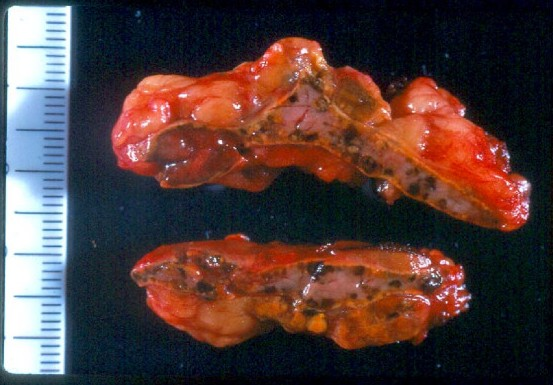
- Macroscopic appearance of adrenal gland in PPNAD following adrenalectomy

Primary pigmented nodular adrenocortical disease (PPNAD) was first reported in 1984 by Carney et al. PPNAD is a rare form of adrenocorticotropic hormone (ACTH)-independent Cushing's syndrome, resulting in the enlargement of the cortex of the adrenal glands.

It often occurs in association with Carney complex (CNC), a rare syndrome that involves the formation of abnormal tumours that cause endocrine hyperactivity.

== Signs and symptoms ==
Diagram of Cushing's symptoms

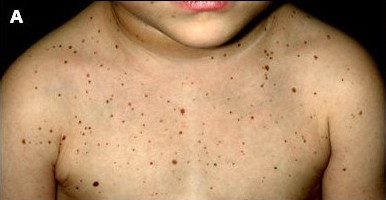
Picture of lentigines associated with Carney Complex

PPNAD is a rare cause of high cortisol levels in the blood.

PPNAD can present with overt, subclinical, cyclic, or atypical forms of hypercortisolism, which can make diagnosis difficult. The effects of PPNAD can often be cyclical so the symptoms of Cushing's syndrome will not always be as severe, which may complicate diagnosis. High cortisol levels can lead to psychological disturbances such as anxiety or depression and insomnia. Bone health can deteriorate, leading to an increased fracture risk.

The classic symptoms of Cushing's syndrome include rapid central weight gain, a puffy red face (also known as 'moon face'), and a buffalo hump at the back of the neck due to fat deposits. Skin changes in Cushing's syndrome include thinning and bruising easily, developing striae and hyperpigmentation at skin folds. The hormonal changes can lead to hirsutism, males developing breast tissue, females no longer having periods and both sexes may become infertile.

PPNAD often occurs in late childhood or adolescents, and patients may have a shorter stature than average, due to ACTH-dependent growth suppression. Women have a significantly higher prevalence of PPNAD than men, with women being diagnosed at a younger age.

CNC is found to be a co-morbidity with PPNAD within 66% of patients, and 94.29% of patients with PPNAD will have osteoporosis/osteopenia.

CNC is usually inherited, however it can also occur sporadically. A visible sign of CNC is abnormal, spotty skin hyperpigmentation. There may also be myxomas which can appear as lumps in the skin and breast as well as often being present in the heart, which can lead to multiple cardiovascular problems. The majority of people with PPNAD will have some of these signs/symptoms due to the strong association between PPNAD and CNC.

== Characterisation ==
PPNAD is characterised by small, pigmented micronodules on the adrenal cortex which often produce cortisol.

== Causes ==
The main cause of isolated PPNAD is a mutation of PRKAR1α, located at chromosome 17q22-24, which is the gene encoding the regulatory R1α subunit of protein kinase A (PKA). Germline heterozygous PRKAR1α inactivation mutations are present in 80% of CNC patients affected by Cushing's syndrome. There are over 117 mutations of the PRKAR1α gene that can cause CNC, with many of these mutations producing premature stop codons, thus resulting in the complete loss of PRKAR1α protein. CNC patients have also been discovered with an unusually shortened PRKAR1α protein, detected in tumours and leukocytes, following a splice-site mutation, which causes exon-6 skipping. Therefore, both haploinsufficiency and the complete loss of PRKAR1α can lead to the increased PKA activity observed in PPNAD patients, due to the disruption of the cyclic-adenosine monophosphate (cAMP) signalling pathway. cAMP signalling is important in endocrine function and development, and dysregulation can lead to disease.

Sahut-Barnola et al. used a mice model to conditionally knockout the PRKAR1A gene from cells of the adrenal cortex and observed that PRKAR1A gene knockout resulted in the development of pituitary gland-independent Cushing's syndrome, as well as an increase in PKA activity. The R1α loss caused the adrenal glands to become hyperactive and hyperplastic, through the resurgence of fetal-like cells with cell renewal defects within the adult adrenal cortex, which resulted in tumor growths. This mouse KO model reflects development of PPNAD in human cases.

Inactivation of phosphodiesterase 11 A4 (PDE11A4), located at 2q31-5, has also been identified in PPNAD patients without PRKAR1α mutations. PDE11A4 is another participant of the cAMP signalling pathway.

== Diagnosis ==
Diagnosis usually occurs upon histological investigation for causes of suspected Cushing's syndrome. High levels of cortisol observed in patients with PPNAD are not suppressed upon administration of dexamethasone (dexamethasone suppression test), and upon MRI or CT imaging, the pituitary will show no abnormalities. Measuring ACTH will confirm that the cause of the patients Cushing's syndrome is ACTH-independent. The nature of Cushing's syndrome itself is periodic, which can make diagnosing PPNAD increasingly difficult, and the small nodules on the adrenal glands can be missed on CT.

Histologically, PPNAD presents as multiple small adrenocorical nodules with cytoplasmic pigmentation and inter-nodular cortical atrophy.

Diagnosis of PPNAD can be difficult to determine preoperatively as CT scan findings can be variable i.e. appear normal or suggest unilateral adrenal lesions therefore impeding the correct diagnosis. NP-59 scintigraphy may be particularly useful in identifying the bilateral nature of the disease.

Gene studies are not necessary for diagnosis as there are clear gross and histological diagnostic markers, as the nodules can usually be seen clearly in both cases A positive family history of PPNAD has been shown to be associated with abnormal histological findings, e.g. mitotic figures, which may further hinder diagnosis. At the point where abdominal CT scanning and pituitary fossa MRI show no clear abnormalities, adrenalectomy may be performed.

== Treatment ==
After diagnosis, it is important for patients to be continually monitored. The most common treatment for PPNAD is replacement therapy and bilateral laparoscopic adrenalectomy; the process by which both adrenal glands are removed by a small incision.

Patients who have received an adrenalectomy will also be prescribed a replacement therapy of mineralocorticoid and glucocorticoid steroids to maintain physiological levels.
