= Evelyn M. Anderson =

American physiologist and biochemist

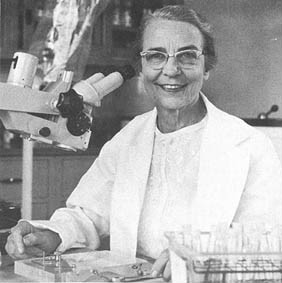
- Evelyn M. Anderson in an undated NASA photograph
- Born: March 20, 1899; Wilmar, Minnesota, USA
- Died: June 8, 1985 (aged 86)
- Education: Carleton College; University of California, Berkeley; University of Montreal
- Spouse: Webb Edward Haymaker (m. 1936; died 1984)
- Children: 3
- Awards: Guggenheim Fellowship (1946)

Evelyn M. Anderson (March 20, 1899 – June 8, 1985) was an American physiologist and biochemist, most known for her co-discovery of adrenocorticotropic hormone (adreno-cortical thyroid hormone or ACTH) in 1934.

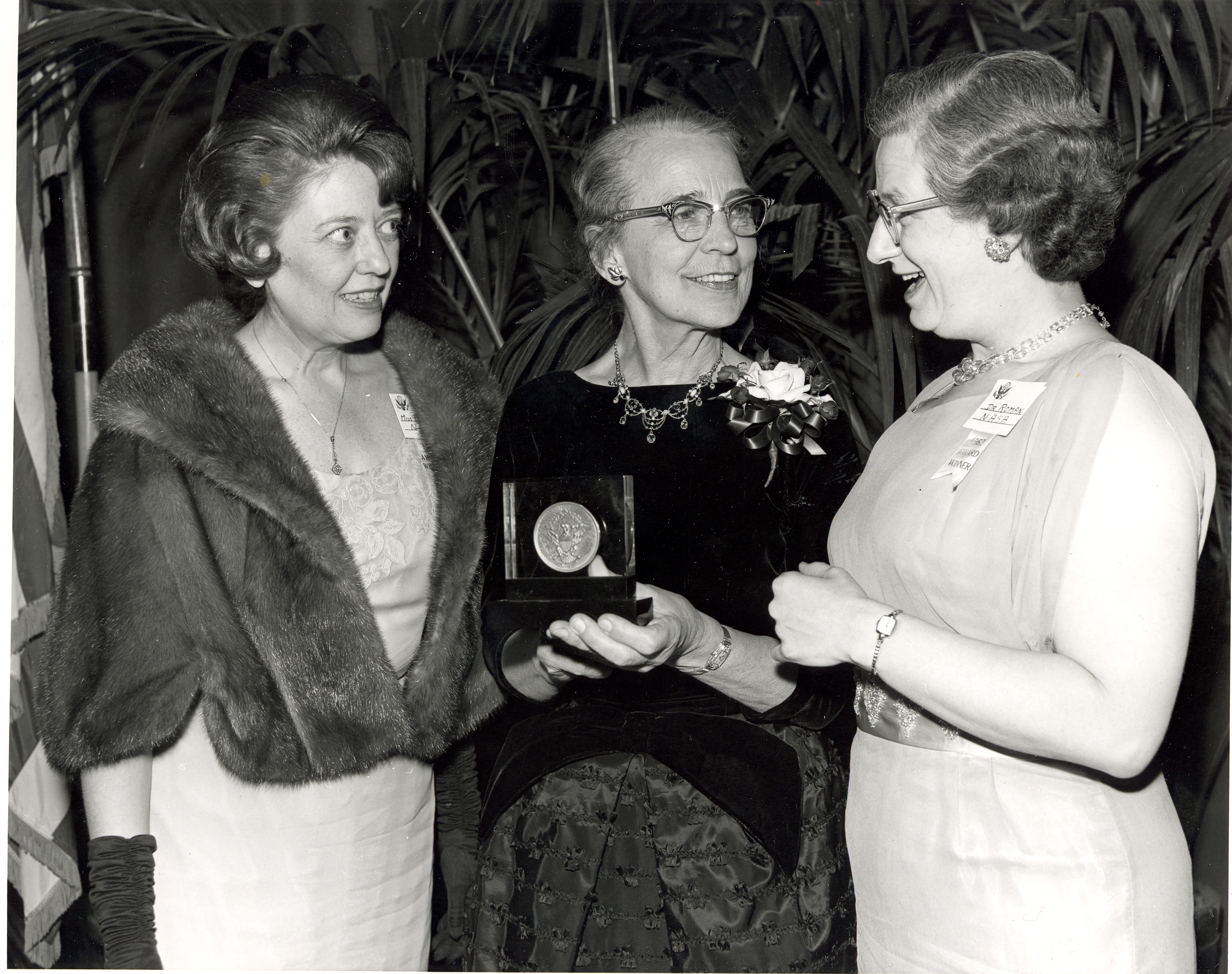
Anderson (center) with Eleanor C. Pressly (left) and Nancy Grace Roman, at a 1964 award ceremony

== Background ==
Evelyn Anderson was born in Willmar, Minnesota, to Swedish immigrants parents. She attended Carleton College in Northfield, Minnesota, where she obtained her bachelor's. In 1928, she gained her M.D. from the University of California, San Francisco, School of Medicine. During her time at Berkeley, her research culminated into two papers about vitamin A and nutrition. She continued on to receive her Ph.D. in biochemistry from the University of Montreal in 1934. While working on her dissertation, Anderson co-discovered ACTH with James Collip and David Landsborough Thomson. In a paper published in 1933, she explained its function in the body. In 1935 she published another paper with Collip on the discovery of an anti-thyroid hormone which greatly contributed to the general knowledge and understanding of anti-hormones.

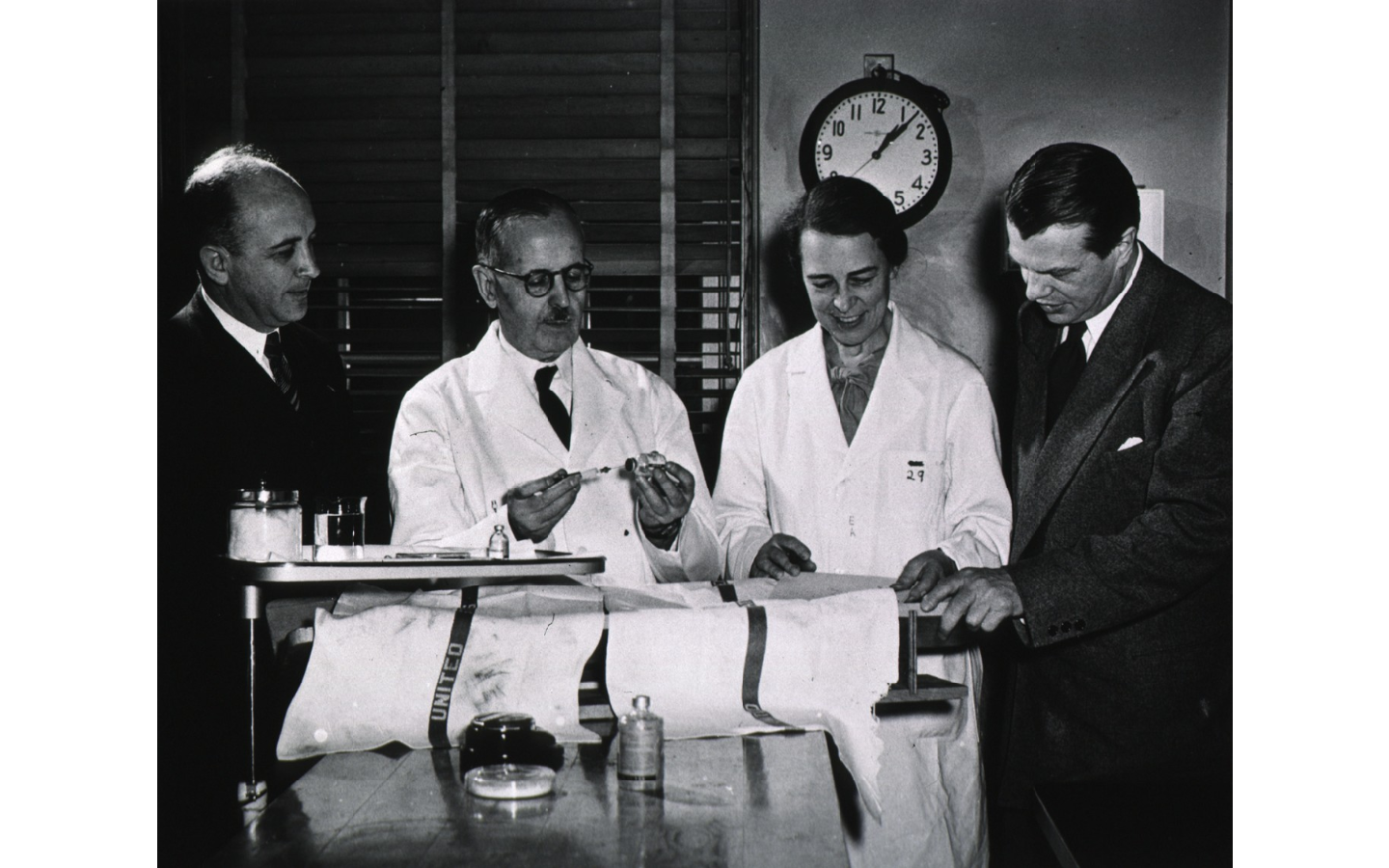
Anderson with William Sebrell, Bernardo Houssay and Floyd Doft

== Career ==
Anderson returned to the University of California to instruct and became an associate professor of medicine in 1946, while continuing her research on hormone related diseases. Most notably she discovered with her husband Webb E. Haymaker that Cushing's disease is caused by hyper function of the adrenal cortex. Anderson also worked with Joseph Abraham Long, professor of embryology, to develop an apparatus to study the secretions of insulin from the pancreas in a rat model. This model and technique were later used with an immunochemical assay for human insulin. In 1946, Anderson received an award from the John Simon Guggenheim Memorial Foundation to work with Phillip Bard, professor and director of the Department of Physiology at Johns Hopkins University.

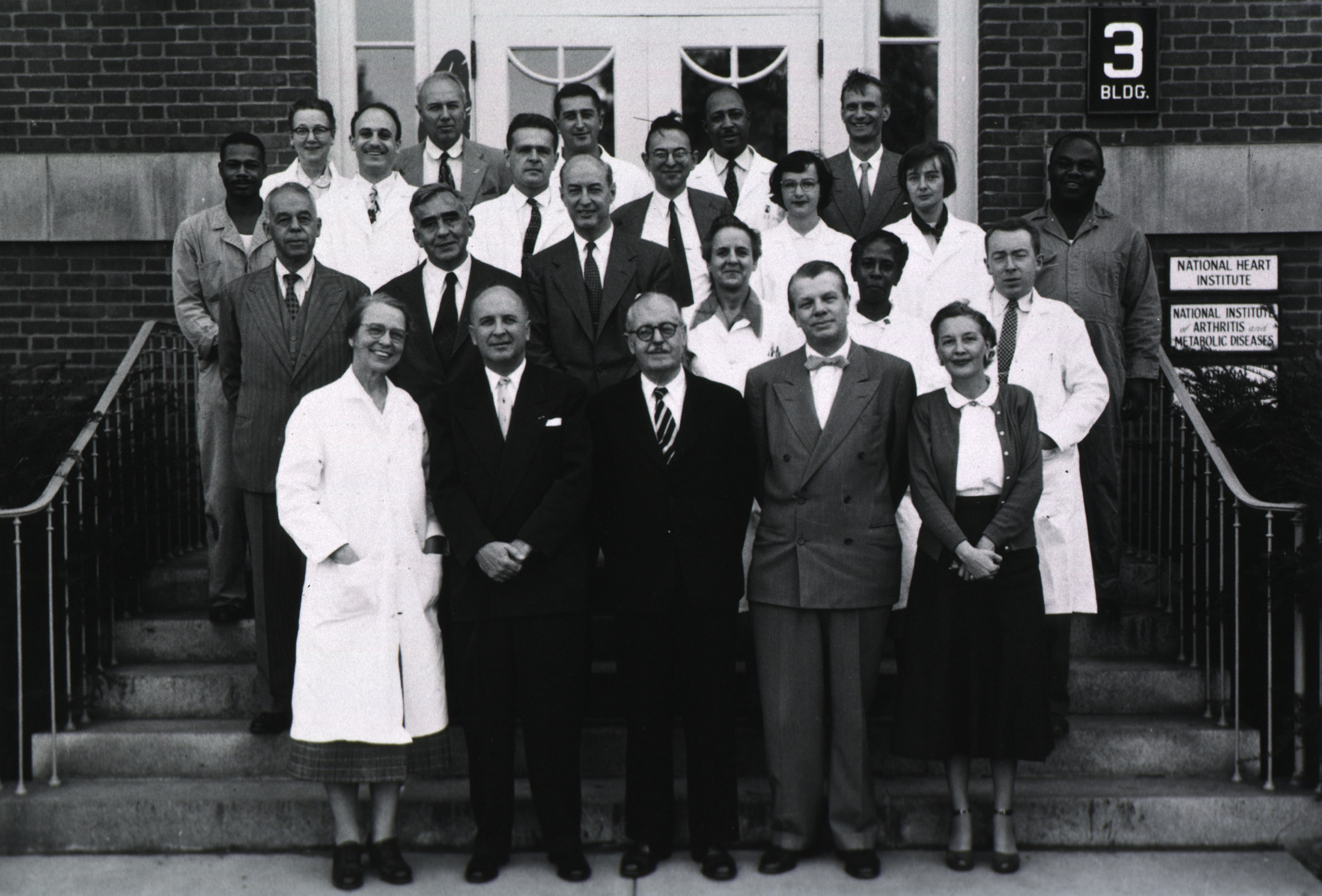
Anderson and the Endocrinology section at the NIH

She then moved to the National Institute of Arthritis and Metabolic Diseases (NIAMD) at the National Institute of Health where she became the chief of Secretion on Endocrinology (1947-1962). She was vice president and program chairman of the Endocrine Society (1951-1952). Anderson became a visiting professor of physiology at Howard University in 1955, where her research focused on hypothalamic regulation of metabolism. In 1962 she returned to California where she became head of neuroendocrinology at NASA's Ames Research Center (1962-1969). She retired from this position in 1969. During the course of her career, she published over one hundred research papers.

== Personal life ==
Anderson was married in 1936 to noted neurologist Webb Edward Haymaker, M.D. (1902–1984) with whom she had three children and eight grandchildren.

== Award and honors ==
- John Simon Guggenheim Memorial Foundation Award (1946)
- Honorary doctorate from Carleton College (1954)
- Honorary doctorate from the Women's Medical College of Pennsylvania (1961)
- Federal Women's Award recipient (1964)
- In 2019, Carleton College opened a new, modern science building named Anderson Hall in honor of Evelyn M. Anderson.
