= Corticosteroid-induced lipodystrophy =

- Specialty: Dermatology

Corticosteroid-induced lipodystrophy (CIL) is a condition of abnormal fat deposition caused by corticosteroid medications. Fat accumulates in the facial area ("moon face"), dorsocervical region ("buffalo hump"), and abdominal area ("pot belly" or "beer belly"), whereas the thickness of subcutaneous fat in the limbs is decreased. The resulting appearance has been described as "Cushingoid", in relation to the fact that it also occurs in individuals with Cushing's syndrome (abnormally high cortisol levels). The condition is considered by patients to be the most distressing side effect caused by corticosteroids.

Short-term therapy (<3 months) with 10 to 30 mg/day of a prednisone equivalent has been reported to be associated with Cushingoid traits in 15 to 40%. Long-term therapy (>3 months) with corticosteroids has been associated with Cushingoid features in 32 to 83% of individuals. However, these symptoms have mostly been diagnosed in a subjective and observer-dependent manner. In a prospective study, the cumulative incidence of CIL with high-dose prednisone therapy was found to be 61% after 3 months, 65% after 6 months, 68% after 9 months, and 69% after 12 months. One study found that even a very low dosage of prednisone of 5 mg/day was associated with symptoms of "Cushing's syndrome". It has been said that data on risk factors for CIL, such as corticosteroid dosage or duration of therapy, is surprisingly sparse. Possible risk factors for CIL include high residual cortisol secretion, decreased clearance of corticosteroids, female sex, younger age (<50 years), high initial body-mass index, and high caloric intake.

CIL has been found to be usually reversible at prednisone-equivalent dosages of less than 10 mg/day. A low-calorie diet may be considered to limit the risk of CIL or to attempt to reverse it. CIL is not merely an aesthetic adverse effect, as it has been associated with features of metabolic syndrome such as insulin resistance, dyslipidemia, and high blood pressure.

== See also ==
- Steroid dementia syndrome
- Steroid diabetes
- Steroid-induced osteoporosis
- Steroid induced skin atrophy
