= Flumedroxone =

Chemical compound

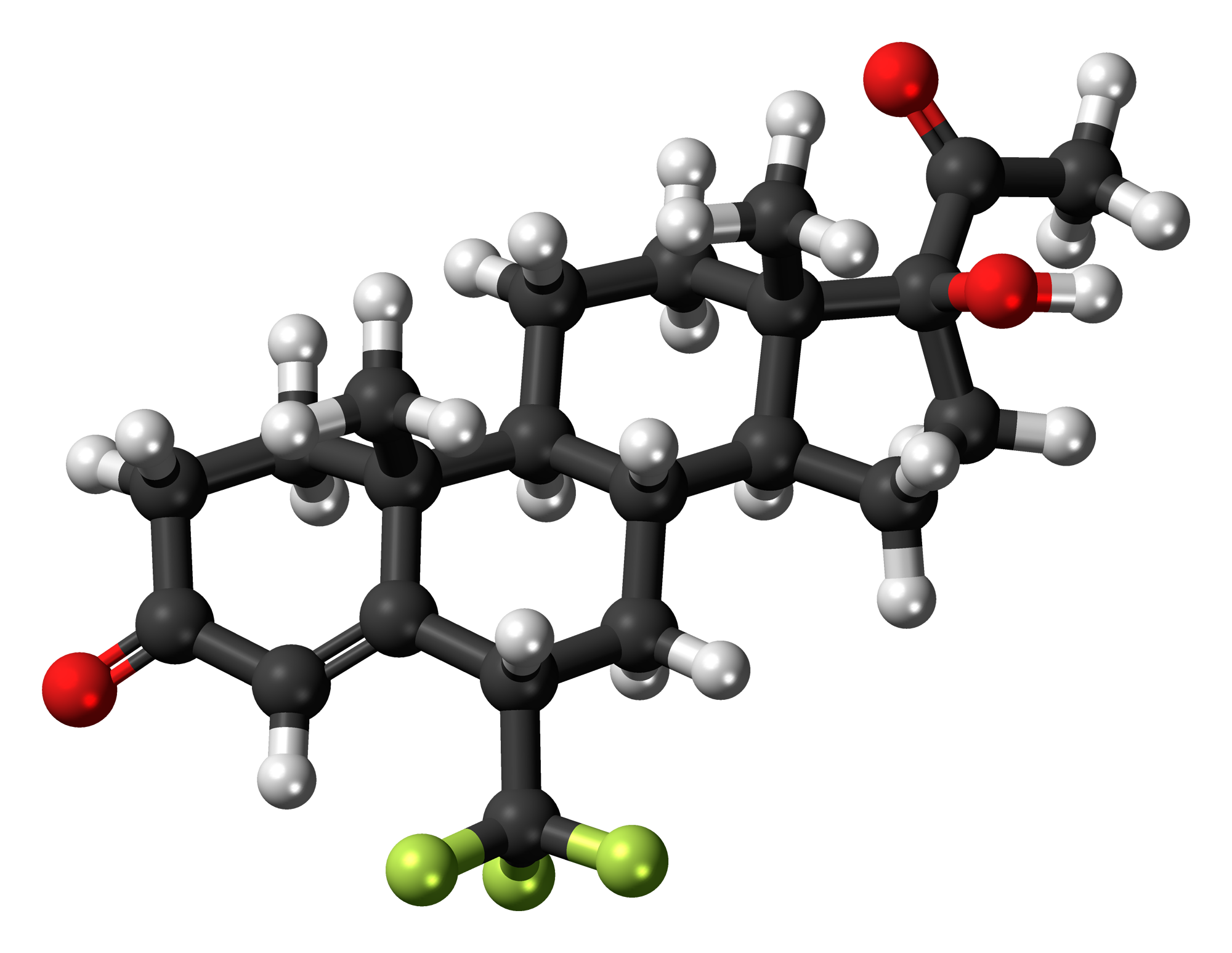

Clinical data
- Other names: 17α-Hydroxy-6α-(trifluoromethyl)pregn-4-ene-3,20-dione; 6α-Trifluoromethyl-17α-hydroxyprogesterone

Identifiers
- IUPAC name: (2R,8S,14S,15S)-14-acetyl-14-hydroxy-2,15-dimethyl-8-(trifluoromethyl)tetracyclo[8.7.0.0^{2,7}.0^{11,15}]heptadec-6-en-5-one
- CAS Number: 15687-21-5; Acetate salt: 987-18-8
- PubChem CID: 71881
- ChemSpider: 16736667
- UNII: K80185F39X; Acetate salt: S0S93EK936
- ChEMBL: ChEMBL2104932
- CompTox Dashboard (EPA): DTXSID40905080

Chemical and physical data
- Formula: C_{22}H_{29}F_{3}O_{3}
- Molar mass: 398.466 g·mol^{−1}
- 3D model (JSmol): Interactive image
- SMILES: CC(=O)[C@]1(CC[C@@H]2[C@@]1(CC[C@H]3[C@H]2C[C@@H](C4=CC(=O)CC[C@]34C)C(F)(F)F)C)O
- InChI: InChI=1S/C22H29F3O3/c1-12(26)21(28)9-6-16-14-11-18(22(23,24)25)17-10-13(27)4-7-19(17,2)15(14)5-8-20(16,21)3/h10,14-16,18,28H,4-9,11H2,1-3H3/t14-,15+,16+,18+,19-,20+,21+/m1/s1; Key:CDZJOBWKHSYNMO-SCUQKFFVSA-N

Flumedroxone is a steroidal progestogen of the 17α-hydroxyprogesterone group that was never marketed. The C17α acetate ester of flumedroxone, flumedroxone acetate, has been marketed as an antimigraine drug.
