= N-Terminal peptide of proopiomelanocortin =

Identifiers
- Symbol: N-POMC
- Alt. symbols: NPP; pro-γ-MSH

The N-terminal peptide/fragment of proopiomelanocortin (NPP; N-POMC), also known as pro-γ-MSH, is a naturally occurring, endogenous metabolite of the polypeptide proopiomelanocortin (POMC).

N-POMC is also a precursor for γ1-MSH, γ2-MSH, and γ3-MSH, and can form them through proteolytic cleavage.

N-POMC is an adrenal growth factor.

== See also ==
- Proopiomelanocortin (POMC)
