= Central melanocortin system =

System involved in the regulation of weight and peripheral tissue such as hair and skin

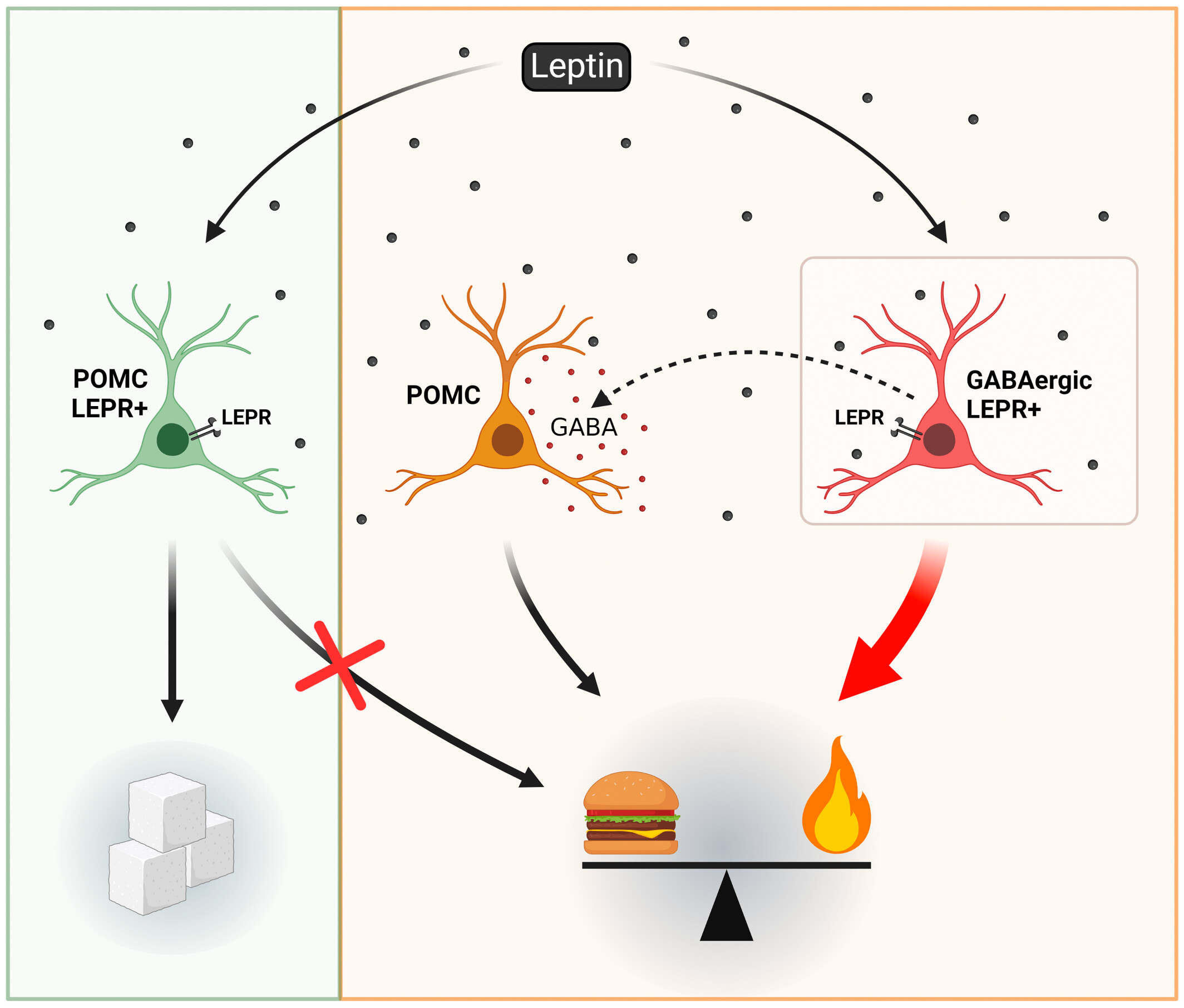
Updated leptin–melanocortin model

The central melanocortin system is defined anatomically as a collection of central nervous system circuits which include:

- Neurons that express hypothalamic neuropeptide Y and agouti gene-related protein or proopiomelanocortin (POMC) and that originate in the arcuate nucleus.
- Brainstem POMC neurons originating in the commissural nucleus of the solitary tract (cNTS).
- Downstream targets of these proopiomelanocortic and agouti related protein neurons expressing the melanocortin-3 and melanocortin-4 receptors

== Mechanism of action ==
The melanocortin system is a critical regulator of energy balance, in both feeding behaviors and energy expenditure, as well as peripheral tissues such as skin and hair. This system is a principal nexus of body weight regulation through its role in appetite and energy expenditure via leptin, ghrelin and agouti-related protein. It receives inputs from hormones, nutrients and afferent neural inputs, and is unique in its composition of fibers which express both agonists and antagonists of melanocortin receptors. Much of what is known about brain control's of overall energy balance and fat storage stem from the discoveries about the hypothalamic melanocortin system and leptin.

Research into appetite-suppressants have further highlighted the role of the melanocortin system in weight homeostasis. Nicotine's appetite-suppressant effect appears to result from nicotine's stimulation of α3β4 nAChR receptors located in the POMC neurons in the arcuate nucleus and subsequently the melanocortin system via the melanocortin-4 receptors on second-order neurons in the paraventricular nucleus of the hypothalamus. Serotonin plays an essential role in mediating energy balance, including appetite suppression and weight reduction, by stimulation of the melanocortin-4 receptors, as was previously hypothesized, by a pathway to the brain stem via the hypothalamus, even though there are also peripheral pathways. Circadian rhythm signals also affect the melanocortin system, both directly with melatonin affecting POMC gene expression in the arcuate nucleas, and indirectly via the interdependence between serotonin and melatonin cycles. Selenoproteins indirectly regulate the melatocortin system via redox homeostasis.

== Therapeutic implications ==
Due to the essential role of melanocortins in the regulation of body weight and appetite, they are a target of choice for anti-obesity drugs development, such as setmelanotide and lorcaserin, but also diabetes, cachexia and eating disorders such as anorexia. Other drugs target the serotonergic system to indirectly affect the melanocortin system for the treatment of obesity. This system also elicits effects on cardiovascular and sexual function.

Stimulation of the melanocortin-4 receptor causes a decrease in appetite and an increase in metabolism of fat and lean body mass, even in a relatively starved state. Conversely, damage to this receptor has been shown to result in morbid obesity, and is the most commonly known cause of monogenic morbid obesity. Mutation in an allele of the melanocortin-4 receptor causes 2-3% of childhood and adult obesity. Deficiencies and mutations in the melanocortin-4 receptors were also identified in the general population, thus rendering obsolete the distinction between rare monogenic obesity and common polygenic obesity.

== Additional bibliography ==
- Cone (2005) Anatomy and Regulation of the Central Melanocortin System Nature Neuroscience 7: 1048-54
- Daniel L. Marks, Nicholas Ling and Roger D. Cone (2001) Role of the Central Melanocortin System in Cachexia Cancer Research 61, 1432- 1438
- Joyce J. Hwa, Lorraine Ghibaudi, Jun Gao, and Eric M. Parker (2001) Central melanocortin system modulates energy intake and expenditure of obese and lean Zucker rats AJP-Regulatory, Integrative and Comparative Physiology Vol. 281, Issue 2, R444-R451
