= Cushing's disease =

- Other names: Cushing disease, tertiary or secondary hypercortisolism, tertiary or secondary hypercorticism, Itsenko-Cushing disease
- Specialty: Endocrinology
- Frequency: 0.005%

Cushing's disease is one cause of Cushing's syndrome characterised by increased secretion of adrenocorticotropic hormone (ACTH) from the anterior pituitary (secondary hypercortisolism). This is most often as a result of a pituitary adenoma (specifically pituitary basophilism) or due to excess production of hypothalamus CRH (corticotropin releasing hormone) (tertiary hypercortisolism/hypercorticism) that stimulates the synthesis of cortisol by the adrenal glands. Pituitary adenomas are responsible for 80% of endogenous Cushing's syndrome, when excluding Cushing's syndrome from exogenously administered corticosteroids. The equine version of this disease is pituitary pars intermedia dysfunction.

This should not be confused with ectopic Cushing syndrome or exogenous steroid use.

== Signs and symptoms ==
The symptoms of Cushing's disease are similar to those seen in other causes of Cushing's syndrome. Patients with Cushing's disease usually present with one or more signs and symptoms secondary to the presence of excess cortisol or ACTH. Although uncommon, some patients with Cushing's disease have large pituitary tumors (macroadenomas). In addition to the severe hormonal effects related to increased blood cortisol levels, the large tumor can compress adjacent structures. These tumors can compress the nerves that carry information from the eyes, causing a decrease in peripheral vision. Glaucoma and cataracts also may occur in Cushing's syndrome. In children, the two main symptoms are obesity and decreased linear growth.

The clinical diagnosis must be based on the presence of one or more of the symptoms listed below because the syndrome itself has no true pathognomonic signs or symptoms. The most common symptoms seen in male patients are purple striae, muscle atrophy, osteoporosis, and kidney stones.

=== Common ===
Common signs and symptoms of Cushing's disease include the following:

- weight gain
- high blood pressure
- poor short-term memory
- irritability
- excess hair growth (women)
- Impaired immunological function
- red, ruddy face
- extra fat around neck, "Buffalo Hump"
- moon face
- fatigue
- red stretch marks
- poor concentration
- irregular menstruation

=== Less common ===
The less-common signs and symptoms of Cushing's disease include the following:

- insomnia
- recurrent infection
- thin skin and stretch marks
- easy bruising
- weak bones
- acne
- balding (women)
- depression
- hip and shoulder weakness
- swelling of feet/legs
- diabetes mellitus
- erectile dysfunction

== Diagnosis ==
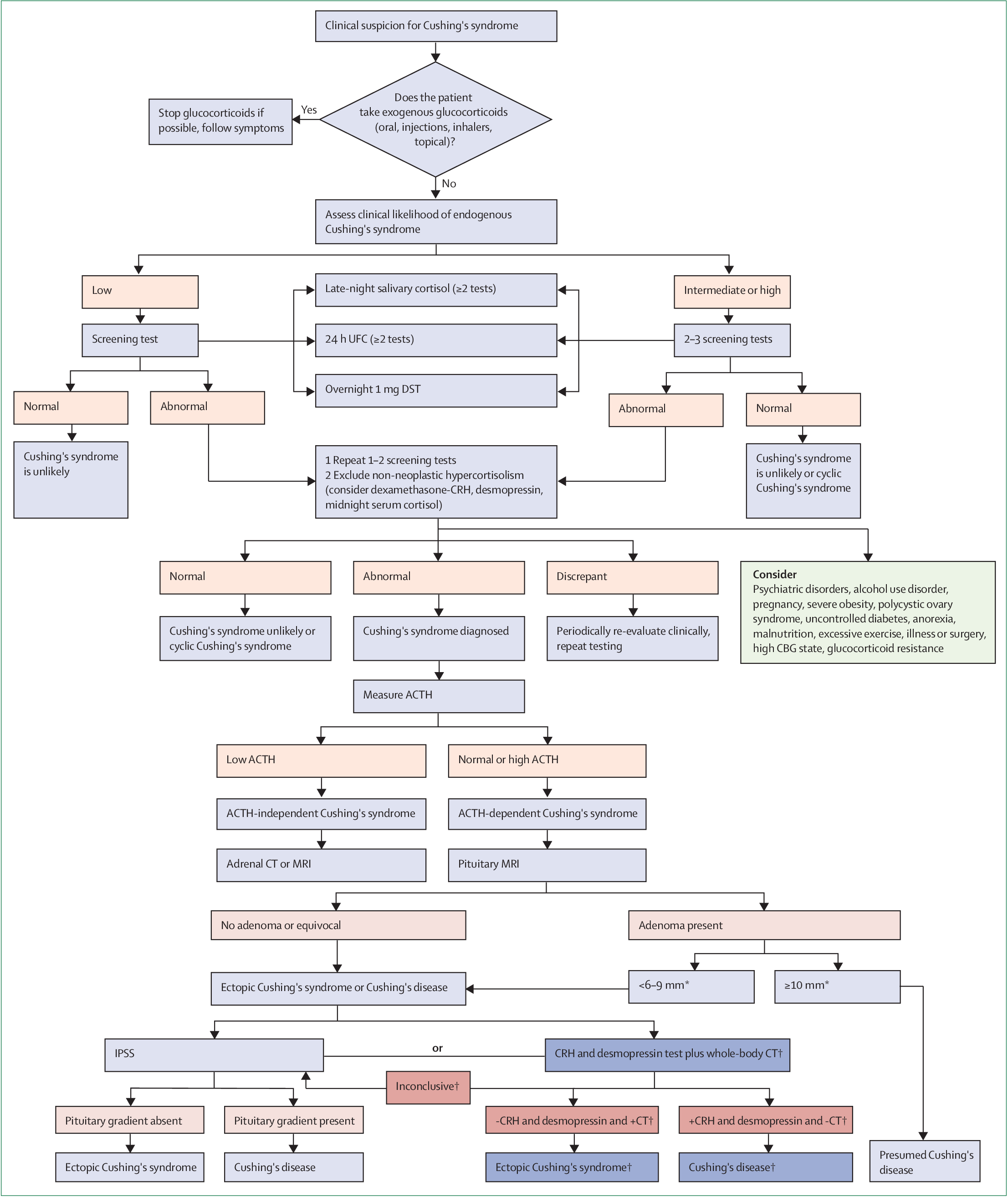
Diagnostic algorithm of suspected Cushing's syndrome: ACTH=adrenocorticotropic hormone. CBG=corticosteroid-binding globulin CRH=corticotropin-releasing hormone DST=dexamethasone suppression test. IPSS=inferior petrosal sinus sampling UFC=urinary free cortisol. *There is consensus that all patients with lesions smaller than 6 mm in diameter should have IPSS and those with lesions of ≥10 mm do not need IPSS, but expert opinions differed for lesions 6–9 mm in diameter †This alternative option does not have clear consensus and needs further research, and this is indicated by darker boxes. Green boxes indicate points to consider Darker colors indicate less validated testing pathways.

Diagnosis is made first by diagnosing Cushing's syndrome (hypercortisolism), which can be difficult to do clinically since the most characteristic symptoms only occur in a minority of patients. Some of the biochemical diagnostic tests used include salivary and blood serum cortisol testing, 24-hour urinary free cortisol (UFC) testing, the dexamethasone suppression test (DST). No single test is perfect and multiple tests should always be used to achieve a proper diagnosis. Diagnosing Cushing's disease is a multidisciplinary process involving doctors, endocrinologists, radiologists, surgeons, and chemical pathologists. Often, it is hard to differentiate true Cushing's from pseudo-Cushing's (non-neoplastic hypercortisolism).

=== ACTH blood test ===
Once Cushing's syndrome has been diagnosed, the first step towards finding the cause is measuring plasma adrenocorticotropic hormone (ACTH) concentration. A concentration consistently below 1.1 pmol/L is classified as corticotropin-independent and does not lead to a diagnosis of Cushing's disease. In such cases, the next step is adrenal imaging with CT. If plasma corticotropin concentrations are consistently above 3.3 pmol/L, then corticotropin-dependent Cushing's syndrome is most likely. Any intermediate values need to be cautiously interpreted and a corticotropin-releasing hormone (CRH) test is advised in order to confirm corticotropin dependency. If corticotropin-dependent Cushing's syndrome is determined then the next step is to distinguish between Cushing's disease and ectopic corticotropin syndrome. This is done via a combination of techniques including CRH, high-dose DST, pituitary MRI and bilateral inferior petrosal sinus sampling (IPSS).

=== Dexamethasone suppression test ===
Two dexamethasone suppression tests (DSTs) are generally used, the overnight test and the 48 hour test. For both tests, a plasma cortisol level above 50 nmol/L is indicative of Cushing's disease. However, 3–8% of patients with Cushing's disease will test negative due to a retention of dexamethasone suppression abilities. For non-Cushing or healthy patients, the false-positive rate is 30%. The 48-h DST is advantageous since it is more specific and can be done by outpatients upon proper instruction. In the high-dose 48-h DST, 2 mg of dexamethasone is given every 6 hours for 48 hours or a single dose of 8 mg is given. This test is not needed if the 48-h low-dose DST has shown suppression of cortisol by over 30%. These tests are based on the glucocorticoid sensitivity of pituitary adenomas compared to non-pituitary tumors.

=== ACTH stimulation test ===
An ACTH stimulation test involving administration of corticotropin-releasing hormone (CRH) or another agent can differentiate this condition from ectopic ACTH secretion. In a patient with Cushing's disease, the tumor cells will be stimulated to release corticotropin and elevated plasma corticotropin levels will be detected. This rarely occurs with ectopic corticotropin syndrome and thus is quite useful for distinguishing between the two conditions. If ectopic, the plasma ACTH and cortisol levels should remain unchanged; if this is pituitary related, levels of both would rise. The CRH test uses recombinant human or bovine-sequence CRH, which is administered via a 100μg intravenous bolus dose. The sensitivity of the CRH test for detecting Cushing's disease is 93% when plasma levels are measured after fifteen and thirty minutes. However, this test is used only as a last resort due to its high cost and complexity.

=== Imaging ===
A CT or MRI of the pituitary may also show the ACTH-secreting tumor if present. However, in 40% of Cushing's disease patients MRI is unable to detect a tumor. In one study of 261 patients with confirmed pituitary Cushing's disease, only 48% of pituitary lesions were identified using MRI prior to surgery. The average size of tumor, both those that were identified on MRI and those that were only discovered during surgery, was 6 mm.

=== Inferior petrosal sinus sampling ===
IPSS (inferior petrosal sinus sampling) or BIPSS (bilateral IPSS) is a more accurate but invasive test used to differentiate pituitary from ectopic or adrenal Cushing's syndrome. A corticotropin gradient sample via BIPSS is required to confirm diagnosis when pituitary MRI imaging and biochemical diagnostic tests have been inconclusive. A basal central:peripheral ratio of over 2:1, or a ratio over 3:1 when CRH is administered, is indicative of Cushing's disease. This test has been the gold standard for distinguishing between Cushing's disease and ectopic corticotropin syndrome, with a sensitivity and specificity of 94% for Cushing's disease, and a very low rate of complications.

=== Urinary free cortisol test ===
Another diagnostic test used is the urinary free cortisol (UFC) test, which measures the excess cortisol excreted by the kidneys into the urine. Results of 4x higher cortisol levels than normal are likely to be Cushing's disease. This test should be repeated three times in order to exclude any normally occurring periods of hypercortisolism. The UFC test has a specificity of 81% and thus has a high rate of false-positives that are due to pseudo-Cushing states, sleep apnea, polyendocrine metabolic ovarian syndrome (PMOS), familial glucocorticoid resistance, and hyperthyroidism.

=== Late night (midnight) salivary cortisol test ===
The late-night or midnight salivary cortisol test has been gaining support due to its ease of collection and stability at room temperature, therefore it can be assigned to outpatients. The test measures free circulating cortisol and have both a sensitivity and specificity of 95–98%. This test is especially useful for diagnosing children.

== Treatment ==
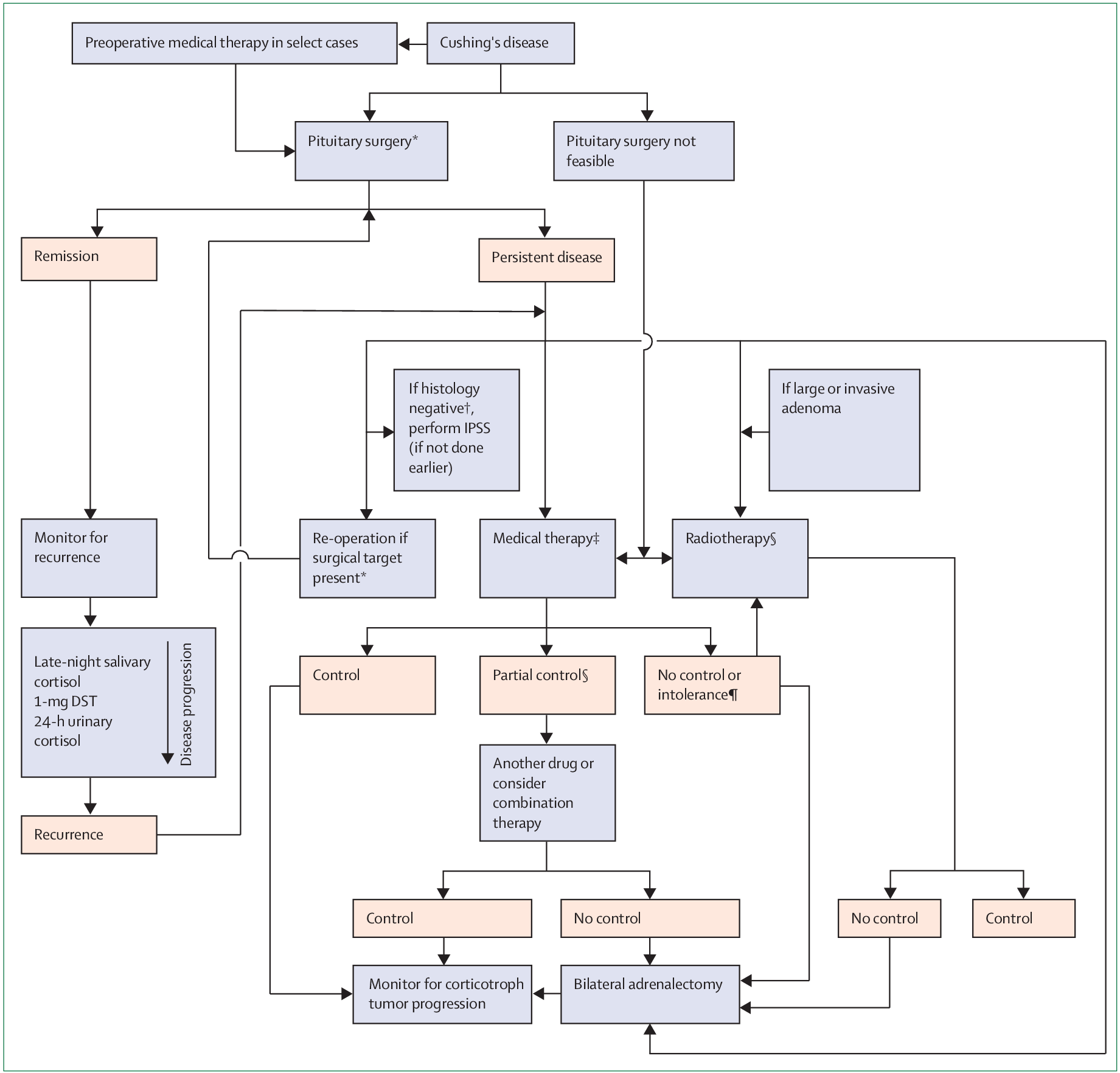
Management algorithm of Cushing's disease: DST=dexamethasone suppression test. IPSS=inferior petrosal sinus sampling. ACTH=adrenocorticotropic hormone. *Pituitary surgery should be performed by an experienced surgeon. †Absence of ACTH-staining adenoma. ‡See table 2 and panel 3 for considerations regarding selection of medical therapy. §Lifelong monitoring for hypopituitarism and secondary neoplasia in the radiation field required. ¶On maximum tolerated dose of the drug.

The first-line treatment of Cushing's disease is surgical resection of ACTH-secreting pituitary adenoma; this surgery involves removal of the tumor via transsphenoidal surgery (TSS). There are two possible options for access to the sphenoidal sinus, including of endonasal approach (through the nostril) or sublabial approach (through an incision under the upper lip); many factors such as the size of nostril, the size of the lesion, and the preferences of the surgeon cause the selection of one access route over the other. Some tumors do not contain a discrete border between the tumor and pituitary gland; therefore, careful sectioning through the pituitary gland may be required to identify the location of the tumor. The probability of successful resection is higher in patients where the tumor was identified at initial surgery in comparison to patients where no tumor was found initially; the overall remission rates in patients with microadenomas undergoing TSS are in range of 65%–90%, and the remission rate in patients with macroadenomas are lower than 65%. Patients with persistent disease after initial surgery are treated with repeated pituitary surgery as soon as the active persistent disease is evident; however, reoperation has a lower success rate and increases the risk of pituitary insufficiency.

Pituitary radiation therapy is another option for treatment of postoperative persisting hypercortisolemia following unsuccessful transsphenoidal surgery. External-beam pituitary RT is more effective treatment for pediatric CD in children with cure rates of 80–88%. Hypopituitarism specifically growth hormone deficiency has been reported as the only most common late morbidity of this treatment; GHD has been reported in 36% and 68% of the patients undergoing post-pituitary RT for Cushing's disease.

Bilateral adrenalectomy is another treatment that provides immediate reduction of cortisol level and control of hypercortisolism. However, it requires education of patients, because lifelong glucocorticoid and mineralocorticoid replacement therapy is needed for these patients. One of the major complications of this treatment is progression of Nelson's syndrome which is caused by enhance level of tumor growth and ACTH secretion post adrenalectomy in 8–29% of patients with CD.

During post-surgical recovery, patients collect a 24-hour urine sample and blood sample for detecting the level of cortisol with the purpose of cure test; level of cortisol near the detection limit assay corresponds to cure. Hormonal replacement such as steroid is given to patients because of steroid withdrawal. After the completion of collecting urine and blood samples, patients are asked to switch to glucocorticoid such as prednisone to decrease symptoms associated with adrenal withdrawal. Mitotane is also used

A study of 3,525 cases of TSS for Cushing's disease in the nationally representative sample of US hospitals between 1993 and 2002 was conducted and revealed the following results: the in-hospital mortality rate was 0.7%; the complication rate was 42.1%. Diabetes insipidus (15%), fluid and electrolyte abnormalities (12.5%), and neurological deficits (5.6%) were the most common complications reported. The analyses of the study show that complications were more likely in patients with pre-operative comorbidities. Patients older than 64 years were more likely to have an adverse outcome and prolonged hospital stay. Women were 0.3 times less likely to have adverse outcomes in comparison to men.

== Epidemiology ==
Cases of Cushing's disease are rare, and little epidemiological data is available on the disease. An 18-year study conducted on the population of Vizcaya, Spain, reported a 0.004% prevalence of Cushing's disease. The average incidence of newly diagnosed cases was 2.4 cases per million inhabitants per year. The disease is often diagnosed 3–6 years after the onset of illness. Several studies have shown that Cushing's disease is more prevalent in women than men at a ratio of 3–6:1, respectively. Moreover, most women affected were between the ages of 50 and 60 years. The prevalence of hypertension, and abnormalities in glucose metabolism are major predictors of mortality and morbidity in untreated cases of the disease. The mortality rate of Cushing's disease was reported to be 10–11%, with the majority of deaths due to vascular disease. Women aged 45–70 years have a significantly higher mortality rate than men. Moreover, the disease shows a progressive increase with time. Reasons for the trend are unknown, but better diagnostic tools and a higher incidence rate are two possible explanations.

== History ==
The disease associated with this increased secretion of cortisol was described by the American neurosurgeon Harvey Cushing in 1912 after he was presented with a unique case of the disease in 1910 a 23-year-old woman called Minnie G. whose symptoms included painful obesity, amenorrhea, hypertrichosis (abnormal hair growth), underdevelopment of secondary sexual characteristics, hydrocephalus and cerebral tension. This combination of symptoms was not yet described by any medical disorder at the time. However, Cushing was confident that Minnie's symptoms were due to dysfunction of the pituitary gland and resembled those associated with an adrenal tumor. Given this conviction, and his knowledge of the three anterior pituitary cell types, Cushing hypothesized that if acidophil hyperpituitarism (excess secretion from the acidophil cells) caused acromegaly, then an excess of basophil cells must be involved in another pituitary disorder that involves sexual dysfunction (amenorrhea in females and erectile dysfunction in males) and could explain Minnie's symptoms. Experimental evidence and case reports by Cushing led to his publication in 1932 on pituitary basophilism as the cause of Cushing's disease. In this publication, the clinical symptoms of the disease, named after Cushing, were described. Out of the 12 cases with hypercortisolism described in Cushing's monograph on the pituitary body, 67% died within a few years after symptom presentation, whereas Minnie G. survived for more than 40 years after symptom presentation, despite the fact that she did not receive any treatments for a pituitary tumor. The prolonged survival made Minnie's case unique at the time. The reason behind this survival remains a mystery since an autopsy of Minnie was refused after her death. However, the most likely explanation, proposed by J. Aidan Carney and based on statistical evidence, was that the basophil adenoma Minnie might have harbored underwent partial infarction, leading to symptom regression. The other hypothesis was that Minnie might have had Primary Pigmented Nodular Adrenocortical Disease (PPNAD), which when associated with Cushing's syndrome (Carney complex) can infrequently cause spontaneous symptom regression of the latter.

In 1924, the Soviet neurologist Nikolai Itsenko reported two patients with pituitary adenoma. The resulting excessive adrenocorticotropic hormone secretion led to the production of large amounts of cortisol by the adrenal glands. Considering this impact, the name of Itsenko was added to the title in some East European and Asian countries, and the disease is called Itsenko-Kushing disease.
