= Flumedroxone acetate =

Chemical compound

Clinical data
- Trade names: Demigran, Leomigran
- Other names: WG-537; 6α-(Trifluoromethyl)-17α-acetoxyprogesterone; 6α-(Trifluoromethyl)-17α-acetoxypregn-4-ene-3,20-dione
- Routes of administration: By mouth
- Drug class: Progestogen; Progestin; Progestogen ester
- ATC code: N02CB01 (WHO)

Identifiers
- IUPAC name: [(6S,8R,9S,10R,13S,14S,17R)-17-acetyl-10,13-dimethyl-3-oxo-6-(trifluoromethyl)-2,6,7,8,9,11,12,14,15,16-decahydro-1H-cyclopenta[a]phenanthren-17-yl] acetate
- CAS Number: 987-18-8
- PubChem CID: 192154
- ChemSpider: 166814
- UNII: S0S93EK936
- CompTox Dashboard (EPA): DTXSID701024795
- ECHA InfoCard: 100.012.343

Chemical and physical data
- Formula: C_{24}H_{31}F_{3}O_{4}
- Molar mass: 440.503 g·mol^{−1}
- 3D model (JSmol): Interactive image
- SMILES: CC(=O)[C@]1(CC[C@@H]2[C@@]1(CC[C@H]3[C@H]2C[C@@H](C4=CC(=O)CC[C@]34C)C(F)(F)F)C)OC(=O)C
- InChI: InChI=1S/C24H31F3O4/c1-13(28)23(31-14(2)29)10-7-18-16-12-20(24(25,26)27)19-11-15(30)5-8-21(19,3)17(16)6-9-22(18,23)4/h11,16-18,20H,5-10,12H2,1-4H3/t16-,17+,18+,20+,21-,22+,23+/m1/s1; Key:MXZYUFNILISKBC-WXLIAARGSA-N

Flumedroxone acetate, sold under the brand names Demigran and Leomigran, is a progestin medication which is or has been used as an antimigraine agent. It is taken by mouth.

== Medical uses ==
Flumedroxone acetate has been assessed in over 1,000 patients for the treatment of migraine, with effectiveness ranging from excellent to less than that of the reference antimigraine drug methysergide. Other progestogens including medroxyprogesterone acetate, lynestrenol, allylestrenol, dydrogesterone, and normethandrone have also been found to be effective for migraine in a high percentage of women.

== Side effects ==
In accordance with its progestogenic activity, flumedroxone acetate produces menstrual irregularities, namely polymenorrhea, and breast tension as side effects in women.

== Pharmacology ==
=== Pharmacodynamics ===
Flumedroxone acetate is said to have weak or slight progestogenic activity without other hormonal activity, including no estrogenic, antiestrogenic, androgenic, anabolic, or glucocorticoid activity.

== Chemistry ==
Flumedroxone acetate, also known as 6α-(trifluoromethyl)-17α-acetoxyprogesterone or as 6α-(trifluoromethyl)-17α-acetoxypregn-4-ene-3,20-dione, is a synthetic pregnane steroid and a derivative of progesterone and 17α-hydroxyprogesterone. It is specifically a derivative of 17α-hydroxyprogesterone with a trifluoromethyl group at the C6α position and an acetate ester attached to the C17α hydroxyl group. The medication is the C17α acetate ester of flumedroxone (6α-(trifluoromethyl)-17α-hydroxyprogesterone) and the C6α trifluoromethyl derivative of hydroxyprogesterone acetate (17α-acetoxyprogesterone).

== History ==
Flumedroxone acetate was introduced for medical use in the 1960s.

== Society and culture ==
=== Generic names ===
Flumedroxone is the INN and BAN of the free alcohol form of the drug, flumedroxone. Flumedroxone acetate is also known by its developmental code name WG-537.

=== Brand names ===
Flumedroxone acetate is or has been marketed under the brand names Demigran and Leomigran.

=== Availability ===
Flumedroxone acetate is or has been marketed in Europe.

== See also ==
- Fluorometholone acetate
- Mometasone furoate
