= David Landsborough Thomson =

Canadian biochemist

David Landsborough Thomson F.R.S.C., (1901–1964) was a Canadian biochemist, best known for the co-discovery of Adrenocorticotropic hormone (adreno-cortical thyroid hormone or ACTH) and as the vice-principal of McGill University. ACTH was co-discovered by Evelyn M. Anderson, James Collip and Thomson. In a paper published in 1933, they explained its function in the body.

Born in Scotland, Thomson earned BSc and MA degrees from the University of Aberdeen, then a PhD in biochemistry from Cambridge University under the eye of Nobel laureate Frederick Gowland Hopkins. After further studies in Europe, he moved to Montreal, joining the McGill faculty in 1928. At McGill, he was Gilman Cheney Professor of Biochemistry from 1937 to 1960, dean of the faculty of graduate studies and research from 1942 to 1963, and the vice-principal from 1955 to 1963. He served on the National Research Council of Canada, the Defence Research Board and the Scientific Research Bureau of Quebec. He received an honorary LL.D. in 1961 from the University of Saskatchewan.

Like all British subjects then living in Canada, he became a Canadian with the passage of the Canadian Citizenship Act 1946.

== Publications ==
Thomson published several highly cited papers in major journals, including The Lancet, BMJ, NATURE, CMAJ, and J. Physiol. Many of these were in collaboration with Collip, Hans Selye, or both. Topic areas included endocrinology (particularly antihormones), vitamins (he coined the term "Vitamin B complex" in a 1938 paper),

He is also a writer of several books, of which "The Life of the Cell" (1928), written at the age of 27, stands out for having been translated into several languages.
