= Plethora (medicine) =

Ancient medical sign

Plethora is an ancient medical sign describing an excess of body fluid. The excessive fluid is usually blood, and can be a sign of a number of conditions with different causes. An excess of blood may be either an excessive blood flow to an area of the body, or an increase in the volume of blood (polycythemia). Extra perfusion to the face is termed facial plethora, a hallmark sign of Cushing's syndrome. Pulmonary plethora is an increased pulmonary perfusion seen on chest X-rays. A plethora of fluid in the pericardial cavity is known as pericardial effusion.

== Types ==
Plethora includes types of facial plethora, pulmonary plethora, and plethora of the neonate.

=== Facial plethora ===
Facial plethora is an excessive blood flow to the face and is a hallmark sign of Cushing's syndrome. The blood flow is to the superficial capillaries of the skin. The increased blood flow causes swelling of the facial tissue giving the appearance of a rounded moon face made red by the increased capillary blood flow.

Facial plethora may be a sign of Cushing's syndrome, superior vena cava syndrome, carcinoid syndrome, polycythemia vera, and rosacea. In superior vena cava syndrome compression of the vein causes upper body swelling that can lead to facial plethora.

=== Pulmonary plethora ===
Pulmonary plethora is an increased pulmonary perfusion seen on chest X-rays.

=== Pericardial cavity ===
A plethora of fluid in the pericardial cavity is known as pericardial effusion.

=== Plethora of the neonate ===
Plethora in the newborn, also known as polycythemia of neonates, is an increase in the blood volume due in large part to the late clamping of the umbilical cord. This can cause transient tachypnea of the newborn a temporary breathing problem.
