= Corticotropin-like intermediate peptide =

pro-opiomelanocortin

Identifiers
- Symbol: POMC
- NCBI gene: 5443
- HGNC: 9201
- OMIM: 176830
- RefSeq: NM_000939
- UniProt: P01189

Other data
- Locus: Chr. 2 p23
Search for
- Structures: Swiss-model
- Domains: InterPro

Corticotropin-like intermediate peptide

Names
- IUPAC name L-arginyl-L-prolyl-L-valyl-L-lysyl-L-valyl-L-tyrosyl-L-prolyl-L-asparaginyl-L-glycyl-L-alanyl-L-α-glutamyl-L-α-aspartyl-L-α-glutamyl-L-seryl-L-alanyl-L-α-glutamyl-L-alanyl-L-phenylalanyl-L-prolyl-L-leucyl-L-α-glutamyl-L-phenylalanine

Identifiers
CAS Number	53917-42-3
3D model (JSmol)	Interactive image
ChemSpider	14195066
PubChem CID	102307347
- InChI: InChI=1S/C112H165N27O36/c1-56(2)48-72(100(163)125-70(37-41-86(148)149)97(160)133-77(111(174)175)51-63-24-14-11-15-25-63)129-103(166)79-28-20-46-138(79)109(172)75(49-62-22-12-10-13-23-62)131-93(156)61(9)121-95(158)68(35-39-84(144)145)123-92(155)60(8)122-102(165)78(55-140)134-98(161)71(38-42-87(150)151)126-101(164)74(53-88(152)153)128-96(159)69(36-40-85(146)147)124-91(154)59(7)120-83(143)54-119-94(157)73(52-82(115)142)130-104(167)80-29-21-47-139(80)110(173)76(50-64-31-33-65(141)34-32-64)132-107(170)89(57(3)4)135-99(162)67(27-16-17-43-113)127-106(169)90(58(5)6)136-105(168)81-30-19-45-137(81)108(171)66(114)26-18-44-118-112(116)117/h10-15,22-25,31-34,56-61,66-81,89-90,140-141H,16-21,26-30,35-55,113-114H2,1-9H3,(H2,115,142)(H,119,157)(H,120,143)(H,121,158)(H,122,165)(H,123,155)(H,124,154)(H,125,163)(H,126,164)(H,127,169)(H,128,159)(H,129,166)(H,130,167)(H,131,156)(H,132,170)(H,133,160)(H,134,161)(H,135,162)(H,136,168)(H,144,145)(H,146,147)(H,148,149)(H,150,151)(H,152,153)(H,174,175)(H4,116,117,118)/t59-,60-,61-,66-,67-,68-,69-,70-,71-,72-,73-,74-,75-,76-,77-,78-,79-,80-,81-,89-,90-/m0/s1 Key: ZYDMZKPAPSZILB-WKNDHWIVSA-N; Key: ZYDMZKPAPSZILB-UHFFFAOYAN
- SMILES: C[C@@H](C(=N[C@@H](CCC(=O)O)C(=N[C@@H](CC(=O)O)C(=N[C@@H](CCC(=O)O)C(=N[C@@H](CO)C(=N[C@@H](C)C(=N[C@@H](CCC(=O)O)C(=N[C@@H](C)C(=N[C@@H](CC1=CC=CC=C1)C(=O)N2CCC[C@H]2C(=N[C@@H](CC(C)C)C(=N[C@@H](CCC(=O)O)C(=N[C@@H](CC3=CC=CC=C3)C(=O)O)O)O)O)O)O)O)O)O)O)O)O)N=C(CN=C([C@H](CC(=N)O)N=C([C@@H]4CCCN4C(=O)[C@H](CC5=CC=C(C=C5)O)N=C([C@H](C(C)C)N=C([C@H](CCCCN)N=C([C@H](C(C)C)N=C([C@@H]6CCCN6C(=O)[C@H](CCCNC(=N)N)N)O)O)O)O)O)O)O

Properties
Chemical formula	C_{112}H_{165}N_{27}O_{36}
Molar mass	2465.705 g·mol^{−1}
- Except where otherwise noted, data are given for materials in their standard state (at 25 °C [77 °F], 100 kPa). Infobox references

Corticotropin-like intermediate [lobe] peptide (CLIP), also known as adrenocorticotropic hormone fragment 18-39 (ACTH(18-39)), is a naturally occurring, endogenous neuropeptide with a docosapeptide structure and the amino acid sequence Arg-Pro-Val-Lys-Val-Tyr-Pro-Asn-Gly-Ala-Glu-Asp-Glu-Ser-Ala-Glu-Ala-Phe-Pro-Leu-Glu-Phe. CLIP is generated as a proteolyic cleavage product of adrenocorticotropic hormone (ACTH), which in turn is a cleavage product of proopiomelanocortin (POMC). Its physiological role has been investigated in various tissues, specifically in the central nervous system.

It has been suggested to function as an insulin secretagogue in the pancreas.
