= Proopiomelanocortin =

Mammalian protein found in Homo sapiens

POMC
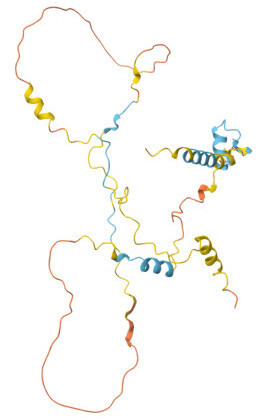

Identifiers
- Aliases: POMC, POC, proopiomelanocortin, OBAIRH, LPH, CLIP, ACTH, NPP, MSH
- External IDs: OMIM: 176830; MGI: 97742; GeneCards: POMC
Available structures
PDB	Ortholog search: PDBe RCSB
PDB	List of PDB id codes 2LWC, 5E33, 1PLW, 1PLX

Gene location (Human)
Chr.	Chromosome 2 (human)
Band	2p23.3	Start	25,160,853 bp
Band	2p23.3	End	25,168,903 bp

Gene location (Mouse)
Chr.	Chromosome 12 (mouse)
Band	12 A1.1|12 1.99 cM	Start	4,004,951 bp
Band	12 A1.1|12 1.99 cM	End	4,010,642 bp
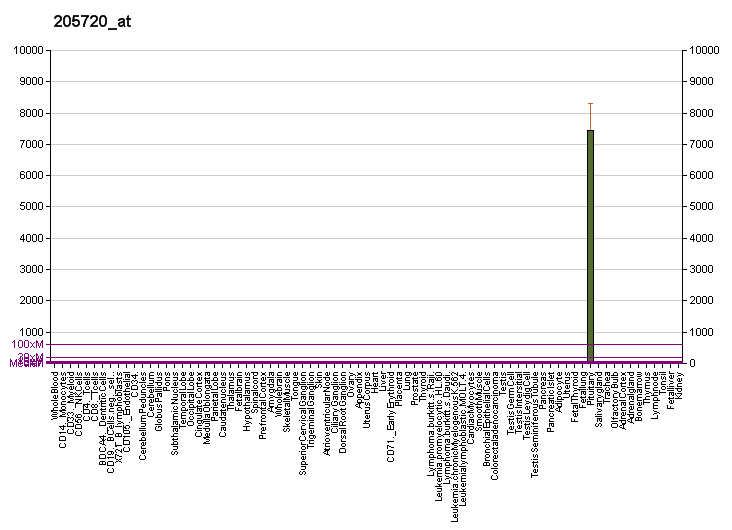
RNA expression pattern
Bgee	Human / Mouse (ortholog); Top expressed in: anterior pituitary; right testis; left testis; gonad; body of pancreas; right adrenal cortex; left adrenal gland; apex of heart; left adrenal cortex; right auricle of heart / Top expressed in: pituitary gland; arcuate nucleus; median eminence; pars distalis of adenohypophysis; pars intermedia; ventromedial nucleus; suprachiasmatic nucleus; trophoblast giant cell; seminiferous tubule; otic vesicle; More reference expression data
BioGPS	More reference expression data
Gene ontology
Molecular function	type 3 melanocortin receptor binding; hormone activity; type 1 melanocortin receptor binding; signaling receptor binding; G protein-coupled receptor binding; type 4 melanocortin receptor binding; neuropeptide hormone activity
Cellular component	cytoplasm; peroxisome; extracellular region; peroxisomal matrix; secretory granule lumen; extracellular space; secretory granule
Biological process	glucose homeostasis; cellular pigmentation; cell-cell signaling; generation of precursor metabolites and energy; regulation of glycogen metabolic process; regulation of blood pressure; negative regulation of tumor necrosis factor production; regulation of appetite; signal transduction; positive regulation of transcription by RNA polymerase II; neuropeptide signaling pathway; positive regulation of neutrophil mediated killing of fungus; regulation of corticosterone secretion; regulation of signaling receptor activity; G protein-coupled receptor signaling pathway; cytokine-mediated signaling pathway
Sources:Amigo / QuickGO
Orthologs
Databases	NCBI: entry; OMA: entry
Species	Human	Mouse
Entrez	5443	18976
Ensembl	ENSG00000115138	ENSMUSG00000020660
UniProt	P01189	P01193
RefSeq (mRNA)	NM_000939; NM_001035256; NM_001319204; NM_001319205	NM_008895; NM_001278581; NM_001278582; NM_001278583; NM_001278584
RefSeq (protein)	NP_000930; NP_001030333; NP_001306133; NP_001306134	NP_001265510; NP_001265511; NP_001265512; NP_001265513; NP_032921
Location (UCSC)	Chr 2: 25.16 – 25.17 Mb	Chr 12: 4 – 4.01 Mb
PubMed search
- Wikidata
View/Edit Human	View/Edit Mouse

Opioids neuropeptide

Identifiers
- Symbol: Op_neuropeptide
- Pfam: PF08035
- InterPro: IPR013532
- PROSITE: PDOC00964
Available protein structures:
- PDB: IPR013532 PF08035 (ECOD; PDBsum)
- AlphaFold: IPR013532; PF08035

Pro-opiomelanocortin (POMC) is a precursor polypeptide with 241 amino acid residues. POMC is synthesized in corticotrophs of the anterior pituitary from the 267-amino-acid-long polypeptide precursor pre-pro-opiomelanocortin (pre-POMC), by the removal of a 26-amino-acid-long signal peptide sequence during translation. POMC is part of the central melanocortin system.

== Gene ==
The POMC gene is located on chromosome 2p23.3. This gene encodes a 285-amino acid polypeptide hormone precursor that undergoes extensive, tissue-specific, post-translational processing via cleavage by subtilisin-like enzymes known as prohormone convertases.

== Tissue distribution ==
The POMC gene is expressed in both the anterior and intermediate lobes of the pituitary gland. Its protein product is primarily synthesized by corticotropic cells in the anterior pituitary, but it is also produced in several other tissues:

- Corticotropic cells of the anterior pituitary gland
- Melanotropic cells of the intermediate lobe of the pituitary gland
- Neurons of the arcuate nucleus (infundibular nucleus) in the hypothalamus
- Smaller populations of neurons in the dorsomedial hypothalamus and brainstem
- Melanocytes in the skin.

== Function ==
POMC is cut (cleaved) to give rise to multiple peptide hormones. Each of these peptides is packaged in large dense-core vesicles that are released from the cells by exocytosis in response to appropriate stimulation:

- α-MSH produced by neurons in the ventromedial nucleus has important roles in the regulation of appetite (POMC neuron stimulation results in satiety.) and sexual behavior, while α-MSH secreted from the intermediate lobe of the pituitary regulates the movement of melanin produced from melanocytes in skin.
- ACTH is a peptide hormone that regulates the secretion of mainly glucocorticoids from the cells of the zona fasciculata of the adrenal cortex. ACTH can also regulate secretion of gonadocorticoids from the cells of the zona reticularis since they also express ACTH receptors.
- β-Endorphin and [Met]enkephalin are endogenous opioid peptides with widespread actions in the brain.

== Post-translational modifications ==
The POMC gene encodes a 285-amino acid polypeptide precursor that undergoes extensive, tissue-specific post-translational processing. This processing is primarily mediated by subtilisin-like prohormone convertases, which cleave the precursor at specific basic amino acid sequences—typically Arg-Lys, Lys-Arg, or Lys-Lys.

In many tissues, four primary cleavage sites are utilized, resulting in the production of two major bioactive peptides: adrenocorticotrophin (ACTH), which is essential for normal steroidogenesis and adrenal gland maintenance, and β-lipotropin. However, the POMC precursor contains at least eight potential cleavage sites, and depending on the tissue type and the specific convertases expressed, it can be processed into up to ten biologically active peptides with diverse functions.

Key processing enzymes include prohormone convertase 1 (PC1), prohormone convertase 2 (PC2), carboxypeptidase E (CPE), peptidyl α-amidating monooxygenase (PAM), N-acetyltransferase (N-AT), and prolylcarboxypeptidase (PRCP).

In addition to proteolytic cleavage, POMC processing involves other post-translational modifications such as glycosylation and acetylation. The specific pattern of cleavage and modification is tissue-dependent. For example, in the hypothalamus, placenta, and epithelium, all cleavage sites may be active, generating peptides involved in pain modulation, energy homeostasis, immune responses, and melanocyte stimulation. These peptides include multiple melanotropins, lipotropins, and endorphins, many of which are derived from the larger ACTH and β-lipotropin peptides.

=== Derivatives ===
proopiomelanocortin derivatives

POMC
γ-MSH	ACTH		β-lipotropin
	α-MSH	CLIP	γ-lipotropin	β-endorphin
			β-MSH

The large POMC precursor is the source of numerous biologically active peptides, which are produced through sequential enzymatic cleavage. These include:

N-Terminal Peptide of Proopiomelanocortin (NPP, or pro-γ-MSH) α-Melanotropin (α-Melanocyte-Stimulating Hormone, or α-MSH) β-Melanotropin (β-MSH) γ-Melanotropin (γ-MSH) 𝛿-Melanocyte-Stimulating Hormone (𝛿-MSH), found in sharks ε-Melanocyte-Stimulating Hormone (ε-MSH), present in some teleost fish Corticotropin (Adrenocorticotropic Hormone, or ACTH) Corticotropin-like Intermediate Peptide (CLIP) β-Lipotropin (β-LPH) Gamma Lipotropin (γ-LPH) β-Endorphin [Met]Enkephalin Although the first five amino acids of β-Endorphin are identical to [Met]enkephalin, β-Endorphin is not generally believed to be a precursor of [Met]enkephalin. Instead, [Met]enkephalin is produced independently from its own precursor, proenkephalin A.

The production of β-MSH occurs in humans, but not in mice or rats, due to the absence of the necessary cleavage site in the rodent POMC sequence.

== Regulation by the photoperiod ==
The levels of proopiomelanocortin (pomc) are regulated indirectly in some animals by the photoperiod. It is referred to the hours of light during a day and it changes across the seasons. Its regulation depends on the pathway of thyroid hormones that is regulated directly by the photoperiod. An example are the siberian hamsters who experience physiological seasonal changes dependent on the photoperiod. During spring in this species, when there is more than 13 hours of light per day, iodothyronine deiodinase 2 (DIO2) promotes the conversion of the prohormone thyroxine (T4) to the active hormone triiodothyronine (T3) through the removal of an iodine atom on the outer ring. It allows T3 to bind to the thyroid hormone receptor (TR), which then binds to thyroid hormone response elements (TREs) in the DNA sequence. The pomc proximal promoter sequence contains two thyroid-receptor 1b (Thrb) half-sites: TCC-TGG-TGA and TCA-CCT-GGA indicating that T3 may be capable of directly regulating pomc transcription. For this reason during spring and early summer, the level of pomc increases due to the increased level of T3.

However, during autumn and winter, when there is less than 13 hours of light per day, iodothyronine deiodinase 3 removes an iodine atom which converts thyroxine to the inactive reverse triiodothyronine (rT3), or which converts the active triiodothyronine to diiodothyronine (T2). Consequently, there is less T3 and it blocks the transcription of pomc, which reduces its levels during these seasons.

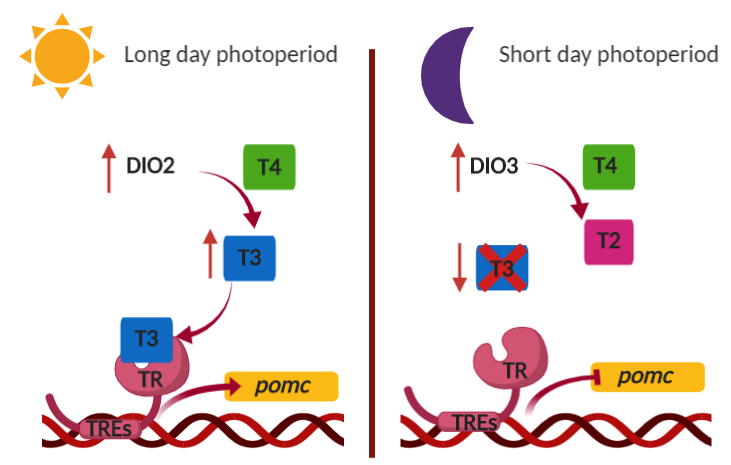
Regulation of proopiomelanocortin by the photoperiod and thyroid hormones

Influences of photoperiods on relevant similar biological endocrine changes that demonstrate modifications of thyroid hormone regulation in humans have yet to be adequately documented.

== Clinical significance ==
Mutations in the POMC gene have been associated with early-onset obesity, adrenal insufficiency, and red hair pigmentation.

In cases of primary adrenal insufficiency, decreased cortisol production leads to compensatory overproduction of pituitary ACTH through feedback mechanisms. Because ACTH is co-produced with α-MSH and γ-MSH from POMC, this overproduction can result in hyperpigmentation.

A specific genetic polymorphism in the POMC gene is associated with elevated fasting insulin levels, but only in obese individuals. The melanocortin signaling pathway may influence glucose metabolism in the context of obesity, indicating a possible gene–environment interaction. Thus, POMC variants may contribute to the development of polygenic obesity and help explain the connection between obesity and type 2 diabetes.

Increased circulating levels of POMC have also been observed in patients with sepsis. While the clinical implications of this finding are still under investigation, animal studies have shown that infusion of hydrocortisone in septic mice suppresses ACTH (a downstream product of POMC) without reducing POMC levels themselves.

=== Drug target ===
POMC is a pharmacological target for obesity treatment. The combination drug naltrexone/bupropion acts on hypothalamic POMC neurons to reduce appetite and food intake.

In rare cases of POMC deficiency, treatment with setmelanotide, a selective melanocortin-4 receptor agonist, has been effective. Two individuals with confirmed POMC deficiency showed clinical improvement following this therapy.

=== Dogs ===
A deletion mutation common in Labrador Retriever and Flat-coated Retriever dogs is associated with increased interest in food and subsequent obesity.

== Interactions ==
Proopiomelanocortin has been shown to interact with melanocortin 4 receptor. The endogenous agonists of melanocortin 4 receptor include α-MSH, β-MSH, γ-MSH, and ACTH. The fact that these are all cleavage products of POMC should suggest likely mechanisms of this interaction.

== See also ==
- Afamelanotide
- Agouti-related peptide
- Melanocortin
- Melanotan II
