= Lipotropin =

Peptide hormone in mammals

pro-opiomelanocortin

Identifiers
- Symbol: POMC
- NCBI gene: 5443
- HGNC: 9201
- OMIM: 176830
- RefSeq: NM_000939
- UniProt: P01189

Other data
- Locus: Chr. 2 p23
Search for
- Structures: Swiss-model
- Domains: InterPro

Lipotropin is the name for two hormones produced by the cleavage of pro-opiomelanocortin (POMC). The anterior pituitary gland produces the pro-hormone POMC, which is then cleaved again to form adrenocorticotropin (ACTH) and β-lipotropin (β-LPH).

== β-Lipotropin ==
β-Lipotropin is a 90-amino acid polypeptide that is the carboxy-terminal fragment of POMC. It was initially reported to stimulate melanocytes to produce melanin. It was also reported to perform lipid-mobilizing functions such as lipolysis and steroidogenesis. However, no subsequent studies have been published that support these early findings and no receptor has been identified for β-lipotropin.

β-Lipotropin can be cleaved into smaller peptides. In humans, γ-lipotropin, β-MSH, and β-endorphin, are all possible fragments of β-lipotropin. β-endorphin is the predominant opioid of the anterior human and rat pituitary gland. Birdsall and Hulme demonstrated that the C-fragment of lipotropin (β-endorphin) has a high affinity for opiate receptors in the brain, and the binding was reversed by naloxone, a classical antagonist of the opiates (Bradbury et al. 1976a). Alongside this, Feldberg found that β-endorphin administered in cat ventricles was 100 times more potent than morphine as an analgesic agent (Feldberg & Smyth 1976, 1977) and the analgesia persisted for several hours. Feldberg concluded that β-endorphin was the most potent analgesic agent known. β-Lipotropin is found in essentially equimolar concentrations to that of corticotropin. Evidence shows that β-Lipotropin is metabolized into endorphins that can greatly affect mood and behavior and is thus regarded as a prohormone.

== γ-Lipotropin ==
γ-lipotropin is the amino-terminal peptide fragment of β-lipotropin. In humans, it has 56 amino acids. Gamma lipotropin is identical to the first 56 amino acid sequences of β-lipotropin. It can be cleaved to β-melanocyte stimulating hormone.

In sheep, gamma-lipotropic hormone is a 58-amino-acid long pituitary polypeptide formed from the first 58 residues of beta-lipotropic hormone. The carboxyl-terminal of gamma-lipotropic hormone is identical to the structure of beta-melanophore-stimulating hormone.

== Use in pain relief ==
β-endorphin has been determined to have an analgesic effect. It produces effects similar to or characteristic of morphine.

== Use in sport ==
Lipotropin is on the Prohibited List of substances by the World Anti Doping Agency. Lipotropin has also, under its alternate name AOD-9604 (Anti-Obesity Drug-9604), been connected with controversies in Australian Rules Football. Allegations have arisen around the use of the drug and its administration to players of the Essendon Football Club in the Essendon Football Club supplements saga, including weekly administration to players in the 2012 season. The matters are currently under investigation due to the relationship between Lipotropin and growth hormones, as noted by club medical staff.

== Clinical trials ==
In 2020 AOD-9604 underwent clinical trials into its use for the treatment of pain.
