= Moon face =

- Other names: Moon facies, Cushingoid facies, Cushing's-like face
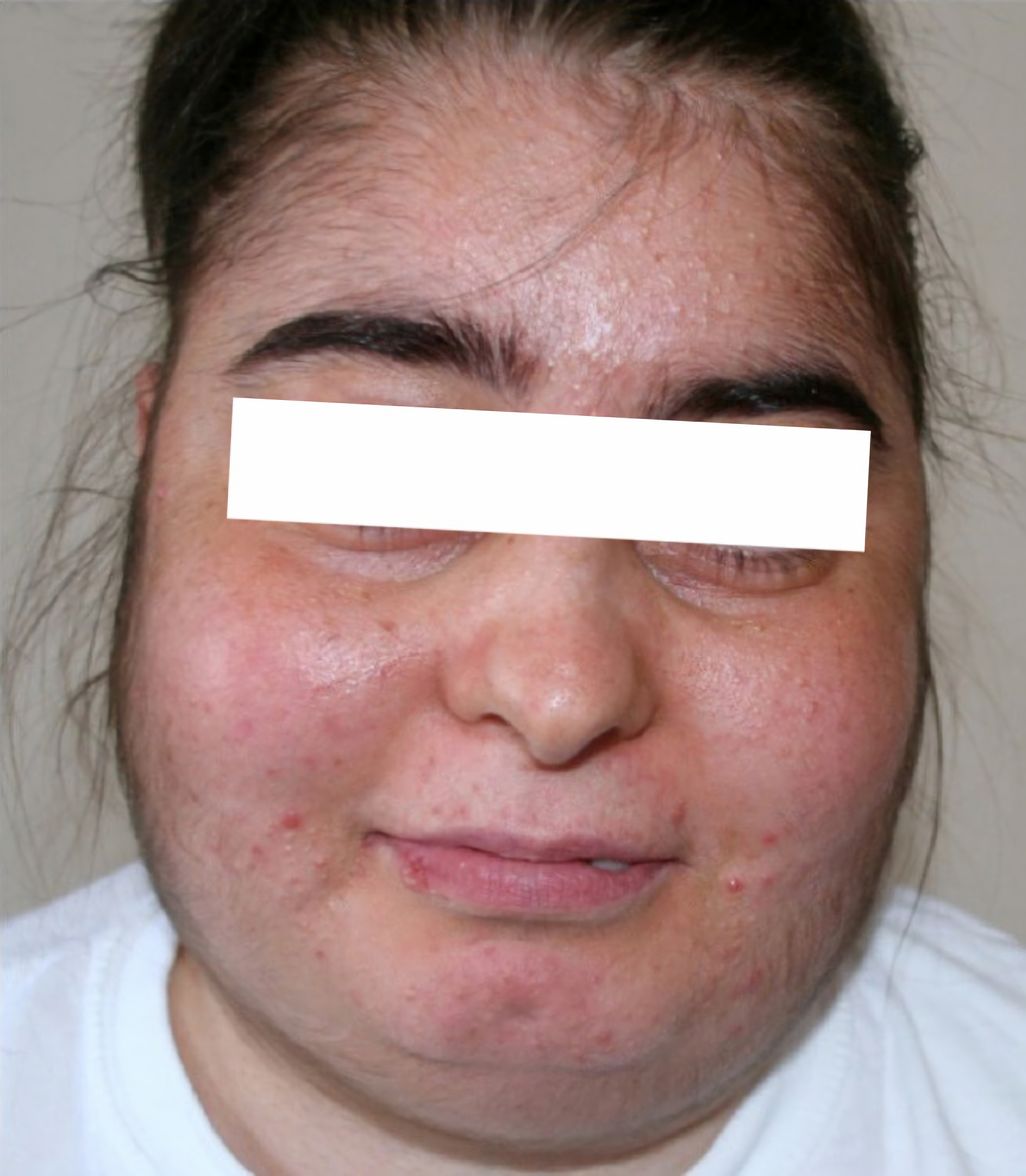
- Moon face resulting from steroid treatment.

A moon face is a medical sign in which the face develops a rounded appearance (reminiscent of the "Man in the Moon") due to fat deposits on the sides of the face.

== Symptoms and causes ==
Moon face is often associated with Cushing's syndrome or steroid treatment (especially corticosteroids), which has led to it being known as Cushingoid facies.

Moon face is a type of corticosteroid-induced lipodystrophy along with "buffalo hump", which in one study occurred in 47% of the 820 patients. Moon face is among the most frequently reported adverse events of systemic glucocorticoids, along with insomnia (58%), mood disturbances (50%), and hyperphagia (49%).

Another long-term study of 88 patients on prednisone showed that lipodystrophy, such as moon face, was the most frequent adverse event, experienced by 63% of patients.

== Incidence ==
The risk for moon face increases with higher doses and longer time on steroid treatment. One study showed an increased risk in women, those younger than 50 years of age, and those with a high initial BMI.

== Complications ==
This change in facial appearance can be very distressing to patients taking steroids. Later studies of the 88 patients showed that those who had lipodystrophy had a greater risk for metabolic syndrome characteristics such as increased blood pressure, higher plasma concentrations of fasting glucose, triglycerides, and total cholesterol, along with lower HDL-cholesterol.

== Treatment ==
Cessation of steroid therapy or treatment of the cause of Cushing's syndrome causes moon face to slowly decrease and eventually vanish. One study proposed that limiting calories could decrease the risk of corticosteroid-induced lipodystrophy.
