= Adrenocorticotropic hormone =

Pituitary hormone

POMC
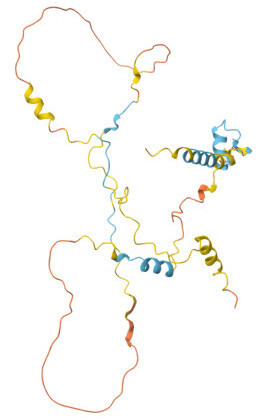

Identifiers
- Aliases: POMC, POC, proopiomelanocortin, OBAIRH, LPH, CLIP, ACTH, NPP, MSH
- External IDs: OMIM: 176830; MGI: 97742; GeneCards: POMC
Available structures
PDB	Ortholog search: PDBe RCSB
PDB	List of PDB id codes 2LWC, 5E33, 1PLW, 1PLX

Gene location (Human)
Chr.	Chromosome 2 (human)
Band	2p23.3	Start	25,160,853 bp
Band	2p23.3	End	25,168,903 bp

Gene location (Mouse)
Chr.	Chromosome 12 (mouse)
Band	12 A1.1|12 1.99 cM	Start	4,004,951 bp
Band	12 A1.1|12 1.99 cM	End	4,010,642 bp
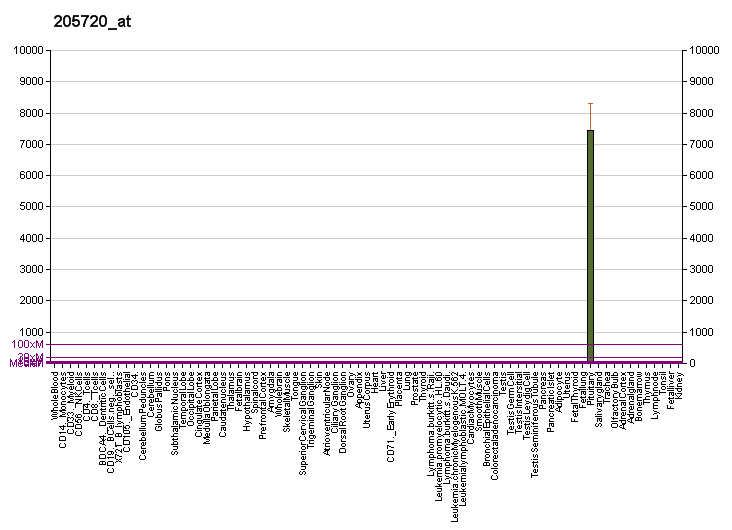
RNA expression pattern
Bgee	Human / Mouse (ortholog); Top expressed in: anterior pituitary; right testis; left testis; gonad; body of pancreas; right adrenal cortex; left adrenal gland; apex of heart; left adrenal cortex; right auricle of heart / Top expressed in: pituitary gland; arcuate nucleus; median eminence; pars distalis of adenohypophysis; pars intermedia; ventromedial nucleus; suprachiasmatic nucleus; trophoblast giant cell; seminiferous tubule; otic vesicle; More reference expression data
BioGPS	More reference expression data
Gene ontology
Molecular function	type 3 melanocortin receptor binding; hormone activity; type 1 melanocortin receptor binding; signaling receptor binding; G protein-coupled receptor binding; type 4 melanocortin receptor binding; neuropeptide hormone activity
Cellular component	cytoplasm; peroxisome; extracellular region; peroxisomal matrix; secretory granule lumen; extracellular space; secretory granule
Biological process	glucose homeostasis; cellular pigmentation; cell-cell signaling; generation of precursor metabolites and energy; regulation of glycogen metabolic process; regulation of blood pressure; negative regulation of tumor necrosis factor production; regulation of appetite; signal transduction; positive regulation of transcription by RNA polymerase II; neuropeptide signaling pathway; positive regulation of neutrophil mediated killing of fungus; regulation of corticosterone secretion; regulation of signaling receptor activity; G protein-coupled receptor signaling pathway; cytokine-mediated signaling pathway
Sources:Amigo / QuickGO
Orthologs
Databases	NCBI: entry; OMA: entry
Species	Human	Mouse
Entrez	5443	18976
Ensembl	ENSG00000115138	ENSMUSG00000020660
UniProt	P01189	P01193
RefSeq (mRNA)	NM_000939; NM_001035256; NM_001319204; NM_001319205	NM_008895; NM_001278581; NM_001278582; NM_001278583; NM_001278584
RefSeq (protein)	NP_000930; NP_001030333; NP_001306133; NP_001306134	NP_001265510; NP_001265511; NP_001265512; NP_001265513; NP_032921
Location (UCSC)	Chr 2: 25.16 – 25.17 Mb	Chr 12: 4 – 4.01 Mb
PubMed search
- Wikidata
View/Edit Human	View/Edit Mouse

proopiomelanocortin derivatives

POMC
γ-MSH	ACTH		β-lipotropin
	α-MSH	CLIP	γ-lipotropin	β-endorphin
			β-MSH

Adrenocorticotropic hormone (ACTH; also adrenocorticotropin, corticotropin) is a polypeptide tropic hormone produced by and secreted by the anterior pituitary gland. It is also used as a medication and diagnostic agent. ACTH is an important component of the hypothalamic-pituitary-adrenal axis and is often produced in response to biological stress (along with its precursor corticotropin-releasing hormone from the hypothalamus). Its principal effects are increased production and release of cortisol and androgens by the zona fasciculata and zona reticularis, respectively. ACTH is also related to the circadian rhythm in many organisms.

Deficiency of ACTH is an indicator of secondary adrenal insufficiency (suppressed production of ACTH due to an impairment of the pituitary gland or hypothalamus, cf. hypopituitarism) or tertiary adrenal insufficiency (disease of the hypothalamus, with a decrease in the release of corticotropin releasing hormone (CRH)). Conversely, chronically elevated ACTH levels occur in primary adrenal insufficiency (e.g. Addison's disease) when adrenal gland production of cortisol is chronically deficient. In Cushing's disease, a pituitary tumor leads to excessive production of ACTH, which stimulates the adrenal cortex to produce high levels of cortisol.

== Production and regulation ==
POMC, ACTH and β-lipotropin are secreted from corticotropic cells in the anterior lobe (or adenohypophysis) of the pituitary gland in response to the hormone corticotropin-releasing hormone (CRH) released by the hypothalamus. The pre-pro-opiomelanocortin (Pre-POMC) is the precursor of POMC, its cleavage forms POMC. ACTH, on the other hand, is produced from the cleavage of POMC. The removal of the signal peptide during translation produces the 241-amino acid polypeptide POMC, which undergoes a series of post-translational modifications such as phosphorylation and glycosylation before it is proteolytically cleaved by endopeptidases to yield various polypeptide fragments with varying physiological activity. These fragments include:

polypeptide fragment	alias	abbreviation	amino acid residues
NPP		NPP	27–102
melanotropin gamma		γ-MSH	77–87
potential peptide			105–134
corticotropin	adrenocorticotropic hormone	ACTH	138–176
melanotropin alpha	melanocyte-stimulating hormone	α-MSH	138–150
corticotropin-like intermediate peptide		CLIP	156–176
lipotropin beta		β-LPH	179–267
lipotropin gamma		γ-LPH	179–234
melanotropin beta		β-MSH	217–234
beta-endorphin			237–267
met-enkephalin			237–241

In order to regulate the secretion of ACTH, many substances secreted within this axis exhibit slow/intermediate and fast feedback-loop activity. Glucocorticoids secreted from the adrenal cortex work to inhibit CRH secretion by the hypothalamus, which in turn decreases anterior pituitary secretion of ACTH. Glucocorticoids may also inhibit the rates of POMC gene transcription and peptide synthesis. The latter is an example of a slow feedback loop, which works on the order of hours to days, whereas the former works on the order of minutes.

The half-life of ACTH in human blood is reported to be between ten and 30 minutes.

== Structure ==
ACTH consists of 39 amino acids, the first 13 of which (counting from the N-terminus) may be cleaved to form α-melanocyte-stimulating hormones (α-MSH) (this common structure is responsible for excessively tanned skin in Addison's disease). After a short period of time, ACTH is cleaved into α-melanocyte-stimulating hormone (α-MSH) and CLIP, a peptide with unknown activity in humans.

In the human body, total weight ACTH is 4540 Da.

== Function ==
ACTH stimulates secretion of glucocorticoid steroid hormones from adrenal cortex cells, especially in the zona fasciculata of the adrenal glands. ACTH acts by binding to cell surface ACTH receptors, which are located primarily on adrenocortical cells of the adrenal cortex. The ACTH receptor is a seven-membrane-spanning G protein-coupled receptor. Upon ligand binding, the receptor undergoes conformation changes that stimulate the enzyme adenylyl cyclase, which leads to an increase in intracellular cAMP and subsequent activation of protein kinase A.

ACTH influences steroid hormone secretion by both rapid short-term mechanisms that take place within minutes and slower long-term actions. The rapid actions of ACTH include stimulation of cholesterol delivery to the mitochondria where the P450scc enzyme is located. P450scc catalyzes the first step of steroidogenesis that is cleavage of the side-chain of cholesterol. ACTH also stimulates lipoprotein uptake into cortical cells. This increases the bioavailability of cholesterol in the cells of the adrenal cortex.

The long term actions of ACTH include stimulation of the transcription of the genes coding for steroidogenic enzymes, especially P450scc, steroid 11β-hydroxylase, and their associated electron transfer proteins. This effect is observed over several hours.

In addition to steroidogenic enzymes, ACTH also enhances transcription of mitochondrial genes that encode for subunits of mitochondrial oxidative phosphorylation systems. These actions are probably necessary to supply the enhanced energy needs of adrenocortical cells stimulated by ACTH.

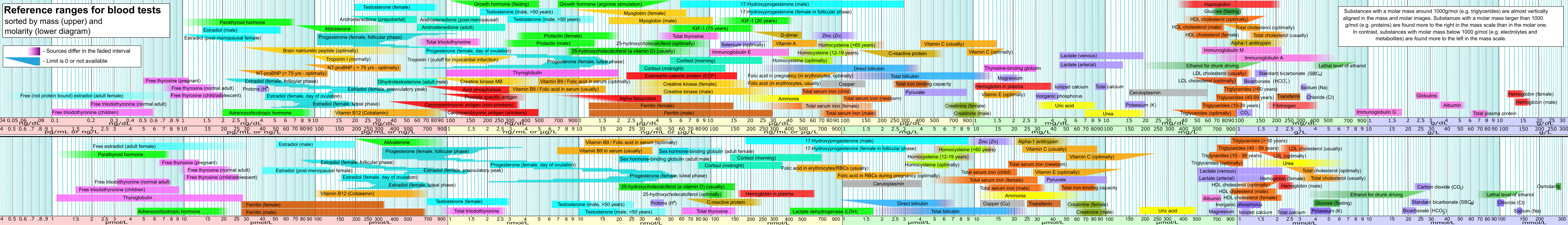
Reference ranges for blood tests, showing adrenocorticotropic hormone (green at left) among the hormones with smallest concentration in the blood

== ACTH receptors outside the adrenal gland ==
As indicated above, ACTH is a cleavage product of the pro-hormone, proopiomelanocortin (POMC), which also produces other hormones including α-MSH that stimulates the production of melanin. A family of related receptors mediates the actions of these hormones, the MCR, or melanocortin receptor family. These are mainly not associated with the pituitary-adrenal axis. MC2R is the ACTH receptor.

While it has a crucial function in regulating the adrenal glands, it is also expressed elsewhere in the body, specifically in the osteoblast, which is responsible for making new bone, a continual and highly regulated process in the bodies of air-breathing vertebrates. The functional expression of MC2R on the osteoblast was discovered by Isales et alia in 2005. Since that time, it has been demonstrated that the response of bone forming cells to ACTH includes production of VEGF, as it does in the adrenal. This response might be important in maintaining osteoblast survival under some conditions. If this is physiologically important, it probably functions in conditions with short-period or intermittent ACTH signaling, since with continual exposure of osteoblasts to ACTH, the effect was lost in a few hours.

== History ==
While working on her dissertation, Evelyn M. Anderson co-discovered ACTH with James Bertram Collip and David Landsborough Thomson and, in a paper published in 1933, explained its function in the body.

An active synthetic form of ACTH, consisting of the first 23 amino acids of native ACTH, was first made by Klaus Hofmann at the University of Pittsburgh.

== Associated conditions ==
- Diseases of the pituitary, the gland that produces, among others, the hormone ACTH
- Hypopituitarism, the hyposecretion of ACTH in the pituitary, leading to secondary adrenal insufficiency (a form of hypocorticism)
- Addison's disease, the primary adrenal insufficiency (another form of hypocorticism)
- Cushing's syndrome, hypercorticism, one of the causes is hypersecretion of ACTH
- Small cell carcinoma, a common cause of ACTH secreted ectopically
- Congenital adrenal hyperplasia, diseases in the production of cortisol
- Nelson's syndrome, the rapid enlargement of the ACTH producing pituitary after the removal of both adrenal glands
- Adrenoleukodystrophy, can be accompanied by adrenal insufficiency
- West syndrome ("infantile spasms"), a disease where ACTH is used as a therapy
- Postorgasmic illness syndrome (POIS), through production of tyrosine hydroxylase and dopamine β-hydroxylase, which two enzymes comprise the biochemical mechanism by which norepinephrine and epinephrine are produced.
- Critical illness-related corticosteroid insufficiency
- DAVID syndrome, a genetic disorder that is characterized by adrenocorticotropic hormone deficiency combined with common variable immunodeficiency and hypogammaglobulinemia.

== See also ==
- Semax, a synthetic analogue fragment of adrenocorticotropic hormone
