= Anorgasmia =

Inability to achieve orgasm despite adequate stimulation

- Specialty: Psychiatry, gynecology, urology

Anorgasmia is a type of sexual dysfunction in which a person cannot achieve orgasm despite adequate sexual stimulation. Anorgasmia is far more common in women (4.6%) than in men, and is especially rare in younger men. The problem is greater in women who are post-menopausal. In men, it is most closely associated with delayed ejaculation. Anorgasmia can often cause sexual frustration.

== Causes ==
The condition is sometimes classified as a psychiatric disorder. However, it can also be caused by physiological problems such as diabetic neuropathy, multiple sclerosis, Parkinson's disease, genital mutilation on any gender, complications from genital surgery, pelvic trauma (such as from a straddle injury caused by falling on the bars of a climbing frame, bicycle or gymnastics beam), hormonal imbalances, total hysterectomy, spinal cord injury, cauda equina syndrome, uterine embolisation, childbirth trauma (vaginal tearing naturally or through the use of forceps or suction or a large or unclosed episiotomy), vulvodynia and cardiovascular disease.

=== Drugs-induced ===
A common cause of anorgasmia, in both women and men, is the use of antidepressants, particularly selective serotonin reuptake inhibitors (SSRIs). Though reporting of anorgasmia as a side effect of SSRIs is not precise, studies have found that 17–41% of users of such medications are affected by some form of sexual dysfunction.

Another cause of anorgasmia is cocaine use and opiate addiction, particularly to heroin.

=== Primary anorgasmia ===
Primary anorgasmia is a condition where one has never experienced an orgasm. This is significantly more common in women, although it can occur in men who lack the gladipudendal (bulbocavernosus) reflex. Women with this condition can sometimes achieve a relatively low level of sexual excitement. Frustration, restlessness, and pelvic pain or a heavy pelvic sensation may occur because of vascular engorgement. On occasion, there may be no obvious reason why orgasm is unobtainable. In such cases, women report that they are unable to orgasm even if they have a caring, skilled partner, adequate time and privacy, and an absence of medical issues which would affect sexual satisfaction.

About 15% of women report difficulties with orgasm, and 10% of women in the United States have never climaxed. 29% of women always have orgasms with their partner.

Some social theorists believe that inability to orgasm may be related to residual psychosocial perceptions that female sexual desire is somehow 'wrong', and that this stems from the age of Victorian repression. It is argued that this view may impede some women – perhaps those raised in a more repressed environment – from being able to experience natural and healthy sexual feeling.

A significant genetic influence was seen with an estimated heritability for difficulty reaching orgasm during intercourse of 34% (95% confidence interval 27–40%) and 45% (95% confidence interval 38–52%) for orgasm during masturbation.

=== Secondary anorgasmia ===
Secondary anorgasmia is the loss of the ability to have orgasms (as opposed to primary anorgasmia which indicates a person who has never had an orgasm) or loss of the ability to reach orgasm of past intensity. The cause may be alcoholism, depression, grief, pelvic surgery (such as total hysterectomy) or injuries, certain medications, death-grip, illness, estrogen deprivation associated with menopause, or rape.

==== Prostatectomy ====
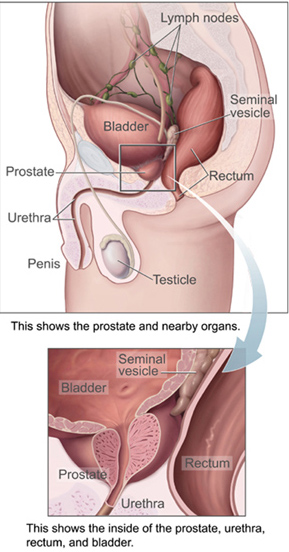
The prostate and surrounding organs.

Secondary anorgasmia is close to 50% among males undergoing prostatectomy; 80% among radical prostatectomies. This is generally caused by damage to the primary nerves serving the penile area, which pass near the prostate gland. Removal of the prostate frequently damages or even completely removes these nerves, making sexual response unreasonably difficult. Radical prostatectomies are usually given to younger males who are expected to live more than 10 years. At more advanced ages, the prostate is less likely to grow during that person's remaining lifetime.

=== Situational anorgasmia ===
People who are orgasmic in some situations may not be in others. A person may have an orgasm from one type of stimulation but not from another, achieve orgasm with one partner but not another, or have an orgasm only under certain conditions or only with a certain type or amount of foreplay. These common variations are within the range of normal sexual expression and should not be considered problematic.

A person who is troubled by experiencing situational anorgasmia should be encouraged to explore alone and with their partner those factors that may affect whether or not they are orgasmic, such as fatigue, emotional concerns, feeling pressured to have sex when they are not interested, or a partner's sexual dysfunction. In the relatively common case of female situational anorgasmia during penile-vaginal intercourse, some sex therapists recommend that couples incorporate manual or vibrator stimulation during intercourse, or using the female-above position as it may allow for greater stimulation of the clitoris by the penis or pubic symphysis or both, and it allows the woman better control of movement.

== Diagnosis ==
Effective treatment for anorgasmia depends on the cause. In the case of women with psychological sexual trauma or inhibition, psychosexual counselling might be advisable and could be obtained through general practitioner (GP) referral.

Women with anorgasmia with no obvious psychological cause would need to be examined by their GP to check for absence of disease. Blood tests would also need to be done (full blood count, liver function, oestradiol/estradiol, total testosterone, SHBG, FSH/LH, prolactin, thyroid function, lipids and fasting blood sugar) to check for other conditions such as diabetes, lack of ovulation, low thyroid function or hormone imbalances. The normal thresholds for these tests and timing in a woman's menstrual cycle is detailed in Berman et al., 2005.

They would then need to be referred to a specialist in sexual medicine. The specialist would check the patient's blood results for hormonal levels, thyroid function and diabetes, evaluate genital blood flow and genital sensation, as well as giving a neurological work-up to determine the degree (if any) of nerve damage.

Recently, it has been proposed to add a subtype of female orgasmic disorder, called reduced orgasmic intensity, and field trials are underway to assess the suitability of this proposal.

== Treatment ==
Just as with erectile dysfunction in men, lack of sexual function in women may be treated with hormonal patches or tablets to correct hormonal imbalances, clitoral vacuum pump devices and medication to improve blood flow, sexual sensation and arousal.

Many practitioners today treat both men and women who have SSRI-induced anorgasmia with sildenafil, more commonly known as Viagra. While this approach is known to work well in men with sexual dysfunction, it is only recently that the effectiveness of sildenafil in women with sexual dysfunction is coming to light. A 1999 study by H. G. Nurnberg et al. showed a complete or very significant reversal of their sexual dysfunction upon taking sildenafil one hour prior to sexual activity. In this study, eight out of the nine women required 50 mg of sildenafil while the 9th woman required 100 mg of sildenafil.

Another option for women who have SSRI-induced anorgasmia is the use of vardenafil. Vardenafil is a type 5 phosphodiesterase (PDE5) inhibitor that facilitates muscle relaxation and improves penile erection in men. However, there is controversy about the efficiency of the drug used in the reversal of female sexual dysfunction. Vardenafil is similar to sildenafil, but vardenafil is less expensive and may be covered under some insurance plans. A study by A.K. Ashton M.D. has shown that in the case of one particular woman, the effects of vardenafil as opposed to sildenafil have not only been comparable in the effectiveness, but that vardenafil is cheaper and reversal of sexual dysfunction requires a smaller dose. So far, vardenafil has been approved by the Food and Drug administration only for use in men.

The NIH states that yohimbine hydrochloride has been shown in human studies to be possibly effective in the treatment of male impotence resulting from erectile dysfunction or SSRI usage (e.g., anorgasmia). Published reports have shown it to be effective in the treatment of orgasmic dysfunction in men.

Cabergoline, an agonist of dopamine D_{2} receptors which inhibits prolactin production, was found in a small study to fully restore orgasm in one third of anorgasmic subjects, and partially restore orgasm in another third. Limited data has shown that the drug amantadine may help to relieve SSRI-induced sexual dysfunction. Cyproheptadine, buspirone, stimulants such as amphetamines (including the antidepressant bupropion), nefazodone and yohimbine have been used to treat SSRI-induced anorgasmia. Reducing the SSRI dosage may also resolve anorgasmia problems but not always. There are cases in which sexual dysfunction persist even after treatment discontinuation; this condition is called post-SSRI sexual dysfunction (PSSD).

== See also ==
- Dysorgasmia
- Sexual anhedonia
