= Clitoral pump =

Type of sex toy

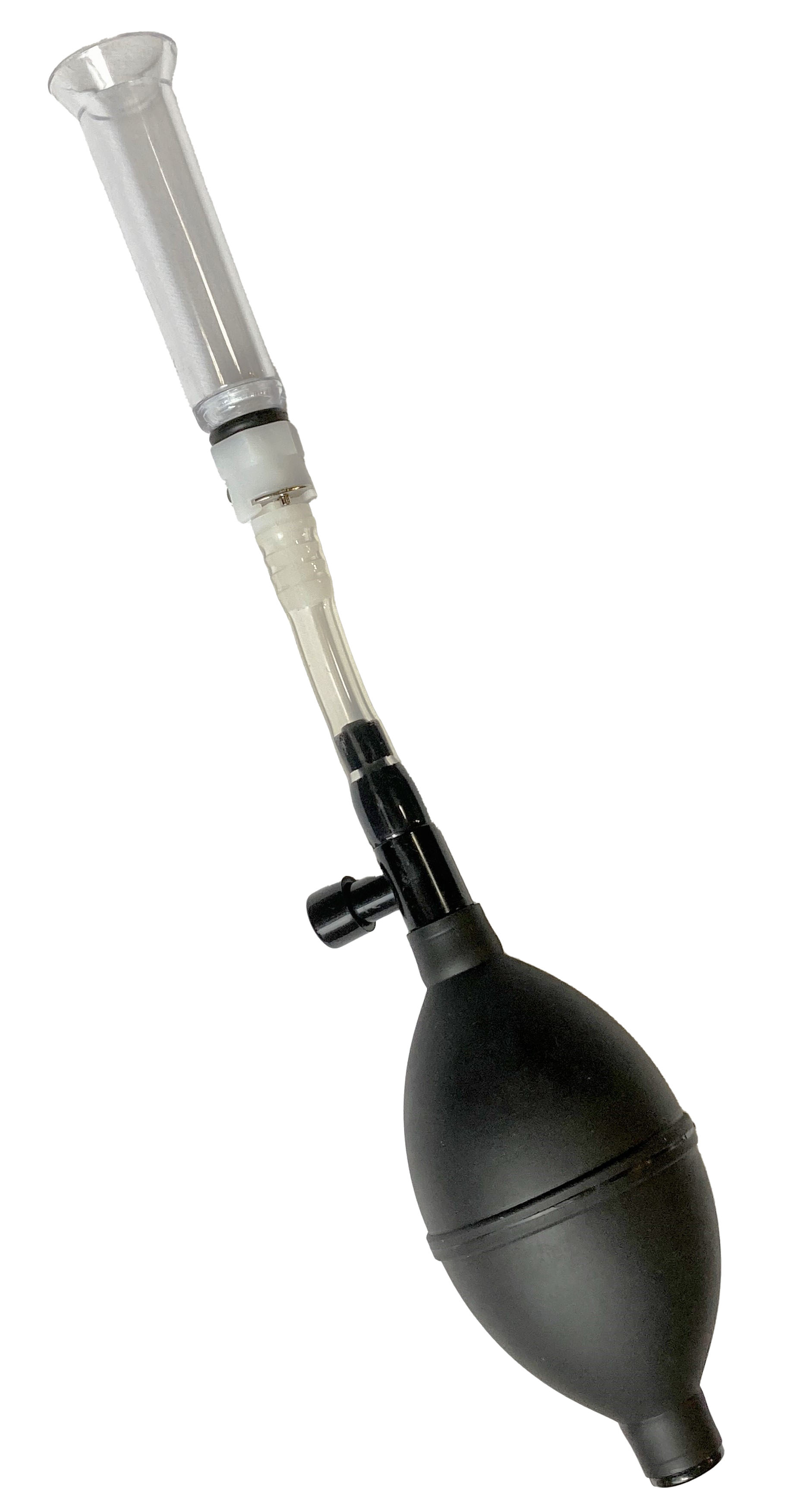
A simple clitoral pump.

A clitoral pump is a sex toy designed for sexual pleasure that is applied to the clitoris to create suction and increase blood flow and sensitivity. A clitoral pump is designed to be used on the entire external clitoris including the clitoral hood. Other designs of pump exist for the labia (both minora and majora), the entire vulva and, in some cases, the nipples.

The clitoral pump, like the penis pump, may be used for temporary effect prior to, or during, masturbation or other sexual activity. This can be gender-affirming for transmasculine individuals who have not undergone phalloplasty. The clitoral pump is not designed to be applied to the vaginal opening nor the inside of the vagina, since it may cause injuries.

The use of a clitoral pump can also help strengthen the pelvic floor muscles and aid in producing vaginal lubrication, which can reduce with age. Their use is often recommended by physicians for treating female sexual problems, including those associated with anorgasmia. Regular use of the device has shown some success in treating age-related arousal concerns, along with sexual dysfunction with other causes. Use of the device for medical purposes is subject to Food and Drug Administration (FDA) regulation in the United States.

== Structure and action ==
A clitoral pump usually consists of the cylinder (cup) and a hand pump (hand-squeeze bulb) with a tube. The cylinder can be round or oval and is available in different sizes depending on the size of the area stimulated. The smaller variants are intended only for clitoral and clitoral hood sucking providing more focused stimulation, whereas those with a larger head produce a more diffused sensation.

To use the device, the cylinder is placed over the clitoris and a vacuum is created between the skin and device by operation of the hand pump. The sucking effect makes the clitoris throb due to increased blood and skin tension. The hand pump allows complete control of the effect.

A quick air release valve is a safety feature. It is important to release the suction in a controlled manner to prevent injury.

Special variants of hand pumps exist, but in most cases they consist of a rubber bulb and a tube connecting it to the cylinder. Air-pulse clitoral stimulators, produced by manufacturers such as Lovense, provide indirect stimulation as an alternative to traditional suction-based pumps.

== Materials ==
Normally, pumps' bulbs are made of soft pliable materials, such as gel, silicone, rubber or a combination of these. The cylinder, which goes over the clitoris, is usually made from acrylic, or hard plastic or silicone, both of which are easy to clean.

== Types ==
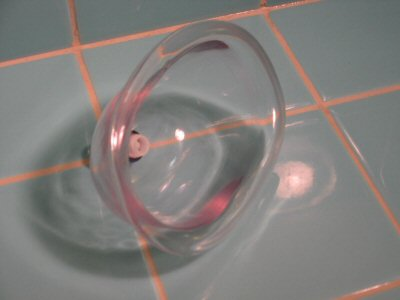
Labial pump

There are three basic types of clitoral pumps:

- Simple pumps. This type is a simple device that includes a cup or cylinder and a hand pump connected to the cup with a rubber tube.
- Pumps with teasers inside the cylinder. This model's cylinder is equipped with special clitoral teasers: small spikes or bumps inside designed to make the stimulation more intense. The textured sleeves can be interchangeable.
- Pumps with a vibrating element. This model creates an intense effect by means of a vibrating bullet inside the cylinder and operated by a separate controller. In most cases, the vibrating bullet is removable.

== See also ==
- Clitoral enlargement methods
- Dildo
- Orgasm
