= Death-grip syndrome =

Slang term for a masturbation technique

Death-grip and death-grip syndrome (DGS) are slang terms describing a supposed phenomenon where one suffers adverse effects from one's aggressive and recurrent masturbation, which result in an unsatisfactory experience when engaging in regular sexual intercourse with a partner. An analogous condition, dead-vagina syndrome, has been asserted to exist in women. The concept of death-grip syndrome is not recognized by any mainstream medical bodies.

== Concept ==
The term has been attributed to a 2003 column by sex columnist Dan Savage.

Although men with the indisposition may still experience an erection, it may impact a relationship negatively due to a sense of being sexually incompatible with a partner due to the habit of lasting too long during sexual activity, and subsequent side-effects such as blue balls or inhibited ejaculation. Some people who have claimed to "experience the death-grip" state that although they can still experience pleasure, the typical vagina feels too loose, and fellatio provides insufficient friction to produce an orgasm. Richard Santucci, chief of urology at Detroit Receiving Hospital's Center for Urologic Reconstruction, believes that "too strong masturbation" is not a common cause of delayed ejaculation, and states that "diabetes, medications, low testosterone, anxiety" are the common causes.

== Perception ==
Some analysts have argued that sexual techniques that have a vacuum effect, such as oral pompoir or vaginal pompoir could alleviate DGS. Some analysts have argued that there are other forms of social conditioning ingrained during adolescence that occur concurrently with DGS, such as a reluctance among men to make audible sounds of pleasure such as moaning. Such silence during sex is learned from growing up in one's household and attempting to remain discreet when around family.

== See also ==
- Anorgasmia
- Delayed ejaculation
- Dysorgasmia
