= Foreplay =

Intimate acts that create sexual arousal

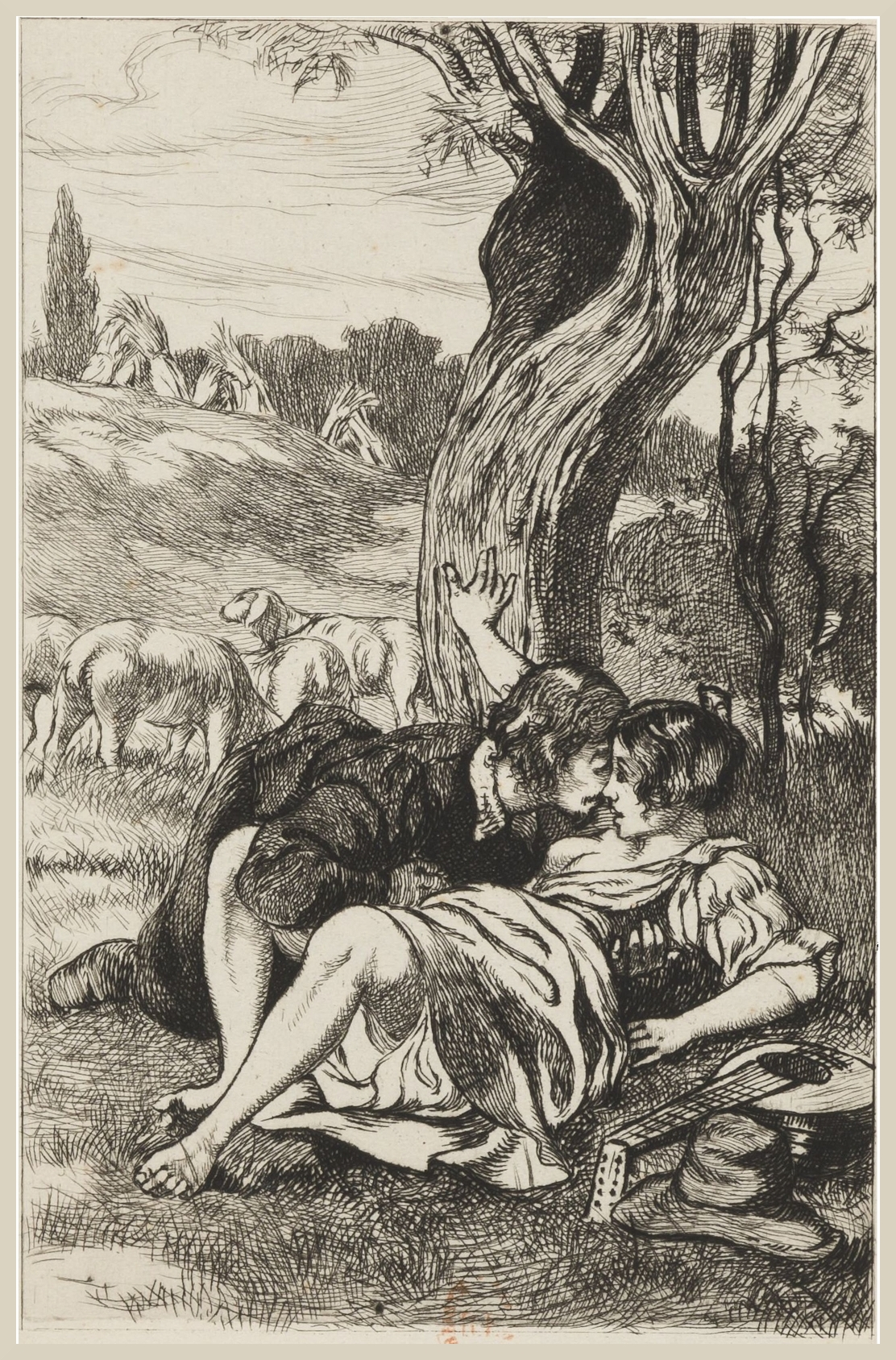
Martin van Maële's print Francion 15 depicts a couple engaging in foreplay outdoors

Foreplay is a set of emotionally and physically intimate acts between one or more people meant to create sexual arousal and desire for sexual activity. Although foreplay is typically understood as physical sexual activity, nonphysical activities, such as mental or verbal acts, may in some contexts be foreplay. This is typically the reason why foreplay tends to be an ambiguous term and means different things to different people. It can consist of various sexual practices such as kissing, sexual touching, removing clothes, oral sex, manual sex, sexual games, and sexual roleplay.

It serves as a critical phase in sexual encounters that heightens emotional intimacy and physical pleasure, making the sexual experience more fulfilling and satisfying. Foreplay has been found to be positively associated with female orgasm.

== Role ==
Foreplay has important physical and psychological effects.

Physically, the sexual organs for both partners receive more blood flow and become aroused. For male partners, this leads to an erection, and for female partners, this results in a clitoral erection and vaginal lubrication. A lack of lubrication may cause dyspareunia. When partners experience sexual arousal from the acts of foreplay, their organs that are susceptible to pleasure become highly sensitive to external stimuli all while at the same time releasing bodily fluids that lubricate the organs to prepare for intercourse. These physical events aforementioned are more easily reached by the male partner as compared to the female partner which is possibly due to the potential consequences of pregnancy and motherhood. Because of this reason, foreplay has been found to play a critical role for the female partner, as noted by sexologist Dr. William Robinson. Robinson suggests that male partners are able to perform sexual intercourse without the requirement of foreplay, whereas female partners require longer acts of foreplay to become sufficiently stimulated and pleasured.

Psychologically, foreplay lowers inhibitions and increases emotional intimacy between partners. Both partners, while performing foreplay, are able to have a mutual experience of understanding and emotions. It can also help partners communicate their preferences more easily, which may help create a more comfortable sexual interaction for both partners.

From a biological perspective, foreplay may be seen as an act that is costly in regards to reproduction (male animal perspective). Nonetheless, the costliness of foreplay becomes insufficient when it has been noted through biological research that it is a worthwhile strategy to increase fertility rates in both the animal and human kingdom. The increased rates of fertility are due to physical and psychological effects aforementioned which also play a role in the effects of the neurohypophysial hormone. This hormone is capable of increasing the rate production of sperm count within the male during the acts of extensive foreplay and therefore results with the female partner having higher chances of becoming impregnated.

== Research ==
According to a survey on heterosexual couples about duration of sexual intercourse and foreplay, neither partner in these relationships was satisfied with the duration of foreplay in their relationships. This suggests that many couples may experience a gap between what they desire and what typically occurs during sexual activity. This survey sampled 152 couples who were mainly university educated and satisfied with their sexual life. In this study, and when compared to some larger studies, men were better at perceiving desired sexual intercourse and foreplay duration for their partner. The average times spent on intercourse were 7 minutes and 12 minutes on foreplay for the couples in this survey. Another result of this survey was that the length of desired foreplay for men and women was about the same.

In a global study of about 12,000 individuals from 27 countries in 6 continents, physical foreplay was rated as "very important" for 63% of men and 60% of women.

According to a study of individuals in committed romantic relationships, pornography and sexual media usage does not play a role in satisfaction with time spent on foreplay, although other aspects of sexual satisfaction can be impacted by this type of sexual media. This means that foreplay is an important part of the sexual script, and social influences on the sexual script such as pornography and provocative sexual media do not impact foreplay. Time spent on foreplay is an important part of becoming sexually aroused and unique to each individual, and individuals still need the same amount of foreplay in order to become sexually aroused despite misconceptions surrounding what people learn from consuming pornography.

== Games ==
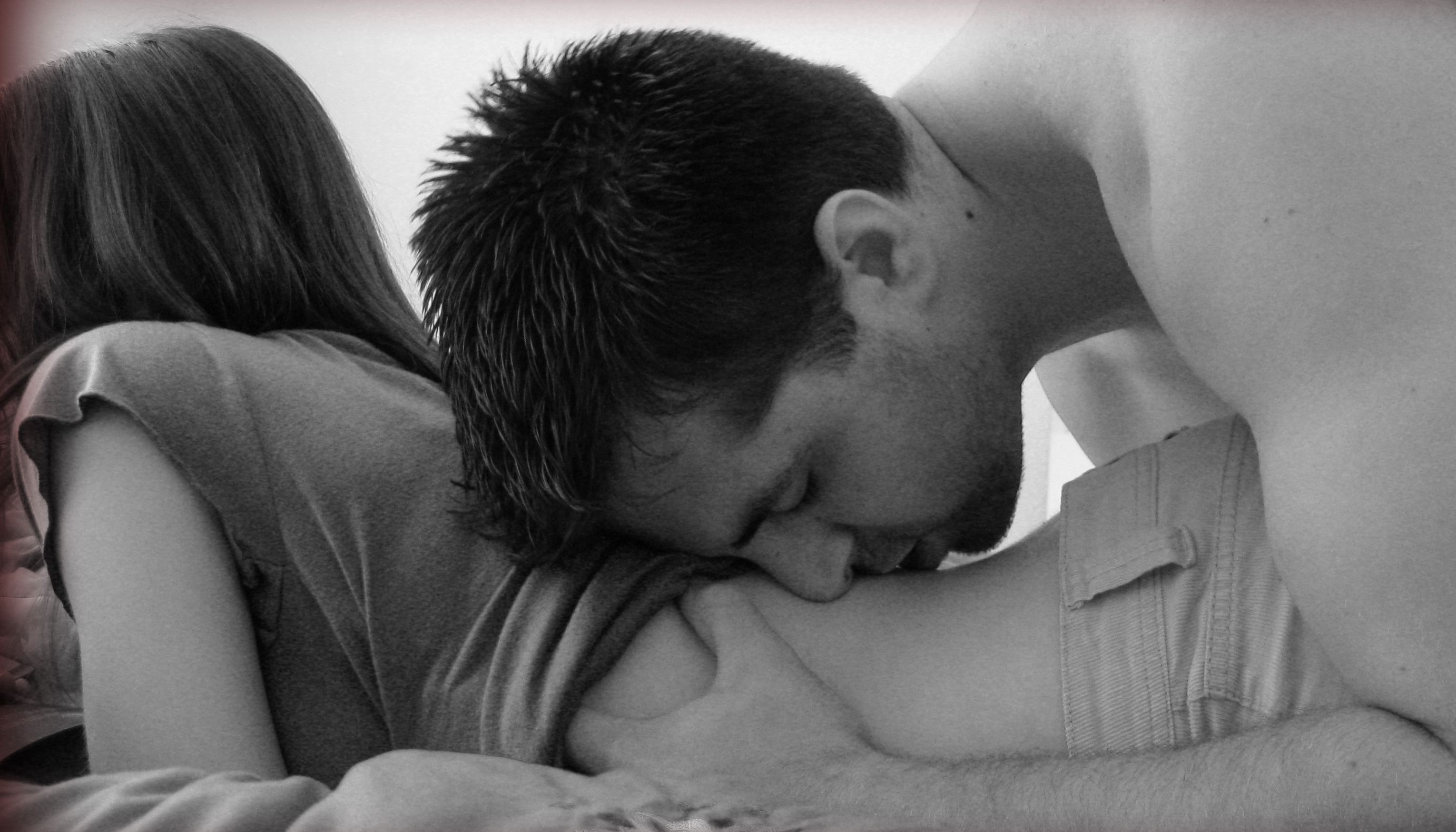
Foreplay by kissing a woman's back moving towards her hips

Sexual role-playing or sex games can create sexual interest. These games can be played in a variety of situations, and have been enhanced by technology. This type of extended foreplay can involve SMS messaging (sexting), phone calls, online chat, or other forms of distance communication, which are intended to stimulate fantasizing about the forthcoming encounter. This form of foreplay does not require physical presence, as the tantalization builds sexual tension.

A card or board game can be played for foreplay. The objective of the game is for the partners to indulge their fantasies. The loser can, for example, be required to remove clothing, give the winner a sensual foot massage, or perform some other sexual act. A sensuous atmosphere can also be enhanced by candles, drinks, sensual food or suggestive clothing. Even a suggestion of the use of sex toys or the playing of games involving fetish, sexual bondage, or blindfolding is an indication of sexual interest.

Some couples create sexual interest by watching erotic and pornographic videos. Role playing may involve the partners wearing costumes, to create and maintain a sexual fantasy. For variety, the partners can make up a (sexual) story together. One of them starts with a sentence and then the other continues until the story becomes sexually explicit, and it provides an opportunity for the partners to express their sexual fantasies. "Strangers for a day" is a role-playing game which consists of the couple playing roles of the first meeting between them. In a public meeting place, the partners pretend to be strangers meeting for the first time. The objective is for them to flirt and seduce the other, without doing or saying anything that they normally would not do or say at a first meeting.

== Tantric ==
Tantric foreplay is the first step in the lovemaking session, according to the tantra principles. Tantric sex is against rushing things for the purpose of reaching an orgasm, so tantric foreplay is a way to prepare the body and the mind for the union between the two bodies. The tantric rules say that foreplay must be focused on the preparation before sexual intercourse. Tantric foreplay may include sensual baths between the two partners in a relaxing atmosphere. Fragrance oil and candles may also be used to set up the mood.

Tantric foreplay is only about giving each other time to connect spiritually and bind. Staring at each other while in a cross-legged position and touching the other's hand palms is a usual foreplay tactic used by tantra practitioners. Tantric foreplay may also include Tantra massages. The massage that is applied, according to the tantric philosophy, is not for reaching orgasms but for giving each other pleasure and connecting at a spiritual level.

== History ==
There are many historical references to foreplay, with many artistic depictions. The Ancient Indian work Kama Sutra mentions different types of embracing, kissing, and marking with nails and teeth. It also mentions BDSM activities such as slapping and moaning as "play". There are also examples of the use of foreplay in marital advice literature that dates back to the early 1900s.

== See also ==
- Making out
