= Sexual communication =

Conversation between partners about sex

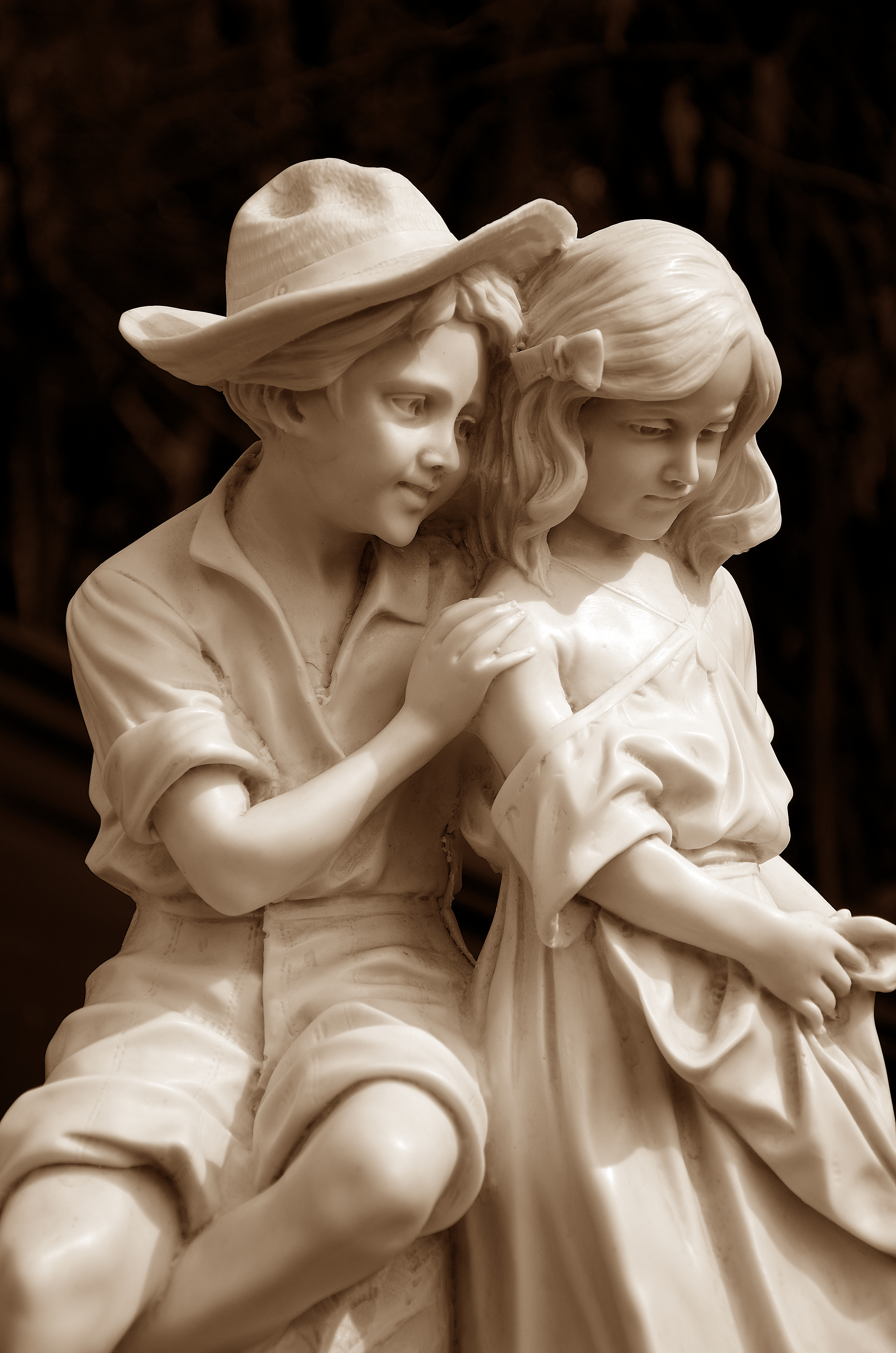
Sculpture "Your love is all I need to feel complete" in India

Sexual communication is a conversation between partners about sex, which is necessary to obtain sexual consent, to learn about likes and dislikes, and to obtain sexual satisfaction.

Sexual communication is a transitional stage from the romantic period of a relationship to a closer intimate and sexual relationship between partners.

Sexual communication in different countries is based on the partners' chosen religion and marriage customs, so it can start at different stages of the partners' relationship.

== Meaning for sex life ==
- Sexual communication is necessary for partners to share their sexual experiences with each other based on trust and respect, in a safe manner.
- In order to initiate sexual relations, consent to sex is essential, meaning that consent is free, informed, revocable, enthusiastic and specific.
- Sexual relations that began without consent to sex, as well as consent to sex that was obtained through a false promise to marry, are considered rape.
- Sexual communication includes being aware of the STD (sexually transmitted disease) status of partners, discussing the purpose of the relationship, getting tested for STDs together, and safe sex and contraceptives.
- Positive sexual communication is associated with sexual satisfaction in relationships and well-being.
- Sexual communication helps partners to better understand each other to build intimate relationships, to understand the differences in perceptions and feelings of partners in sexual activity.
- Talking about sex opens up self-awareness for self-reflection for conscious sex with a partner.

== Forms of sexual communication ==
Sexual communication occurs in various forms:

- Physical communication is physical actions that speak louder than words: a look, a gently placed hand can speak better than verbally.
- Sexual cues are verbal or non-verbal cues to a partner to communicate desired or undesired actions to follow. Sexual experience is more pleasant and more meaningful when partners can freely communicate their desires to each other: touch, kiss.
- Verbal communication should be tactful, without inconvenience or discomfort. Good conversational communication about sex can improve sexual desire and arousal in partners and help care for partners' sexual health.
- Education about sex it is important for children to gain basic knowledge about human sexuality and safe and healthy sexual relationships, and sexuality education provides such opportunities. For adults, sex education expands knowledge about sex, dispels myths and informs about the biological and ethical aspects of this area of life.
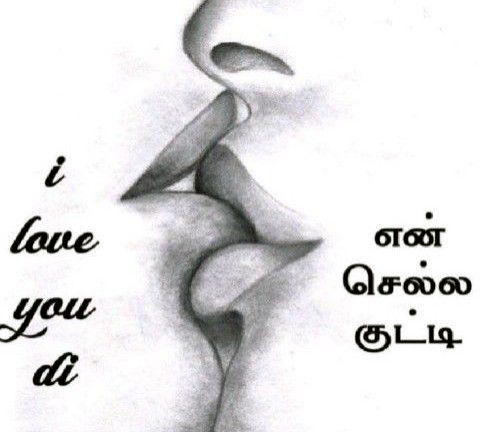
- Love feel
  Intimacy is a necessary part of an emotional and intimate sexual relationship between partners, which strengthens the relationship and brings individuality to the couple's romantic relationship.

== Scientific research ==
According to research conducted by scientists, sexual communication is important for maintaining healthy sexual function. Studies of different years, starting from the 1970s. show that couples with more sexual difficulties have problems with sexual communication and sexual expression. Research conducted in 2014 shows that that couples who have more sexual difficulties have problems with sexual communication and sexual expression. Research conducted in 2014 shows that sexual self-disclosure is important for the health of sexual function and sexual satisfaction, which is one of the prevention methods for sexual dysfunction. Sexual self-disclosure involves discussing sexual preferences with partners, the desire to participate in a certain sexual activity, about sexual values and past experiences.

== Other biologic species ==
Sexual communication is widespread in biology, and occurs in many organisms, e.g. bacteria, fungi, protozoa, insects, vertebrates and flowering plants. Sexual communication, in general, refers to the use of signals to promote or modulate sexual interaction, and appears to operate at three different levels. (a) At the primary level sexual communication increases the likelihood of sexual interaction between two individuals leading to the production of progeny. (b) At the secondary level, signaling is modulated to avoid inbreeding and to facilitate outbreeding, presumably because outbreeding promotes hybrid vigor and the avoidance of expression of deleterious alleles in progeny (inbreeding depression). (c) Sexual communication is also used to facilitate selection among potential mates based on fitness characteristics in order to facilitate vigor among progeny.

== See also ==
- Human sexuality
- Sex consent
- Sexual ethics
- Sexual ethics in Islam and in the Western World
- Human sexual activity
- Orgasm control
- Orgastic potency
- Sociosexual orientation
