= Sexual anhedonia =

Condition in which an individual cannot feel pleasure from an orgasm

Sexual anhedonia, also known as pleasure dissociative orgasmic disorder, is a condition in which an individual cannot feel pleasure (see anhedonia) from an orgasm. It is thought to be a variant of hypoactive sexual desire disorder.

== Overview ==
Normally, humans feel pleasure from an orgasm; upon reaching a climax, chemicals are released in the brain, and motor-signals are activated that will cause quick cycles of muscle contraction in the corresponding areas of both males and females. Sometimes these signals can cause other involuntary muscle contractions, such as body movements and vocalization. Finally, during orgasm, upward neural signals go to the cerebral cortex and feelings of intense pleasure are experienced. People with this disorder are aware of reaching an orgasm, as they can feel the physical effects of it, but they experience very limited or no sort of pleasure.

== Causes ==
It is thought that people with sexual anhedonia have a dysfunction in the release of the chemical dopamine in the nucleus accumbens, the brain's primary reward center. This part of the brain is thought to play a role in pleasurable activities, including laughter, exercise, and music. Additionally, it is thought that depression, drug-addiction, high levels of prolactin, low testosterone, and uses of certain medications might play a role in inhibiting dopamine. A spinal cord injury or chronic fatigue syndrome might also occasionally cause this disorder. Age may also be a cause of this disorder.

A sudden-onset of sexual anhedonia can also be a symptom of sensory neuropathy, which is most commonly the result of pyridoxine toxicity (e.g., from large doses of vitamin B6 supplements). In this case, the sexual dysfunction promptly resolves spontaneously once the B6 supplementation is stopped.

Increased serum prolactin (PRL) concentration in patients' brains from psychiatric medicine can also affect sexuality. Psychiatric medicine is known to cause the brain to form more dopamine receptors for the dopamine-blocking-effect. The normal amount of dopamine released during sex is insufficient to stimulate the larger number of dopamine receptors.

== Treatment ==
Several treatment methods have been devised to help patients cope. Exploration of psychological factors is one method, which includes exploring past trauma, abuse, and prohibitions in the cultural and religious history of the person. Sex therapy might also be used as a way of helping to examine and realign the patient's expectations of an orgasm. Contributing medical causes must also be ruled out and medications might have to be switched when appropriate. Additionally, blood-testing might help determine levels of hormones and other things in the bloodstream that might inhibit pleasure. This condition can also be treated with drugs that increase dopamine, such as oxytocin, along with other drugs. In general, it is recommended that a combination of psychological and physiological treatments should be used to treat the disorder.

Other drugs which may be helpful in the treatment of this condition include dopamine agonists, oxytocin, phosphodiesterase type 5 inhibitors, and alpha-2 receptor blockers like yohimbine.

== See also ==
- Anhedonia
- Dysorgasmia
- Dyspareunia

== Bibliography ==
- Csoka AB, Csoka A, Bahrick A, Mehtonen OP (January 2008). "Persistent sexual dysfunction after discontinuation of selective serotonin reuptake inhibitors". The Journal of Sexual Medicine. 5 (1): 227–33. doi:10.1111/j.1743-6109.2007.00630.x. PMID 18173768.
- Courtois F, Charvier K, Leriche A, Vézina JG, Côté I, Raymond D, Jacquemin G, Fournier C, Bélanger M (Oct 2008). "Perceived physiological and orgasmic sensations at ejaculation in spinal cord injured men". J. Sex. Med. 5 (10): 2419–30. doi:10.1111/j.1743-6109.2008.00857.x. PMID 18466272.
- Soler JM, Previnaire JG, Plante P, Denys P, Chartier-Kastler E (December 2008). "Midodrine improves orgasm in spinal cord-injured men: the effects of autonomic stimulation". The Journal of Sexual Medicine. 5 (12): 2935–41. doi:10.1111/j.1743-6109.2008.00844.x. PMID 18422493.
- IsHak WW, Berman DS, Peters A (April 2008). "Male anorgasmia treated with oxytocin". The Journal of Sexual Medicine. 5 (4): 1022–1024. doi:10.1111/j.1743-6109.2007.00691.x. PMID 18086171.
