= Human sexual activity =

Manner in which humans engage sexually

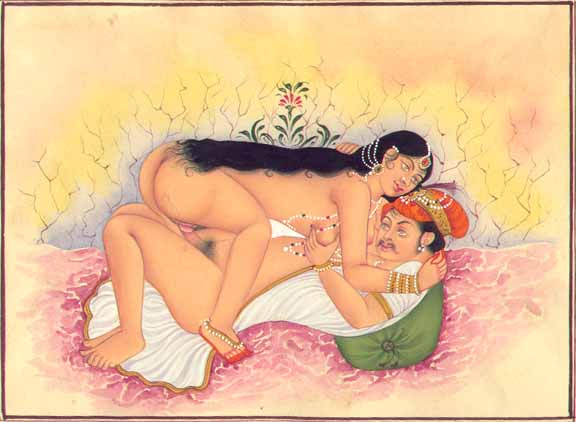
Kama Sutra illustration depicting human sexual activity in which a Mughal couple are seen having sex, with the woman on top of the man

Sexual activity, sexual practice, sexual behaviour or, very broadly, sex is the set of activities people engage in that typically includes any combination of physical intimacy, physical contact with the reproductive organs (genitals) or erogenous zones, and erotic stimulation. Sexual acts range from activities done alone (e.g., masturbation) to acts with another person (e.g., sexual intercourse, non-penetrative sex, oral sex, etc.) or multiple persons (e.g., orgies) in varying patterns of frequency, for a wide variety of reasons. Sexual activity usually results in sexual arousal and physiological changes in the aroused persons, some of which are pronounced while others are more subtle. Certain conduct is intended to arouse the sexual interest of another or enhance one's already-existing sex life with another or between individuals (for instance, foreplay or BDSM).

Certain activities, such as strategies to find or attract partners (flirting, courtship and display behaviour), are not usually considered sex, though they are commonly used to lead to sexual arousal and more explicitly sexual activities.

Human sexual activity has sociological, cognitive, emotional, behavioural and biological aspects. It involves personal bonding, sharing emotions, the physiology of the reproductive system, sex drive, sexual intercourse, and sexual behaviour in all its forms.

In some cultures, sexual activity is considered acceptable only within marriage, while premarital and extramarital sex are taboo. Some sexual activities are illegal either universally or in some countries or subnational jurisdictions, while some are considered contrary to the norms of certain societies or cultures. Two examples that are criminal offences in most jurisdictions are sexual assault and sexual activity with a person below the local age of consent.

== Types ==
Sexual activity can be classified in a number of ways. The practices may be preceded by or consist solely of foreplay. Acts involving one person (autoeroticism) may include sexual fantasy or masturbation. If two people are involved, they may engage in vaginal sex, anal sex, oral sex or manual sex. Penetrative sex between two people may be described as sexual intercourse, but definitions vary. If there are more than two participants in a sex act, it may be referred to as group sex. Autoerotic sexual activity can involve use of dildos, vibrators, butt plugs, and other sex toys, though these devices can also be used with a partner.

Sexual activity can be classified into the gender and sexual orientation of the participants, as well as by the relationship of the participants. The relationships can be ones of marriage, intimate partners, casual sex partners or anonymous. Sexual activity can be regarded as conventional or as alternative, involving, for example, fetishism or BDSM activities.

Fetishism can take many forms, including the desire for certain body parts (partialism) such as breasts, navels, or feet. The object of desire can be shoes, boots, lingerie, clothing, leather or rubber items. Some non-conventional autoerotic practices can be dangerous. These include autoerotic asphyxiation and self-bondage. The potential for injury or even death that exists while engaging in the partnered versions of these fetishes (choking and bondage, respectively) becomes drastically increased in the autoerotic case due to the isolation and lack of assistance in the event of a problem.

Sexual activity that is consensual is sexual activity in which both or all participants agree to take part and are of the age that they can consent. If sexual activity takes place under force or duress, it is considered rape or another form of sexual assault. In different cultures and countries, various sexual activities may be lawful or illegal in regards to the age, gender, marital status or other factors of the participants, or otherwise contrary to social norms or generally accepted sexual morals.

== Mating strategies ==
In evolutionary psychology and behavioral ecology, human mating strategies are a set of behaviors used by individuals to attract, select, and retain mates. Mating strategies overlap with reproductive strategies, which encompass a broader set of behaviors involving the timing of reproduction and the trade-off between quantity and quality of offspring (see life history theory).

Relative to other animals, human mating strategies are unique in their relationship with cultural variables such as the institution of marriage. Humans may seek out individuals with the intention of forming a long-term intimate relationship, marriage, casual relationship, or friendship. The human desire for companionship is one of the strongest human drives. It is an innate feature of human nature, and may be related to the sex drive. The human mating process encompasses the social and cultural processes whereby one person may meet another to assess suitability, the courtship process and the process of forming an interpersonal relationship. Commonalities, however, can be found between humans and nonhuman animals in mating behavior.

== Stages of physiological arousal during sexual stimulation ==
The physiological responses during sexual stimulation are fairly similar for both men and women and there are four phases.

- During the excitement phase, muscle tension and blood flow increase in and around the sexual organs, heart and respiration increase and blood pressure rises. Men and women experience a "sex flush" on the skin of the upper body and face. For women, the vagina becomes lubricated and the clitoris engorges. For men, the penis becomes erect.
- During the plateau phase, heart rate and muscle tension increase further. A man's urinary bladder closes to prevent urine from mixing with semen. A woman's clitoris may withdraw slightly and there is more lubrication, outer swelling and muscles tighten and reduction of diameter.
- During the orgasm phase, breathing becomes extremely rapid and the pelvic muscles begin a series of rhythmic contractions. Both men and women experience quick cycles of muscle contraction of lower pelvic muscles and women often experience uterine and vaginal contractions; this experience can be described as intensely pleasurable, but roughly 15% of women never experience orgasm, and half report having faked it. A large genetic component is associated with how often women experience orgasm.
- During the resolution phase, muscles relax, blood pressure drops, and the body returns to its resting state. Though generally reported that women do not experience a refractory period and thus can experience an additional orgasm, or multiple orgasms soon after the first, some sources state that both men and women experience a refractory period because women may also experience a period after orgasm in which further sexual stimulation does not produce excitement. This period may last from minutes to days and is typically longer for men than women.

Sexual dysfunction is the inability to react emotionally or physically to sexual stimulation in a way projected of the average healthy person; it can affect different stages in the sexual response cycles, which are desire, excitement and orgasm. In the media, sexual dysfunction is often associated with men, but in actuality, it is more commonly observed in females (43 percent) than males (31 percent).

== Psychological aspects ==
Sexual activity can lower blood pressure and overall stress levels. It serves to release tension, elevate mood, and possibly create a profound sense of relaxation, especially in the postcoital period. From a biochemical perspective, sex causes the release of oxytocin and endorphins and boosts the immune system.

=== Motivations ===
People engage in sexual activity for any of a multitude of possible reasons. Although the primary evolutionary purpose of sexual activity is reproduction, research on college students suggested that people have sex for four general reasons: physical attraction, as a means to an end, to increase emotional connection, and to alleviate insecurity.

Most people engage in sexual activity because of pleasure they derive from the arousal of their sexuality, especially if they can achieve orgasm. Sexual arousal can also be experienced from foreplay and flirting, and from fetish or BDSM activities, or other erotic activities. Most commonly, people engage in sexual activity because of the sexual desire generated by a person to whom they feel sexual attraction; but they may engage in sexual activity for the physical satisfaction they achieve in the absence of attraction for another, as in the case of casual or social sex. At times, a person may engage in a sexual activity solely for the sexual pleasure of their partner, such as because of an obligation they may have to the partner or because of love, sympathy or pity they may feel for the partner.

A person may engage in sexual activity for purely monetary considerations, or to obtain some advantage from either the partner or the activity. A man and woman may engage in sexual intercourse with the objective of conception. Some people engage in hate sex, which occurs between two people who strongly dislike or annoy each other. It is related to the idea that opposition between two people can heighten sexual tension, attraction and interest.

==== Self-determination theory ====
Research has found that people also engage in sexual activity for reasons associated with self-determination theory. The self-determination theory can be applied to a sexual relationship when the participants have positive feelings associated with the relationship, not from the social pressures of their partner, but intrinsically motivated to engage in intercourse on their own accord. These participants do not feel guilty or coerced into the partnership. Researchers have proposed the model of self-determined sexual motivation. The purpose of this model is to connect self-determination and sexual motivation. This model has helped to explain how people are sexually motivated when involved in self-determined dating relationships. This model also links the positive outcomes, (satisfying the need for autonomy, competence, and relatedness) gained from sexual motivations.

According to the completed research associated with this model, it was found that people of both sexes who engaged in sexual activity for self-determined motivation had more positive psychological well-being. While engaging in sexual activity for self-determined reasons, the participants also had a higher need for fulfillment. When this need was satisfied, they felt better about themselves. This was correlated with greater closeness to their partner and higher overall satisfaction in their relationship. Though both sexes engaged in sexual activity for self-determined reasons, there were some differences found between males and females. It was concluded that females had more motivation than males to engage in sexual activity for self-determined reasons. Females also had higher satisfaction and relationship quality than males did from the sexual activity. Overall, research concluded that psychological well-being, sexual motivation, and sexual satisfaction were all positively correlated when dating couples partook in sexual activity for self-determined reasons.

== Frequency ==
The frequency of sexual activity might range from zero to 15 or 20 times a week. A percentage of the population are sexually abstinent. Frequency of intercourse tends to decline with age. Some post-menopausal women experience decline in frequency of sexual intercourse, while others do not. According to the Kinsey Institute, the average frequency of sexual intercourse in the US for individuals with partners is 112 times per year (age 18–29), 86 times per year (age 30–39), and 69 times per year (age 40–49). The rate of sexual activity has been declining in the 21st century, a phenomenon that has been described as a sex recession.

=== Adolescents ===
The age at which adolescents become sexually active varies considerably between different cultures and times. (See Prevalence of virginity.) The first sexual act of a child or adolescent is sometimes referred to as the sexualization of the child, and may be considered a milestone or a change of status, as the loss of virginity or innocence. Youth are legally free to have intercourse after they reach the age of consent.

A 1999 survey of students indicated that approximately 40% of ninth graders across the United States report having had sexual intercourse. This figure rises with each grade. Males are more sexually active than females at each of the grade levels surveyed. Sexual activity of young adolescents differs in ethnicity as well. A higher percentage of African American and Hispanic adolescents are more sexually active than white adolescents.

Research on sexual frequency has also been conducted solely on female adolescents who engage in sexual activity. Female adolescents tended to engage in more sexual activity due to positive mood. In female teenagers, engaging in sexual activity was directly positively correlated with being older, greater sexual activity in the previous week or prior day, and more positive mood the previous day or the same day as the sexual activity occurred. Decreased sexual activity was associated with prior or same-day negative mood or menstruation.

Although opinions differ, researchers suggest that sexual activity is an essential part of humans, and that teenagers need to experience sex. According to a study, sexual experiences help teenagers understand pleasure and satisfaction. In relation to hedonic and eudaimonic well-being, it stated that teenagers can positively benefit from sexual activity. The cross-sectional study was conducted in 2008 and 2009 at a rural upstate New York community. Teenagers who had their first sexual experience at age 16 revealed a higher well-being than those who were sexually inexperienced or who became sexually active at age 17. Furthermore, teenagers who had their first sexual experience at age 15 or younger, or who had many sexual partners were not negatively affected and did not have associated lower well-being.

== Health and safety ==
Sexual activity is an innately physiological function, but like other physical activity, it comes with risks. There are four main types of risks that may arise from sexual activity: unwanted pregnancy, contracting a sexually transmitted infection (STI), physical injury, and psychological injury.

=== Unwanted pregnancy ===
Any sexual activity that involves the introduction of semen into a woman's vagina, such as during sexual intercourse, or contact of semen with her vulva, may result in a pregnancy. To reduce the risk of unintended pregnancies, some people who engage in penile–vaginal sex may use contraception, such as birth control pills, a condom, diaphragms, spermicides, hormonal contraception or sterilization. The effectiveness of the various contraceptive methods in avoiding pregnancy varies considerably, and depends on the method rather than the user.

=== Sexually transmitted infections ===
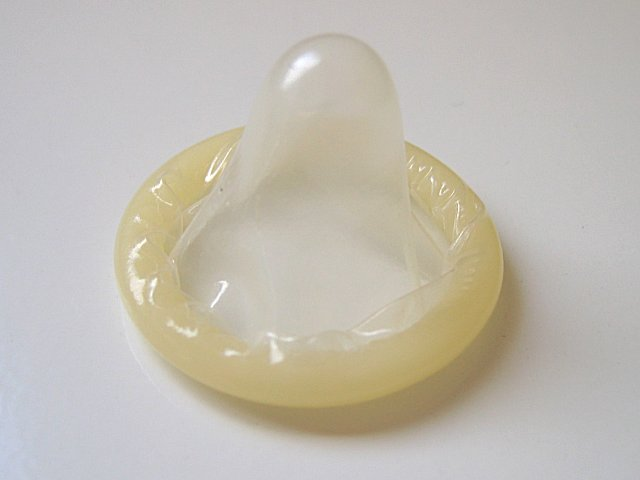
A rolled-up male condom

Sexual activity that involves skin-to-skin contact, exposure to an infected person's bodily fluids or mucous membranes carries the risk of contracting a sexually transmitted infection. People may not be able to detect that their sexual partner has one or more STIs, for example if they are asymptomatic (show no symptoms). The risk of STIs can be reduced by safe sex practices, such as using condoms. Both partners may opt to be tested for STIs before engaging in sex. The exchange of body fluids is not necessary to contract an infestation of crab lice. Crab lice typically are found attached to hair in the pubic area but sometimes are found on coarse hair elsewhere on the body (for example, eyebrows, eyelashes, beard, mustache, chest, armpits, etc.). Pubic lice infestations (pthiriasis) are spread through direct contact with someone who is infested with the louse.

Some STIs like HIV/AIDS can also be contracted by using IV drug needles after their use by an infected person, as well as through childbirth or breastfeeding.

=== Aging ===
Factors such as biological and psychological factors, diseases, mental conditions, boredom with the relationship, and widowhood have been found to contribute to a decrease in sexual interest and activity in old age, but older age does not eliminate the ability to enjoy sexual activity.

== Orientations and society ==
=== Heterosexuality ===
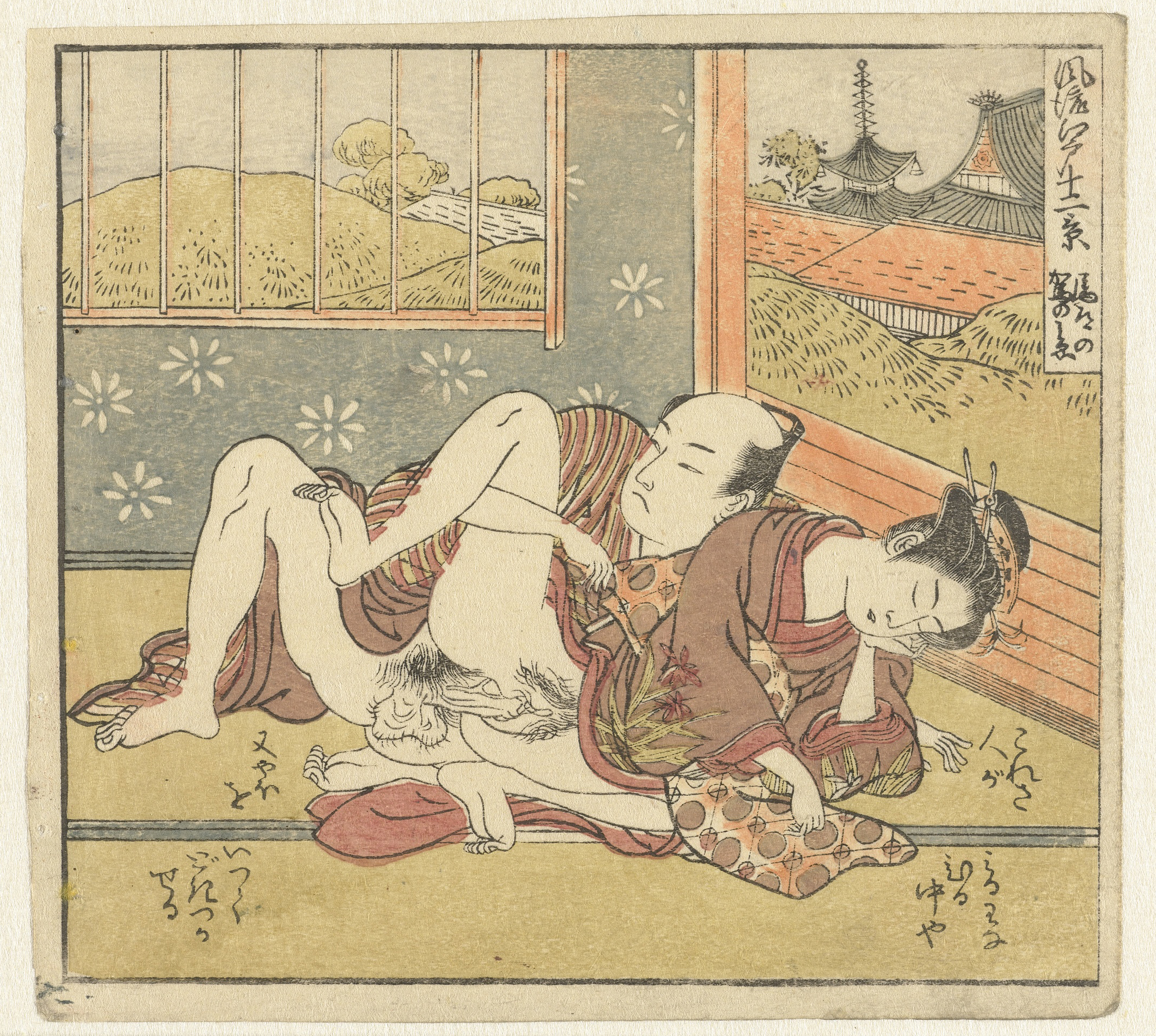
A Japanese shunga depicting a male and a female in sexual activity

Heterosexuality is the romantic or sexual attraction to the opposite sex. Heterosexual practices are institutionally privileged in most countries. In some countries, mostly those where religion has a strong influence on social policy, marriage laws serve the purpose of encouraging people to have sex only within marriage. Sodomy laws have been used to discourage same-sex sexual practices, but they may also affect opposite-sex sexual practices. Laws also ban adults from committing sexual abuse, committing sexual acts with anyone under an age of consent, performing sexual activities in public, and engaging in sexual activities for money (prostitution). Though these laws cover both same-sex and opposite-sex sexual activities, they may differ in regard to punishment, and may be more frequently (or exclusively) enforced on those who engage in same-sex sexual activities.

Different-sex sexual practices may be monogamous, serially monogamous, or polyamorous, and, depending on the definition of sexual practice, abstinent or autoerotic (including masturbation). Additionally, different religious and political movements have tried to influence or control changes in sexual practices including courting and marriage, though in most countries changes occur at a slow rate.

=== Homosexuality ===
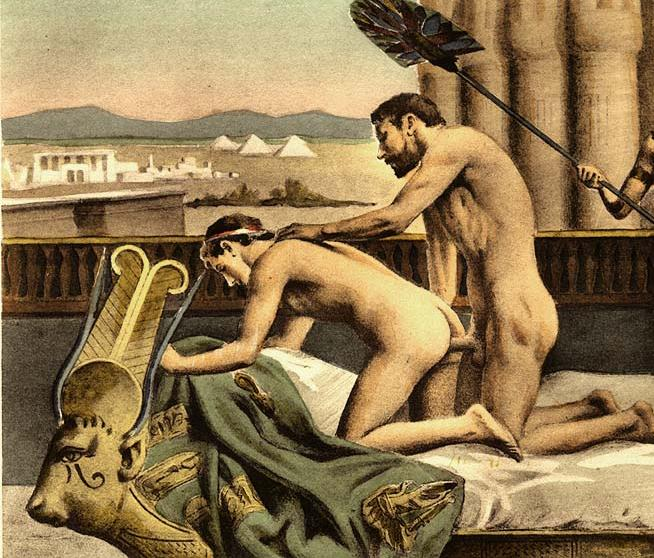
A 19th century illustration by Édouard-Henri Avril depicting two men engaged in sexual activity

Homosexuality is the romantic or sexual attraction to the same sex. People with a homosexual orientation can express their sexuality in a variety of ways, and may or may not express it in their behaviors. Research indicates that many gay men and lesbians want, and succeed in having, committed and durable relationships. For example, survey data indicate that between 40% and 60% of gay men and between 45% and 80% of lesbians are currently involved in a romantic relationship.

It is possible for a person whose sexual identity is mainly heterosexual to engage in sexual acts with people of the same sex. Gay and lesbian people who pretend to be heterosexual are often referred to as being closeted (hiding their sexuality in "the closet"). "Closet case" is a derogatory term used to refer to people who hide their sexuality. Making that orientation public can be called "coming out of the closet" in the case of voluntary disclosure or "outing" in the case of disclosure by others against the subject's wishes (or without their knowledge). Among some communities (called "men on the DL" or "down-low"), same-sex sexual behavior is sometimes viewed as solely for physical pleasure. Men who have sex with men, as well as women who have sex with women, or men on the "down-low" may engage in sex acts with members of the same sex while continuing sexual and romantic relationships with the opposite sex.

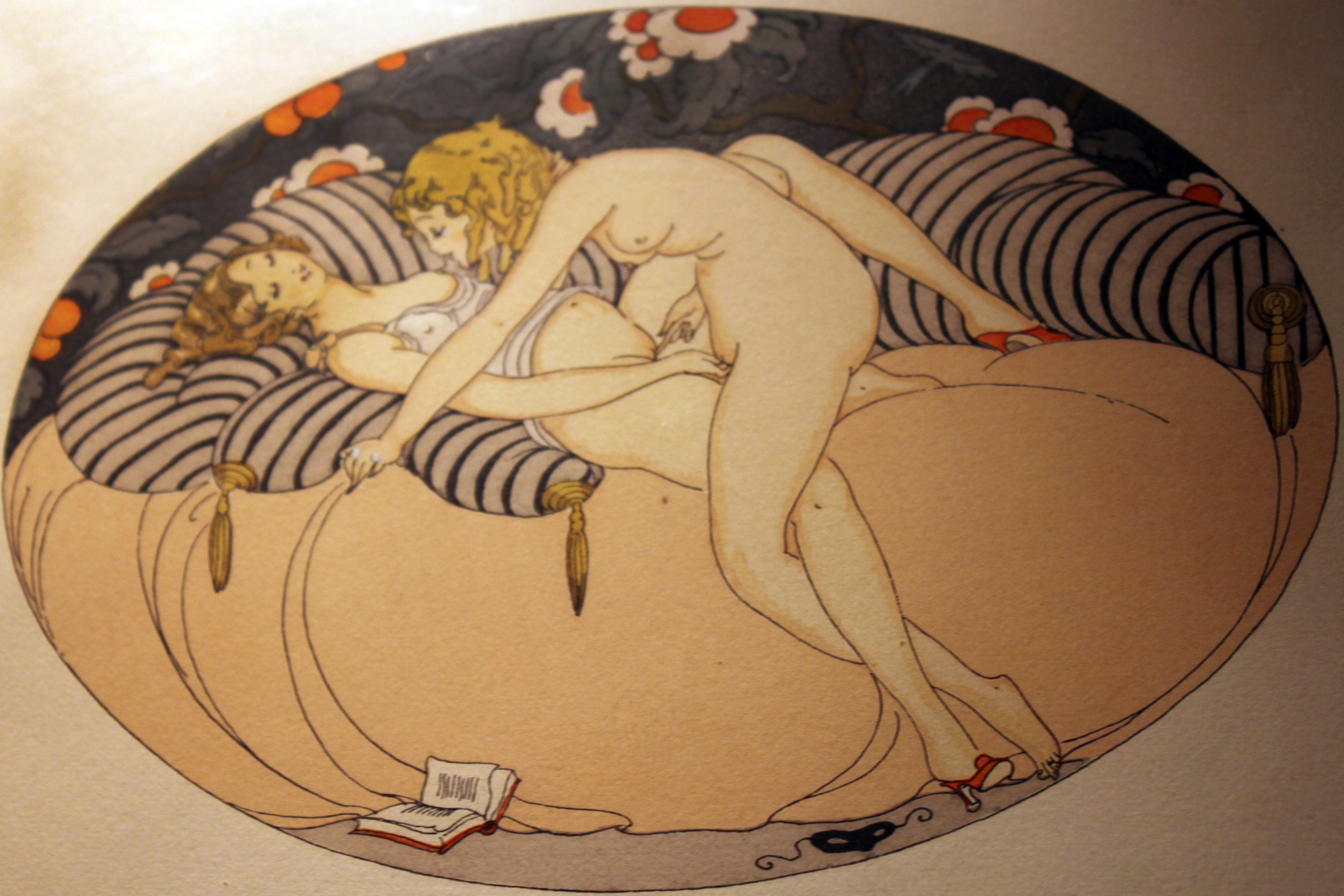
A 1925 Gerda Wegener aquarelle for Les delassements d'Eros, depicting two women engaged in sexual activity

People who engage exclusively in same-sex sexual practices may not identify themselves as gay or lesbian. In sex-segregated environments, individuals may seek relationships with others of their own gender (known as situational homosexuality). In other cases, some people may experiment or explore their sexuality with same (or different) sex sexual activity before defining their sexual identity. Despite stereotypes and common misconceptions, there are no forms of sexual acts exclusive to same-sex sexual behavior that cannot also be found in opposite-sex sexual behavior, except those involving the meeting of the genitalia between same-sex partners – tribadism (generally vulva-to-vulva rubbing) and frot (generally penis-to-penis rubbing).

=== Bisexuality and pansexuality ===
People who have a romantic or sexual attraction to both sexes are referred to as bisexual. People who have a distinct but not exclusive preference for one sex/gender over the other may also identify themselves as bisexual. Like gay and lesbian individuals, bisexual people who pretend to be heterosexual are often referred to as being closeted.

Pansexuality (also referred to as omnisexuality) may or may not be subsumed under bisexuality, with some sources stating that bisexuality encompasses sexual or romantic attraction to all gender identities. Pansexuality is characterized by the potential for aesthetic attraction, romantic love, or sexual desire towards people without regard for their gender identity or biological sex. Some pansexuals suggest that they are gender-blind; that gender and sex are insignificant or irrelevant in determining whether they will be sexually attracted to others. As defined in the Oxford English Dictionary, pansexuality "encompasses all kinds of sexuality; not limited or inhibited in sexual choice with regards to gender or practice".

=== Avoidance of inbreeding ===
Although the main adaptive function of human sexual activity is reproduction, human sexual activity also includes the adaptive constraint of avoiding close inbreeding, since inbreeding can have deleterious effects on progeny. Charles Darwin, who was married to his first cousin Emma Wedgwood, considered that the ill health that plagued his family was a consequence of inbreeding. In general, inbreeding between individuals who are closely genetically related leads to the expression of deleterious recessive mutations. The avoidance of inbreeding as a constraint on human sexual activity is apparent in the near universal cultural inhibitions in human societies of sexual activity between closely related individuals. Human outcrossing sexual activity provides the adaptive benefit of the masking of expression of deleterious recessive mutations.

== Social aspects and issues ==
=== General attitudes ===
Alex Comfort and others propose three potential social aspects of sexual intercourse in humans, which are not mutually exclusive: reproductive, relational, and recreational. The development of the contraceptive pill and other highly effective forms of contraception in the mid- and late 20th century has increased people's ability to segregate these three functions, which still overlap a great deal and in complex patterns. For example: A fertile couple may have intercourse while using contraception to experience sexual pleasure (recreational) and also as a means of emotional intimacy (relational), thus deepening their bonding, making their relationship more stable and more capable of sustaining children in the future (deferred reproductive). This same couple may emphasize different aspects of intercourse on different occasions, being playful during one episode of intercourse (recreational), experiencing deep emotional connection on another occasion (relational), and later, after discontinuing contraception, seeking to achieve pregnancy (reproductive, or more likely reproductive and relational).

=== Religious and ethical ===
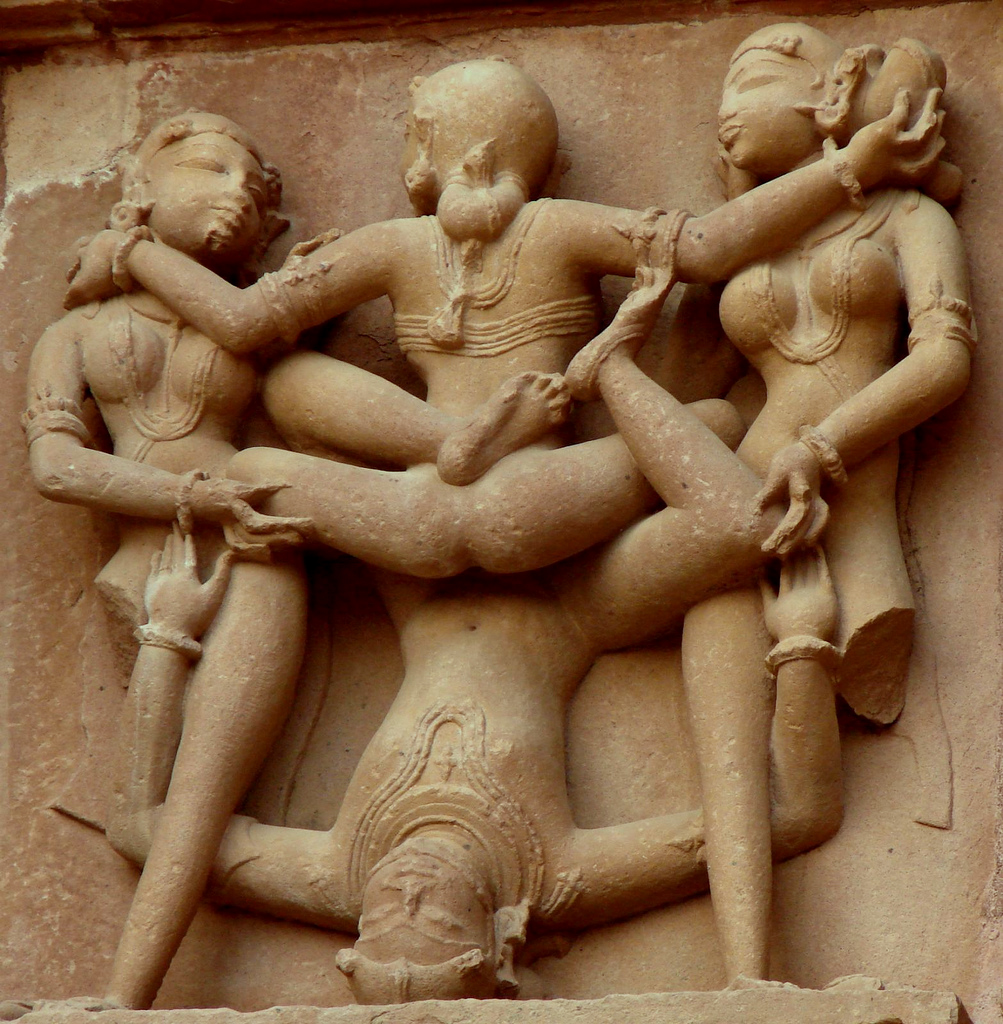
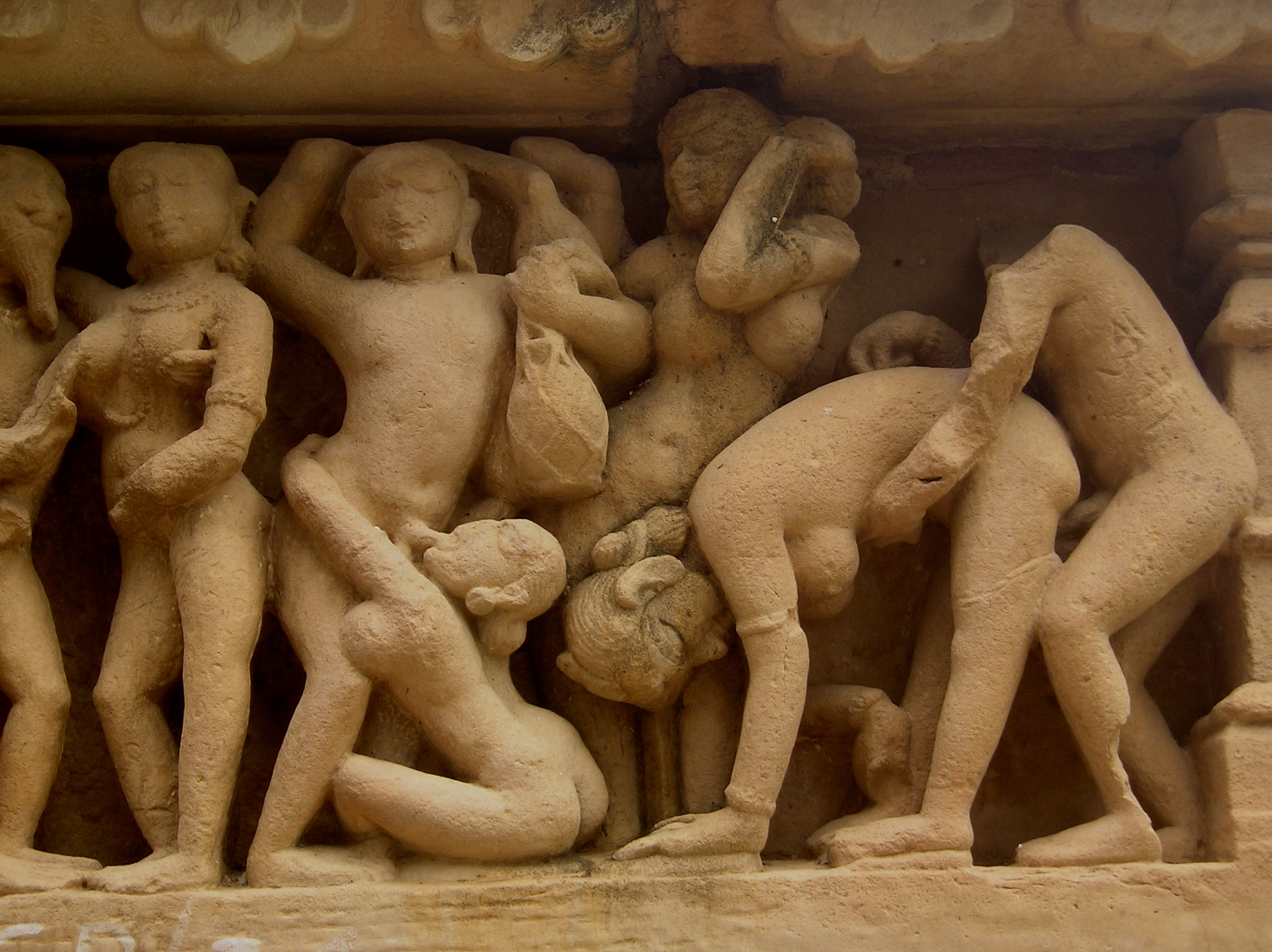
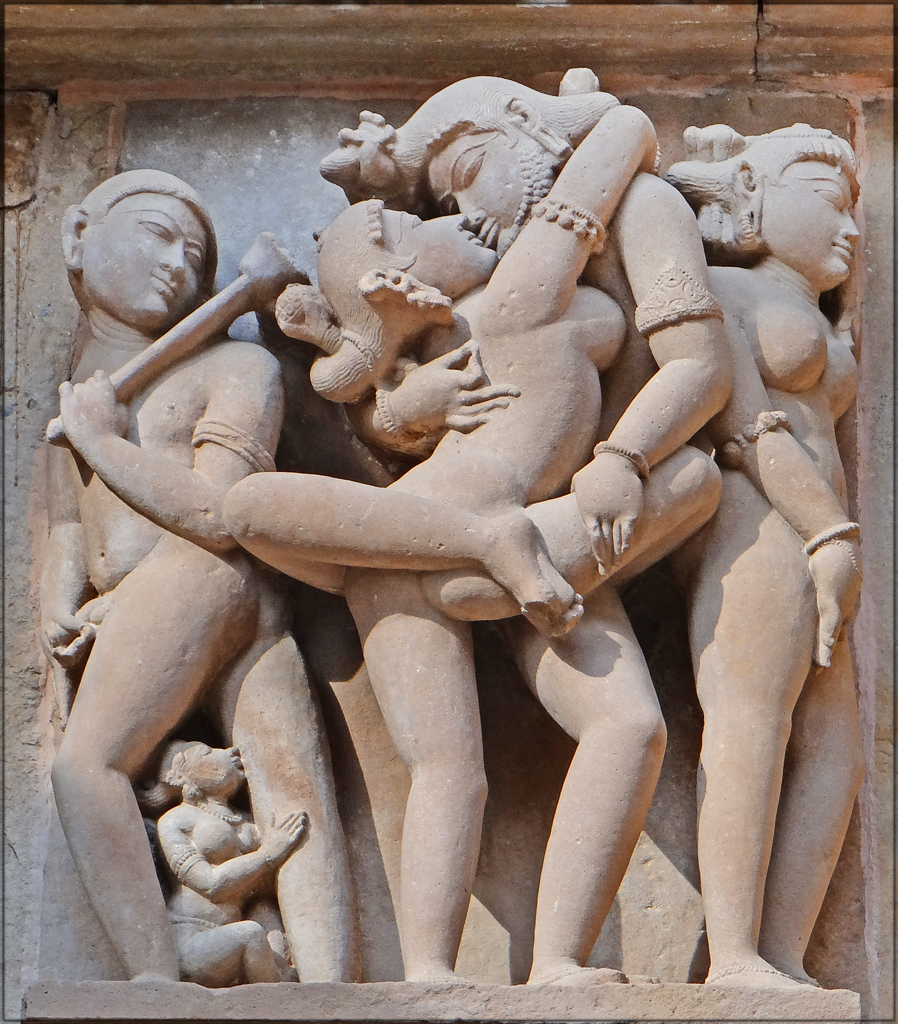
The Khajuraho temple complex is famous for its erotic carvings.

Human sexual activity is generally influenced by social rules that are culturally specific and vary widely.

Sexual ethics, morals, and norms relate to issues including deception/honesty, legality, fidelity and consent. Some activities, known as sex crimes in some locations, are illegal in some jurisdictions, including those conducted between (or among) consenting and competent adults (examples include sodomy law and adult–adult incest).

Some people who are in a relationship but want to hide polygamous activity (possibly of opposite sexual orientation) from their partner, may solicit consensual sexual activity with others through personal contacts, online chat rooms, or, advertising in select media.

Swinging involves singles or partners in a committed relationship engaging in sexual activities with others as a recreational or social activity. The increasing popularity of swinging is regarded by some as arising from the upsurge in sexual activity during the sexual revolution of the 1960s.

Some people engage in various sexual activities as a business transaction. When this involves having sex with, or performing certain actual sexual acts for another person in exchange for money or something of value, it is called prostitution. Other aspects of the adult industry include phone sex operators, strip clubs, and pornography.

=== Gender roles and the expression of sexuality ===
Social gender roles can influence sexual behavior as well as the reaction of individuals and communities to certain incidents; the World Health Organization states that, "Sexual violence is also more likely to occur where beliefs in male sexual entitlement are strong, where gender roles are more rigid, and in countries experiencing high rates of other types of violence." Some societies, such as those where the concepts of family honor and female chastity are very strong, may practice violent control of female sexuality, through practices such as honor killings and female genital mutilation.

Initiation of sexual activities by women was found to increase sexual satisfaction. The promotion of equality between men and women is considered crucial for attaining sexual and reproductive health according to the UN International Conference on Population and Development Program of Action:

"Human sexuality and gender relations are closely interrelated and together affect the ability of men and women to achieve and maintain sexual health and manage their reproductive lives. Equal relationships between men and women in matters of sexual relations and reproduction, including full respect for the physical integrity of the human body, require mutual respect and willingness to accept responsibility for the consequences of sexual behaviour. Responsible sexual behaviour, sensitivity and equity in gender relations, particularly when instilled during the formative years, enhance and promote respectful and harmonious partnerships between men and women."

=== Sexual abuse ===
Non-consensual sexual activity or subjecting an unwilling person to witnessing a sexual activity are forms of sexual abuse, as well as (in many countries) certain non-consensual paraphilias such as frotteurism, telephone scatophilia (indecent phonecalls), and non-consensual exhibitionism and voyeurism (known as "indecent exposure" and "peeping tom" respectively).

=== Prostitution and survival sex ===
People sometimes exchange sex for money or access to other resources. Work takes place under many varied circumstances. The person who receives payment for sexual services is known as a prostitute and the person who receives such services is referred to by a multitude of terms, such as being a client. Prostitution is one of the branches of the sex industry. The legal status of prostitution varies from country to country, from being a punishable crime to a regulated profession. Estimates place the annual revenue generated from the global prostitution industry to be over $100 billion. Prostitution is sometimes referred to as "the world's oldest profession". Prostitution may be a voluntary individual activity or facilitated or forced by pimps.

Survival sex is a form of prostitution engaged in by people in need, usually when homeless or otherwise disadvantaged people trade sex for food, a place to sleep, or other basic needs, or for drugs. The term is used by sex trade and poverty researchers and aid workers.

== Legal issues ==
There are many laws and social customs which prohibit, or in some way affect sexual activities. These laws and customs vary from country to country, and have varied over time. They cover, for example, a prohibition to non-consensual sex, to sex outside marriage, to sexual activity in public, besides many others. Many of these restrictions are non-controversial, but some have been the subject of public debate.

Most societies consider it a serious crime to force someone to engage in sexual acts or to engage in sexual activity with someone who does not consent. This is called sexual assault, and if sexual penetration occurs it may be called rape. The details of this distinction vary considerably among different legal jurisdictions. Also, what constitutes effective consent in sexual matters varies from culture to culture and is frequently debated. Laws regulating the minimum age at which a person can consent to have sex (age of consent) are frequently the subject of debate, as is adolescent sexual behavior in general. Some societies have forced marriage, where consent may not be required.

=== Same-sex laws ===
Many locales have laws that limit or prohibit same-sex sexual activity.

=== Sex outside marriage ===
In the West, sex before marriage is not illegal. There are social taboos and many religions condemn pre-marital sex. In many Muslim countries, such as Saudi Arabia, Pakistan, Afghanistan, Iran, Kuwait, Maldives, Morocco, Oman, Mauritania, United Arab Emirates, Sudan, and Yemen, any form of sexual activity outside marriage is illegal. Those found guilty, especially women, may be forced to wed the sexual partner, may be publicly beaten, or may be stoned to death. In many African and native tribes, sexual activity is not viewed as a privilege or right of a married couple, but rather as the unification of bodies and is thus not frowned upon.

Other studies have analyzed the changing attitudes about sex that American adolescents have outside marriage. Adolescents were asked how they felt about oral and vaginal sex in relation to their health, social, and emotional well-being. Overall, teenagers felt that oral sex was viewed as more socially positive amongst their demographic. Results stated that teenagers believed that oral sex for dating and non-dating adolescents was less threatening to their overall values and beliefs than vaginal sex was. When asked, teenagers who participated in the research viewed oral sex as more acceptable to their peers, and their personal values than vaginal sex.

=== Minimum age of sexual activity (age of consent) ===
The laws of each jurisdiction set the minimum age at which a young person is allowed to engage in sexual activity. This age of consent is typically between 14 and 18 years, but laws vary. In many jurisdictions, age of consent is a person's mental or functional age. As a result, those above the set age of consent may still be considered unable to legally consent due to mental immaturity. Many jurisdictions regard any sexual activity by an adult involving a child as child sexual abuse.

Age of consent may vary by the type of sexual act, the sex of the actors, or other restrictions such as abuse of a position of trust. Some jurisdictions also make allowances for young people engaged in sexual acts with each other.

=== Incestuous relationships ===
Most jurisdictions prohibit sexual activity between certain close relatives. These laws vary to some extent; such acts are called incestuous.

Incest laws may involve restrictions on marriage rights, which also vary between jurisdictions. When incest involves an adult and a child, it is considered to be a form of child sexual abuse.

== See also ==
- Child sexuality
- Erotic plasticity
- History of human sexuality
- Human female sexuality
- Human male sexuality
- Mechanics of human sexuality
- Orgasm control
- Orgastic potency
- Sociosexual orientation
- Transgender sexuality
