= Drugs and sexual desire =

Psychological effect of drug intake

Drugs and sexual desire is about sexual desire being manipulated through drugs from various approaches. Sexual desire is generated under the effects from sex hormones and microcircuits from brain regions. Neurotransmitters play essential roles in stimulating and inhibiting the processes that lead to libido production in both men and women. For instance, a positive stimulation is modulated by dopamine from the medial preoptic area in the hypothalamus and norepinephrine. At the same time, inhibition occurs when prolactin and serotonin are released for action.

Drugs acting on the above neurotransmitters can be used to upregulate or downregulate sexual desire due to diseased conditions. During drug development specialized for women, the Female Sexual Function Index-Desire Domain (FSFI-D) provides a reference measurement for researchers to evaluate recipients' responses and results. FSFI values allow researchers to monitor the change of sexual desire with a more solid definition, and at the same time, establish records for the U.S. Food and Drug Administration (FDA) to process applications for drug approval. Similarly, the Male Desire Scale (MDS) is used for men.

After evaluating symptom severity using the scales, patients are then prescribed different types of drugs. Flibanserin and bremelanotide were developed for raising sexual desire in women, whereas similar conditions in men are treated using medications for sexual dysfunction. On the other hand, down-regulation on libido comes in two approaches: a direct or an indirect mechanism. Multiple drugs from each category have been proven effective.

Marketized drugs have encountered market demands, also boosted personalized medication developments aiming at a broader range of recipients. Still, disease establishment dilemmas and FDA drug approvals give rise to ethical concerns, posing obstacles in the field's development.

== Drugs enhancing sexual desire ==
These drugs are expected to restore a normal libido in patients. Targeting acquired and generalized hypoactive sexual desire disorder (HSDD), improvement in sexual desire, and alleviation of psychological stress are to relieve the correlated symptoms. However, the treatments cannot cope with medically or psychiatrically related conditions, nor the effects from other medications.

=== Specialized to premenopausal women ===
==== Flibanserin ====
Chemical structure of flibanserin molecule.

Flibanserin is the first pharmaceutical product from Sprout Pharmaceuticals for premenopausal women with HSDD. The drug was approved by the FDA in 2015. It compiles a serotonin 5-HT_{1A} receptor agonist and a serotonin 5-HT_{2A} antagonist. and is an antidepressant that was originally developed for depression. This weak partial agonist that acts on dopamine D_{4} receptors, is also postsynaptic and functions by modulating various neurotransmitters, including dopamine, norepinephrine, and serotonin.

===== Pharmacodynamics =====
Flibanserin contains centrally active piperazine/benzimidazole-derived molecules, that aim to limit forskolin-stimulated cAMP production. Thus, eliminating the phosphatidyl-inositol turnover, which 5-HT stimulates typically in the brain cortex. However, the precise mechanism is oblique. It is estimated that the drug targets brain regions, especially in the medial prefrontal cortex, hypothalamus, limbic regions, and brainstem.

===== Efficacy =====
After its launch in 2015 and marketed as Addyi, the drug experienced controversies and rejection from being acknowledged after three reviews on the clinical trials. Regarding the eligible prescription criteria concluded from the trials, the patient should have a diagnosed psychological pathology, medical comorbidities, and the presence of personal relationship issues. Despite being the first drug, its efficacy was not significant for treatment less than at least four weeks. Treatment withdrawal is also practiced if recipients do not experience improvements in symptoms after eight weeks. Nevertheless, around 18% of the gain was observed after 24 weeks of treatment.

===== Adverse effects =====
Due to a wide range of observed side-effects, flibanserin's safety has been called into question. Clinical trials reported adverse reactions including dizziness, nausea, fatigue, and insomnia. Hypotension and central nervous system depression (somnolence) leading to sedation and sleepiness symptoms were also observed. In order to lower the chances of occurrence, the drug is usually prescribed to be taken only once per day before bed.

On the other hand, the third stage of the trial suggests that risks are derived from any moderate or strong cytochrome P450 CYP3A4 inhibitors that are often present in antihypertensive drugs, antiretroviral drugs, antibiotics, or fluconazole. An alcohol-interaction study was also carried out. Instead of premenopausal women, the study was on male participants, with the conclusion that alcohol may pose a risk of systolic and diastolic blood pressure reduction to recipients.

===== Pharmacokinetics =====
Flibanserin is delivered through oral administrations on a half-life of 11 hours. A steady state can be achieved after three days of treatment. The metabolites of the drug are predominantly eliminated through urination and defecation.

==== Bremelanotide ====
Chemical structure of bremelanotide.

Bremelanotide was first developed by Palatin Technologies, then out-licensed to AMAG Pharmaceuticals Inc. after its approval by the FDA on 21 June 2019. Marked as VyleesiTM, it was primarily designed for both men and women in the form of an intranasal formulation, particularly for treating male erectile dysfunction. However, the research was discontinued and focused on targeting female HSDD in a subcutaneous injection to increase bioavailability. Bremelanotide is usually injected a minimum of 45 minutes before sexual activity. Despite having identical prescription criteria as that of flibanserin, bremelanotide is not recommended for pregnant patients. No trial was tested on pregnant patients. Therefore, patients at childbearing ages are recommended to use contraception continuously during treatment and should discontinue once they become pregnant.

===== Pharmacodynamics =====
The melanocortin receptor agonist proposes to activate multiple receptor subtypes nonselectively, with the highest affinity with MC1R, then MC4R, MC3R, MC5R, and MC2R receptors. As MC4R receptors are present on neurons in the central nervous system, a function in modulating brain pathways is suggested, albeit a precise mechanism remains unknown.

===== Efficacy =====
Sustained and significant improvement in FSFI scores throughout a 52-week extension was attained, indicating a high efficacy of the drug treating HSDD, most notably when anticipating the challenge in psychological distress.

===== Adverse effects =====
Mild or moderate adverse events are common, expressing symptoms like nausea, facial flushing, headache, and sunburn. Unlike flibanserin, bremelanotide induces fewer side effects and is not affected nor develops severe complications with alcohol. However, the drug slows down gastric emptying, which can cause an impact on oral drug uptake and the subsequent drug effectiveness. As activation of MC1R gives rise to hyperpigmentation, treatment dosage is at a maximum of eight doses per month. Besides, to minimize the chances of cardiovascular complications, the prescribed daily dosage is at one dose.

===== Pharmacokinetics =====
Bremelanotide is exposed through a single subcutaneous administration. With a half-life of an hour, the drug is excreted through urine and faeces.

=== Specialized to men ===
Since HSDD in men is not acknowledged and was categorized to be a distinct sexual dysfunction, there are currently no drugs specialized for men in similar conditions as stated above.

== Drugs suppressing sexual desire ==
Drugs down-regulating libido are generally either intended for libido suppression via direct down-regulating mechanisms or eliciting such side-effects by their unintended indirect mechanisms.

=== Direct mechanism ===
Two types of drugs are mainly prescribed to people suffering from overwhelming sexual desire: gonadotropin-releasing hormone agonists (GnRH agonists) and steroidal anti-androgens.

Chemical structure of leuproelin, a commonly used GnRH agonist.

==== Gonadotropin-releasing hormone agonists ====
GnRH agonists are a group of drugs intended to activate GnRH receptors in the anterior pituitary gland. They are synthesized by replacing the sixth and tenth amino acids of the original gonadotropin-releasing peptide hormone. After the modification, they can bind to the GnRH receptors more strongly and are less degradable by enzymes when compared to the natural GnRH, making them more biologically active. GnRH agonists commonly used are leuprorelin, goserelin, and triptorelin, which are marked as Lupron, Zoladex, and Decapetyl, respectively. Nafarelin, marked as Synarel, is also occasionally prescribed in the form of nasal spray. These drugs are all approved by the US FDA, and their working principles target both sexes equally.

===== Pharmacodynamics =====
This class of drugs initially stimulates the anterior pituitary gland to secrete more GnRH, leading to a temporary surge in GnRH level in the circulation. Yet, because of the desensitization effect on the receptors upon continuous stimulation, in the long term, its secretion will be inhibited if continual medication is prescribed. Particularly, GnRH is essential for the release of gonadotropic hormones, such as LH and follicle-stimulating hormone (FSH), from the anterior pituitary-body. These hormones are responsible for the synthesis of steroid sex hormones (testosterone in men; progesterone and estrogen in women). Therefore, GnRH inhibition by these drugs, in turn, reduces the secretion of steroid sex hormones from the sex organs, eventually leading to libido suppression.

===== Efficacy =====
Many studies have shown that leuprorelin, goserelin and triptorelin are effective in suppressing sexual desires and increasing control against sex. Patients who were prescribed with these drugs have sexual thoughts less frequently and strongly.

===== Adverse effects =====
Common adverse effects elicited by these drugs include hot flushes, bone loss, headache, unpredictable mood changes, depression, vaginal dryness, or even atrophy for females and penile atrophy for males. These adverse effects can be counteracted and treated by add-back therapy, also known as hormone replacement therapy. People treated with GnRH agonists are suggested to undergo this therapy simultaneously by taking adequate progestin, vitamin D, and calcium supplement pills daily.

===== Pharmacokinetics =====
Gonadotropin-releasing hormone agonists are largely parenterally administered to the body, that is, via subcutaneous or intramuscular injection. At the same time, nafarelin is an exception in which its prescription is a nasal spray, and some may be implanted into fats. In general, their half-lives are approximately two to four hours. Some agonists are mainly excreted via urine while other agonists are mainly excreted via faeces.

==== Steroidal anti-androgens (Cyproterone acetate) ====
Chemical structure of cyproterone acetate.

Steroidal anti-androgens are a class of steroid drugs that inhibit the actions of androgens. Cyproterone acetate, a 17-hydroxyprogesterone acetate derivative, is a very potent one and is widely used. Though it is not approved by the US FDA owing to its toxicity, it has been approved by Canada and a plethora of countries in Europe with the brand name Androcur in the market. This drug mainly targets men due to its mechanism of action.

===== Pharmacodynamics =====
Cyproterone acetate suppresses libido by directly reducing the level of active androgen, testosterone, in males. The suppression of testosterone level results from its inhibition of the release of luteinizing hormone (LH) from the anterior section of the pituitary gland, interfering with testosterone production from the testes as LH stimulates testosterone production. It also blocks the conversion of testosterone to dihydrotestosterone for action. In addition to this mechanism, it also competes for the androgen receptors against testosterone and dihydrotestosterone, causing interference with the androgen-receptor interaction on the reproductive organ, thereby lowering sexual desire.

===== Efficacy =====
Cyproterone acetate has been proven effective in restraining sexual drive and fantasies in patients with high libido. Its usage in treating hypersexuality has been advocated by the World Federation of Societies of Biological Psychiatry (WFSBP).

===== Adverse effects =====
Common adverse effects of cyproterone acetate include depression, hepatotoxicity, dyspnea, change in body weight, hot flushes, sweating, fatigue, and gynaecomastia.

===== Pharmacokinetics =====
Cyproterone acetate is mainly orally administered to the body, and it has a half-life of 1.8 days. After metabolism, its metabolites are predominantly excreted via faeces.

=== Indirect mechanism ===
There are many types of drugs that unintentionally lower sexual desire through indirect mechanisms. It is one of their side-effects as the outcome of libido suppression is not intended. SSRIs reduce the re-uptake of serotonin back to the neurons, leading to an increase in serotonin level in the body. Due to the fact that serotonin can interfere with other neurotransmitters and hormones, for instance, sex hormones, SSRIs can therefore lower sexual desire.

Apart from SSRIs, other types of drugs that could lower sexual desire are not intended to suppress libido originally. Thus, sexually active people are suggested to avoid the usage of the following drugs:

- Antihypertensive drugs
- Anti-anxiety drugs (e.g. benzodiazepines)
- Antipsychotic drugs
- Anticonvulsants
- Non-steroidal anti-inflammatory drugs (e.g. Antihistamine)
- Opioid
- Medical marijuana
- Recreational drugs

== Future development ==
Postmenopausal women may also suffer from HSDD due to a decline in androgen production from menopause. A research proposed two combinations of drugs, each designed against the different causes of HSDD. One combination is to utilise sublingual testosterone with a 5-HT_{1A} receptor agonist to raise motivation for sex, by lifting the inhibition mechanisms in the brain's prefrontal regions. Testosterone is also proposed to be coupled with the PDE5 inhibitor, targeting an insensitive system for the production of sexual desire. As both clinical trials showed desirable results, this indicates the prosperity of further developing a single drug targeting HSDD for all women of different status, even though the FDA has not approved the two combinations.

== Ethical concerns ==
In fact, HSDD was defined shortly before the release of flibanserin to the market and its approval by the US FDA. This has brought up a controversy about whether it is appropriate and ethical to create a medical condition for the benefit of the sales of pharmaceutical products.

Apart from this ethical issue, there is a dilemma of whether a medical doctor should prescribe drugs to sexual offenders whose libido is subpar. On the one hand, it is considered unethical for doctors not to treat them as they are expected to treat patients indiscriminately. On the other hand, treating sexual offenders may impose a risk to society. Physicians have been struggling with this dilemma, and it is still difficult for them to make a choice at this moment in time.
