= Sex recession =

People having less sex

The sex recession, also known as the sexual recession, refers to a decline in sexual activity among adults, particularly among young adults. This phenomenon has been observed in various studies and research papers, and its causes and implications are still being debated.

Several studies have investigated the sex recession, including a 2021 study in the Journal of Sex and a 2019 study published by The Atlantic that found young adults in the United States are having less sex than previous generations. This trend has been observed in various countries, including Australia, Japan, France, and the United Kingdom.

== Causes ==
Some factors have been suggested as contributing to the possible sex recession, such as porn, cultural changes, work and financial stress, technology, and the COVID-19 pandemic.
