= Orgasm control =

Orgasm control can mean any of several sexual activities involving forcing, denying, postponing or extending orgasm, sometimes in combination:

- Forced orgasm, the forcing of an orgasm that is outside the recipient's voluntary control
- Orgasm denial, preventing the recipient from having orgasms
- Edging (sexual practice), postponing orgasm to achieve an ecstatic state
