= Dysorgasmia =

Pain after orgasm

Dysorgasmia is the experience of a painful orgasm, usually in the abdomen. The condition may be experienced during or after orgasm, sometimes as late as several hours after the orgasm occurred. People of any sex can experience orgasmic pain. The term is sometimes used interchangeably with painful ejaculation when experienced by a man, but ejaculatory pain is only a subtype of male dysorgasmia as men can experience pain without ejaculating. The phenomenon is poorly understood and underresearched. Dysorgasmia can come as a side effect of surgical interventions such as prostatectomy.

Primary dysorgasmia is when pain occurs every time a person orgasms, while secondary dysorgasmia is when a person has had non-painful orgasms before.

== Symptoms ==
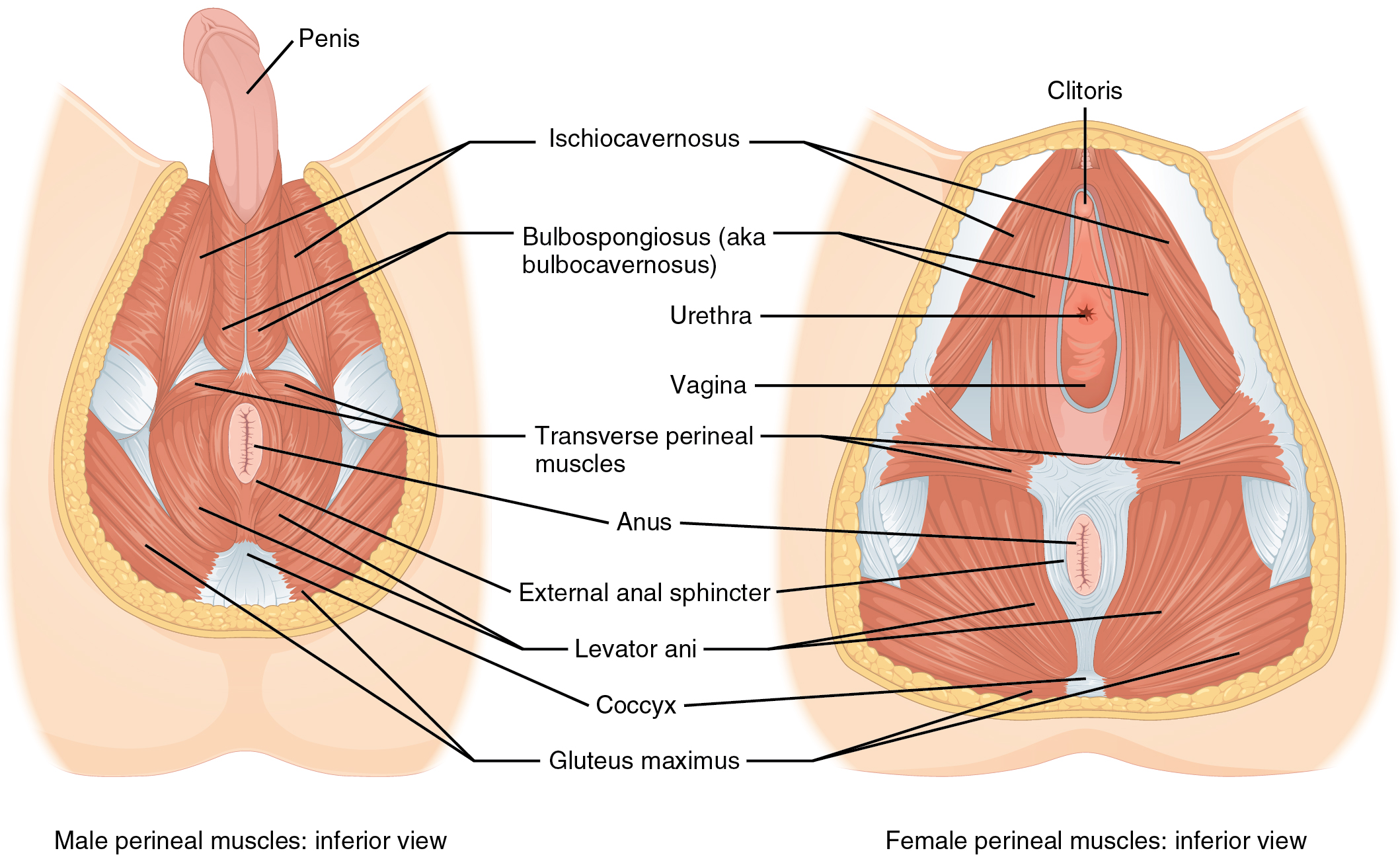
Diagram of the muscles in the male and female pelvic floor

The most common symptom of dysorgasmia is pain in the abdomen, pelvic floor, or genitals during or after orgasm. Though pain is typically in the pelvic region, there is at least one case of foot pain associated with orgasm. Other physical symptoms include headaches, fainting or almost fainting, loss of bladder or bowel control, nausea, vomiting, hyperventilation, constipation, and chills. Rarely, dysorgasmia can include thunderclap headaches, which may be an indication of a brain aneurysm. Dysorgasmia can also cause psychological symptoms such as confusion, anxiety, and insomnia. Symptoms usually only last for a few minutes, but have been recorded to last for hours or days after orgasm.

The pelvic pain associated with dysorgasmia is likely caused by spasms of the pelvic floor, while other symptoms may be caused by vasovagal-related blood pressure fluctuation.

== Causes ==
=== Drug-induced ===
Multiple psychiatric drugs can cause dysorgasmia as a side effect, including certain serotonin–norepinephrine reuptake inhibitors (SNRIs), selective serotonin reuptake inhibitors (SSRIs), tricyclic antidepressants (TCAs), and antipsychotics. Since TCAs partially block the Alpha-1 adrenergic receptors responsible for muscle contractions during orgasm and ejaculation, researcher W.M. Petrie theorized that they can cause painful spasms in these muscles.

Dysorgasmia can also be caused by birth control; one case was of a woman who began experiencing painful orgasms after switching to a new brand of contraceptive ring. The pain stopped once she was prescribed a third brand.

==== Drugs that can cause dysorgasmia ====
- Amoxapine
- Clomipramine
- Desipramine
- Fluoxetine
- Haloperidol
- Hypericum
- Imipramine
- Mesoridazine
- Sertraline
- Paroxetine
- Protriptyline
- Reboxitine
- Venlafaxine

=== Pelvic abnormalities ===
Endometriosis, especially on the pelvic muscles and vagina, can cause dysorgasmia. This is because sexual activity and orgasm can stress the misplaced endometrium-like tissue. Cysts may also cause dysorgasmia, as in the case of a young woman whose dysorgasmia was found to be caused by an urachal cyst. Ejaculatory duct obstructions have also been found to cause pain during orgasm.

Due to the contractions in the pelvic muscles that occur during orgasm, it is possible for any infection or abnormality in the pelvic area to cause dysorgasmia.

=== Prostatectomy ===
About 15% of people who have had a radical prostatectomy (RP) experience pain during or after orgasm. In one study, 78% of patients still experienced orgasmic pain six months after RP, 26% after eighteen months, and 8% after twenty-four months.

== See also ==
- Dyspareunia, pain during sex
- Postorgasmic illness syndrome
