= Adrenal gland disorder =

- Depiction of location of adrenal glands in human body.
- Specialty: Endocrinology

Adrenal gland disorders (or diseases) are conditions that interfere with the normal functioning of the adrenal glands. The body produces too much or too little of one or more hormones when one has an adrenal gland dysfunction. The underlying cause and the degree to which it affects hormone levels determine the severity of symptoms.

The adrenal gland produces hormones that affects growth, development and stress, and also helps to regulate kidney function. There are two parts of the adrenal glands, the adrenal cortex and the adrenal medulla. The adrenal cortex produces mineralocorticoids, which regulate salt and water balance within the body, glucocorticoids (including cortisol) which have a wide number of roles within the body, and androgens, hormones with testosterone-like function. The adrenal medulla produces epinephrine (adrenaline) and norepinephrine (noradrenaline).

== Tumors of the adrenal gland ==
=== Adrenal adenoma ===
Adrenal adenomas are benign tumors that start in the cortex of the adrenal gland. They fall into one of two categories: functional or non-secreting. Adenomas that are nonfunctional or have modest levels of hormone secretion may not show any symptoms at all and may remain asymptomatic. But adenomas with high levels of hormones frequently show up with primary hyperaldosteronism, Cushing syndrome, or hyperandrogenism symptoms.

=== Adrenocortical carcinoma ===
Adrenocortical carcinoma, (ACC), is cancer that develops in the adrenal glands' cortex, or outer layer. Adrenocortical carcinoma usually occurs randomly, independent of a genetic predisposition. The majority of patients' primary complaints at first are indications and manifestations of excess hormones. Due to local tumor growth, some patients have vague symptoms such as flank or abdominal pain, fullness in the abdomen, or early satiety.

=== Adrenal incidentaloma ===
An adrenal incidentaloma is a mass lesion larger than 1 cm in diameter that was unintentionally found through radiologic examination. In patients who do not yet have a confirmed cancer diagnosis, adrenal incidentaloma is infrequently caused by malignancy.

=== Pheochromocytoma ===
Pheochromocytoma originates from chromaffin cells and is a kind of neuroendocrine tumor. Pheochromocytomas are generally benign. 10% to 15% of pheochromocytomas have the potential to be cancerous.

== Hereditary disorders associated with adrenal tumors ==
=== Von Hippel–Lindau disease ===
Von Hippel–Lindau disease is a rare genetic multi-system disorder where certain body parts develop non-cancerous tumors. Pheochromocytomas are a particular kind of tumor that are linked to von Hippel-Lindau syndrome. VHL gene mutations result in von Hippel-Lindau syndrome.

=== Multiple endocrine neoplasia ===
Multiple endocrine neoplasia results in tumors or overgrowth on one or more endocrine glands. Multiple endocrine neoplasia is classified into three main forms: type 1, type 2, and type 4. Multiple endocrine neoplasia can be brought on by mutations in the MEN1, RET, and CDKN1B genes.

== Disorders of hormone over/under-production ==
=== Addison's disease ===
Addison's disease, or primary adrenal insufficiency, is an uncommon chronic illness characterized by insufficient production of cortisol and aldosterone by the adrenal glands. Chronic primary adrenal insufficiency is typically characterized by an extended period of malaise, fatigue, anorexia, weight loss, joint and back pain, and skin darkening. Mineralocorticoid and glucocorticoid hormone deficiency must be physiologically replaced in order to treat primary adrenal insufficiency.

=== Adrenal crisis ===
Adrenal crisis is a serious, life-threatening complication of adrenal insufficiency. Hypotension, or hypovolemic shock, is the main symptom of adrenal crisis, other indications and symptoms include weakness, anorexia, nausea, vomiting, fever, fatigue, abnormal electrolytes, confusion, and coma. Laboratory testing may detect lymphocytosis, eosinophilia, hyponatremia, hyperkalemia, hypoglycemia, and on occasion, hypercalcemia.

=== Adrenal insufficiency ===
Adrenal insufficiency is the clinical sign of insufficient glucocorticoid production or action, with or without concurrent insufficiency in mineralocorticoids and adrenal androgens. Adrenocorticotropic hormone deficiency or exogenous glucocorticoid or opioid medication suppression of adrenocorticotropic hormone can cause adrenal insufficiency, as can primary adrenal disorders. Unintentional weight loss, anorexia, postural hypotension, extreme exhaustion, muscle and abdominal pain, and hyponatraemia are characteristic clinical features.

=== Congenital adrenal hyperplasia ===
Congenital adrenal hyperplasia is a group of autosomal recessive disorders characterized by impaired cortisol synthesis. It results from the deficiency of one of the five enzymes required for the synthesis of cortisol in the adrenal cortex. Most of these disorders involve excessive or deficient production of hormones such as glucocorticoids, mineralocorticoids, or sex steroids, and can alter development of primary or secondary sex characteristics in some affected infants, children, or adults.

=== Cushing's disease ===
Cushing's disease is an illness where an excess of adrenocorticotropic hormone (ACTH) is released by the pituitary gland. Cushing syndrome can be brought on by Cushing disease.

=== Hyperaldosteronism ===
Hyperaldosteronism is caused by the adrenal gland's overproduction of the hormone aldosterone. The excess production of the adrenal gland, specifically the zona glomerulosa, is the cause of primary hyperaldosteronism. Excessive renin-angiotensin-aldosterone system activation results in secondary hyperaldosteronism.

=== Hypoaldosteronism ===
Hypoaldosteronism is a clinical condition marked by either an aldosterone deficiency or impaired tissue-level action of the hormone. Angiotensin I to Angiotensin II conversion, adrenal aldosterone synthesis and secretion, abnormal target tissue response to aldosterone, and renal renin production and secretion are all potential causes of the disorder.

== Notable people with adrenal gland disorders ==
- John F. Kennedy, the 35th president of the United States was diagnosed with Addison's disease.
- Some have suggested Jane Austen was an avant la lettre case of Addison's Disease, but others have disputed this.
- Scientist Eugene Merle Shoemaker, co-discoverer of the Comet Shoemaker-Levy 9 had Addison's Disease.

== See also ==
- Adrenalism
- Adrenal tumor
