= Aldosterone escape =

Physiologic phenomenon

Aldosterone Escape
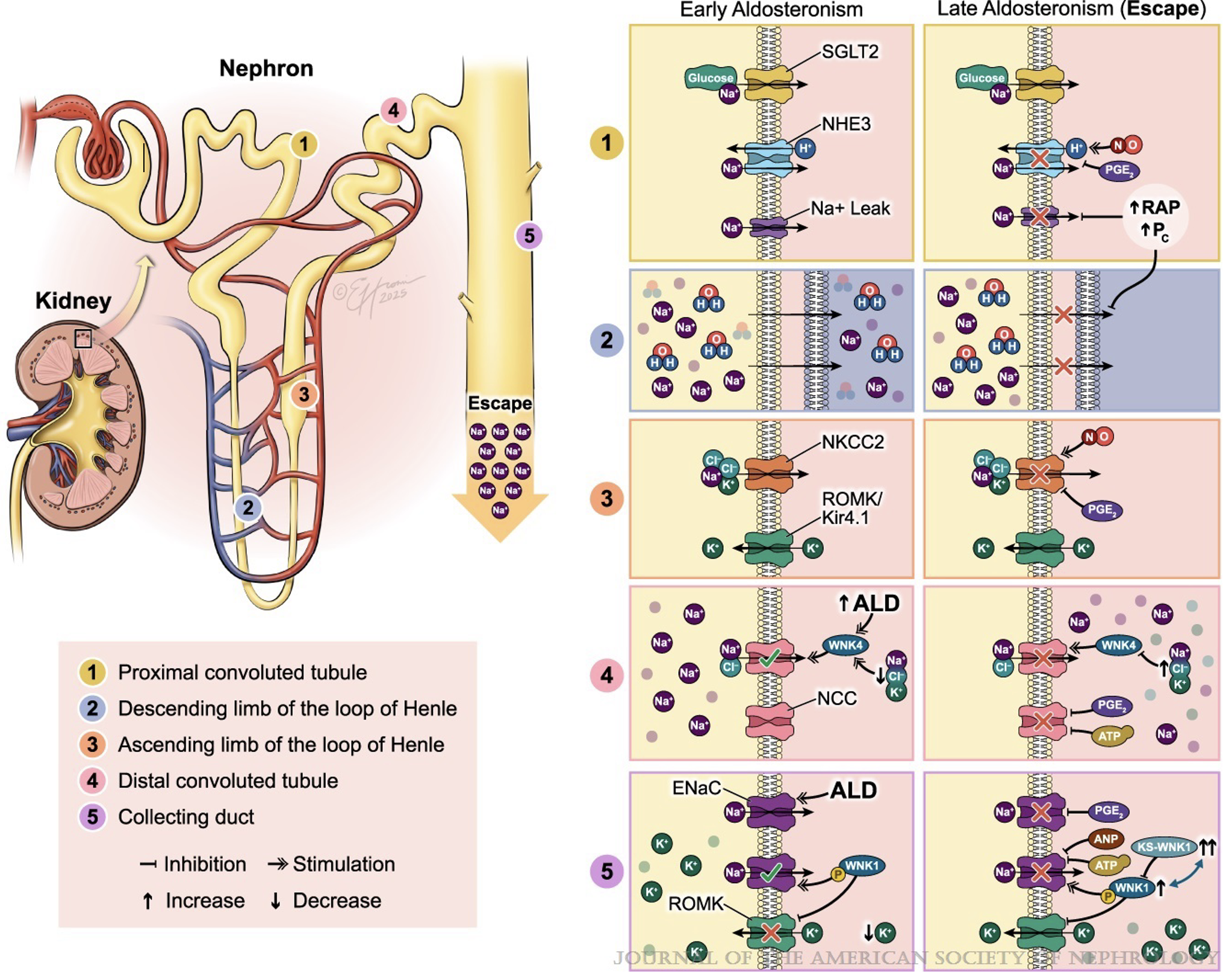
- Specialty: Nephrology, cardiology, internal medicine
- Diagnostic method: Clinical (presumptive)
- Treatment: Treat underlying hyperaldosteronsim

In physiology, aldosterone escape refers to the spontaneous and compensatory diuresis that occurs in primary aldosteronism to rebalance fluid homeostasis during conditions of sodium retention. Simply put, the body partially "escapes" from the effects of excess aldosterone in what appears to be a complex renal feedback mechanism.

Aldosterone escape is thought to explain the observation that patients chronically exposed to high levels of aldosterone may not display edema as might be expected. The precise mechanisms underpinning aldosterone escape are a subject of debate, though appear to rely somewhat on pressure natriuresis as well as processes in the distal nephron.

== History and terminology ==
The discovery of aldosterone escape is credited to J. Thomas August and colleagues who in 1958 noted that continuous aldosterone infusion did not lead to commensurate sodium retention in canine experiments. While aldosterone escape is classically thought to be most relevant in patients with adrenocortical adenomas (adrenal tumors autonomously producing excessive aldosterone), recent evidence suggests that rates of primary aldosteronism may be much higher than previously thought.

Before 2010, the term "aldosterone escape" had been used interchangeably in describing two distinct phenomena involving aldosterone that are exactly opposite each other:

1. Escape from the sodium-retaining effects of excess aldosterone (or other mineralocorticoids) in primary hyperaldosteronism.
2. The inability of ACE inhibitor therapy to reliably suppress aldosterone release, for example, in patients with heart failure or diabetes, usually manifested by increased salt and water retention; this latter phenomenon is now termed aldosterone breakthrough.

== Mechanisms ==
The exact mechanism(s) underpinning aldosterone escape are an active subject of research, though several mechanisms have been proposed.

Pressure natriuresis has been proposed as one driver of aldosterone escape, as Starling force backflow of Na^{+} and water into the tubules thus favors Na^{+} excretion. Normally, Na^{+} and water are reabsorbed from the tubules and dumped into the renal interstitium. From there, Starling forces dictate the gradient for movement of water and Na^{+} into the peritubular capillaries. Because hydrostatic pressures in the tubules, interstitium, and peritubular capillaries are normally equivalent, oncotic pressures govern flow. Typically, oncotic pressures are higher in the peritubular capillaries, because protein composition in the interstitium is negligible; therefore, Na^{+} and water leave the interstitial space and enter the capillaries. However, hyperadosteronism raises pressures in the peritubular capillaries. When hydrostatic pressures are raised in the peritubular capillaries, Starling forces begin to favor "backflow" of Na^{+} and water from the interstitium into the tubules—thus, increasing Na^{+} excretion. This is a proposed mechanism of aldosterone escape for how patients with increased levels of aldosterone are able to maintain Na^{+} balance and temporarily avoid an edematous state. Experiments isolating the perfusion pressures seen by glomerular capillaries from heightened systemic pressures due to hyperaldosteronism have shown that Na^{+} excretion remains minimal until the kidney is exposed to heightened perfusion pressures. These experiments brought about the proposition that initially high perfusion pressures due to increased Na^{+} and water reabsorption in a high aldosterone state actually causes backflow of Na^{+} and water into the tubules.

In addition to pressure natriuresis, recent evidence suggests that aldosterone escape involves synergistic processes including hormonal feedback, paracrine and purinergic signaling, the WNK system, and transporter regulation. Some have specifically suggested the involvement of decreased abundance of the thiazide-sensitive sodium-chloride co-transporter (NCC) which mediates sodium reabsorption in the distal tubule, though one should be cautious about emphasizing distal processes over proximal ones.

Notably, proposed mechanisms for this phenomenon do not include a reduced sensitivity of mineralocorticoid receptors to aldosterone, because low serum potassium is often seen in these patients, which is the direct result of aldosterone-induced expression of ENaC channels. Furthermore, electrolyte homeostasis is maintained in these patients, which excludes the possibility that other Na^{+} transporters elsewhere in the kidney are being shut down. If, in fact, other transporters such as the Na^{+}-H^{+} antiporter in the proximal tubule or the Na^{+}/K^{+}/2Cl^{−} symporter in the thick ascending loop of Henle were being blocked, other electrolyte disturbances would be expected, such as seen during use of diuretics.
