= Primary aldosteronism =

Excess production of aldosterone in the adrenal gland

- Other names: Primary hyperaldosteronism, Conn's syndrome
- Aldosterone
- Specialty: Endocrinology
- Symptoms: High blood pressure, poor vision, headaches, muscular weakness, muscle spasms
- Complications: Stroke, myocardial infarction, kidney failure, abnormal heart rhythms
- Usual onset: 30 to 50 years old
- Causes: Enlargement of both adrenal glands, adrenal adenoma, adrenal cancer, familial hyperaldosteronism
- Diagnostic method: Blood test for aldosterone-to-renin ratio
- Treatment: Surgery, spironolactone, eplerenone, low salt diet
- Frequency: 10% of people with high blood pressure

Primary aldosteronism (PA), also known as primary hyperaldosteronism, is the excess production of the hormone aldosterone from the adrenal glands, resulting in low renin levels and high blood pressure. This abnormality is a paraneoplastic syndrome (i.e. caused by hyperplasia or tumors). About 35% of the cases are caused by a single aldosterone-secreting adenoma, a condition known as Conn's syndrome.

Many patients experience fatigue, potassium deficiency and high blood pressure which may cause poor vision, confusion or headaches. Symptoms may also include: muscular aches and weakness, muscle spasms, low back and flank pain from the kidneys, trembling, tingling sensations, dizziness/vertigo, nocturia and excessive urination. Complications include cardiovascular disease such as stroke, myocardial infarction, kidney failure and abnormal heart rhythms.

Primary hyperaldosteronism has a number of causes. About 33% of cases are due to an adrenal adenoma that produces aldosterone, and 66% of cases are due to an enlargement of both adrenal glands. Other uncommon causes include adrenal cancer and an inherited disorder called familial hyperaldosteronism. PA is underdiagnosed; the Endocrine Society recommends screening people with high blood pressure who are at increased risk, while others recommend screening all people with high blood pressure for the disease. Screening is usually done by measuring the aldosterone-to-renin ratio in the blood (ARR) whilst off interfering medications and a serum potassium over 4, with further testing used to confirm positive results. While low blood potassium is classically described in primary hyperaldosteronism, this is only present in about a quarter of people. To determine the underlying cause, medical imaging is carried out.

Some cases may be cured by removing the adenoma by surgery after localization with adrenal venous sampling (AVS). A single adrenal gland may also be removed in cases where only one is enlarged. In cases due to enlargement of both glands, treatment is typically with medications known as aldosterone antagonists such as spironolactone or eplerenone. Other medications for high blood pressure and a low salt diet, e.g. DASH diet, may also be needed. Some people with familial hyperaldosteronism may be treated with the steroid dexamethasone.

Primary aldosteronism has been recognized as a common cause of secondary hypertension, accounting for approximately 10% of the hypertensive population. It occurs more often in women than men. Often, it begins in those between 30 and 50 years of age. Conn's syndrome is named after Jerome W. Conn (1907–1994), an American endocrinologist who first described adenomas as a cause of the condition in 1955.

== Signs and symptoms ==
People often have few or no symptoms. They may get occasional muscular weakness, muscle spasms, tingling sensations, or excessive urination. High blood pressure, manifestations of muscle cramps (due to hyperexcitability of neurons secondary to low blood calcium), muscle weakness (due to hypoexcitability of skeletal muscles secondary to hypokalemia), and headaches (due to low blood potassium or high blood pressure) may be seen.

Secondary hyperaldosteronism is often related to decreased cardiac output, which is associated with elevated renin levels.

== Causes ==
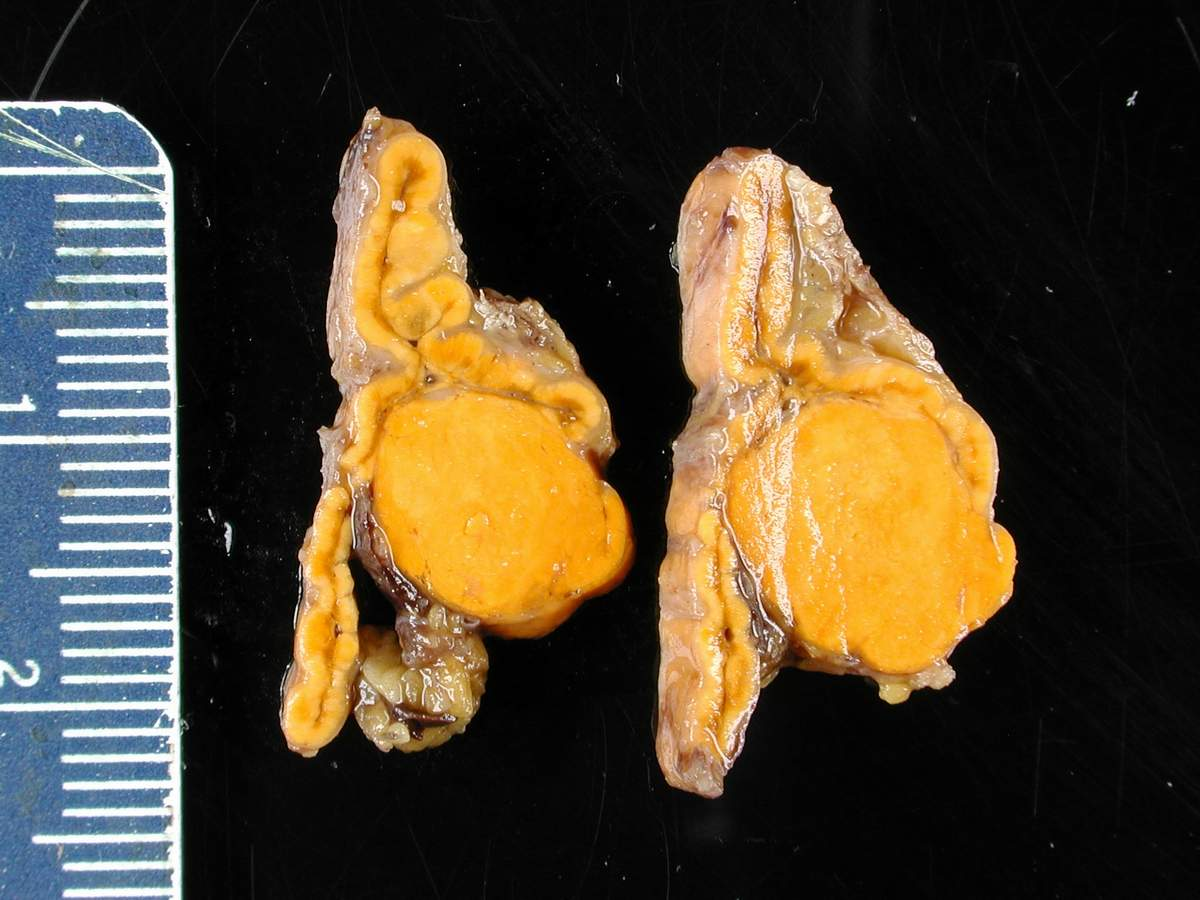
Two slices of an adrenal gland with a cortical adenoma, from a person with Conn's syndrome

The condition is due to:

- Bilateral idiopathic (micronodular) adrenal hyperplasia: 66% of cases
- Adrenal adenoma (Conn's disease): 33% of cases
- Primary (unilateral) adrenal hyperplasia: 2% of cases
- Aldosterone-producing adrenocortical carcinoma: <1% of cases
- Familial Hyperaldosteronism (FH)
  - Glucocorticoid-remediable aldosteronism (FH type I): <1% of cases
  - FH type II (APA or IHA): <2% of cases
- Ectopic aldosterone-producing adenoma or carcinoma: < 0.1% of cases

=== Genetics ===
40% of people with an adrenal aldosterone producing adenoma have somatic gain-of-function mutations in a single gene (KCNJ5). This gene is mutated in inherited cases of early onset primary aldosteronism and bilateral adrenal hyperplasia, albeit less frequently. These mutations tend to occur in young women with the adenoma in the cortisol secreting zona fasciculata. Adenomas without this mutation tend to occur in older men with resistant hypertension.

Other genes commonly mutated in aldosterone producing adenomas are ATP1A1 ATP2B3, CACNA1D, and CTNNB1.

== Pathophysiology ==
Aldosterone has effects on most or all cells of the body but, clinically, the most important actions are in the kidney, on cells of the late distal convoluted tubule and medullary collecting duct. In the principal cells aldosterone increases activity of basolateral membrane sodium-potassium ATPase and apical epithelial sodium channels, ENaC, as well as potassium channels, ROMK. These actions increase sodium reabsorption while potassium and proton (H^{+}) are secreted. Since more sodium is reabsorbed than potassium secreted, it also makes the lumen more electrically negative, causing chloride to follow sodium. Water then follows sodium and chloride by osmosis. In Conn syndrome, these actions cause increased extracellular sodium and fluid volume and reduced extracellular potassium. Aldosterone also acts on intercalated cells to stimulate an apical proton ATPase, causing proton secretion that acidifies urine and alkalizes extracellular fluid.

In summary, hyperaldosteronism causes hypernatremia, hypokalemia, and metabolic alkalosis.

Finer notes on aldosterone include the fact that it stimulates sodium-potassium ATPase in muscle cells, increasing intracellular potassium and also increases sodium reabsorption all along the intestine and nephron, possibly due to widespread stimulation of sodium-potassium ATPase. Finally, epithelial cells of sweat gland ducts and distal colon surface respond exactly the same as the principal cells of the nephron. These responses are important in climate adaptation and as a cause of constipation with elevated aldosterone.

The sodium retention leads to plasma volume expansion and elevated blood pressure. The increased blood pressure will lead to increased glomerular filtration rate and cause a decrease in renin released from the granular cells of the juxtaglomerular apparatus in the kidney decreasing sodium reabsorption and returning sodium renal excretion to near normal levels allowing sodium to 'escape' the effect of mineralocorticoids (also known as aldosterone escape mechanism in primary hyperaldosteronism also contributed to by increased ANP level). If there is primary hyperaldosteronism, the decreased renin (and subsequent decreased angiotensin II) will not lead to a decrease in aldosterone levels (a very helpful clinical tool in diagnosis of primary hyperaldosteronism).

== Diagnosis ==
Screening may be considered in people with high blood pressure presenting with low blood potassium, high blood pressure that is difficult to treat, other family members with the same condition, or a mass on the adrenal gland.

Measuring aldosterone alone is not considered adequate to diagnose primary hyperaldosteronism. Rather, both renin and aldosterone are measured, and a resultant aldosterone-to-renin ratio (ARR) is used for case detection. A high aldosterone-to-renin ratio suggests the presence of primary hyperaldosteronism. The diagnosis is made by performing a saline suppression test, ambulatory salt loading test, or fludrocortisone suppression test.

Measuring sodium and potassium concentrations simultaneously in serum and urine specimens has been suggested for screening purposes. Calculating the serum sodium over urinary sodium to serum potassium over urinary potassium (SUSPUP) and the (serum sodium to urinary sodium to (serum potassium)^{2} (SUSPPUP) ratios delivers calculated structure parameters of the RAAS, which may be used as a static function test. Its results have to be confirmed by calculating the ARR.

If primary hyperaldosteronism is confirmed biochemically, CT scanning or other cross-sectional imaging can confirm the presence of an adrenal abnormality, possibly an adrenal cortical adenoma (aldosteronoma), adrenal carcinoma, bilateral adrenal hyperplasia, or other less common changes. Imaging findings may ultimately lead to other necessary diagnostic studies, such as adrenal venous sampling, to clarify the cause. It is not uncommon for adults to have bilateral sources of aldosterone hypersecretion in the presence of a nonfunctioning adrenal cortical adenoma, making adrenal venous sampling (AVS) mandatory in cases where surgery is being considered. For cases where AVS is unable to provide lateralisation of the source/sources of aldosterone hypersecretion, radionuclide imaging such as NP-59 scintigraphy, or PET/CT with ^{11}C-Metomidate is an option. Since ^{11}C-Metomidate is unspecific for CYP11B1/CYP11B2 the patient needs pre-treatment with dexamethasone to downregulate the expression of CYP11B1.

The diagnosis is best accomplished by an appropriately-trained subspecialist, though primary care providers are critical in recognizing clinical features of primary aldosteronism and obtaining the first blood tests for case detection.

=== Classification ===
Some people only use Conn's syndrome for when it occurs due to an adrenal adenoma (a type of benign tumor). In practice, however, the terms are often used interchangeably, regardless of the underlying physiology.

=== Differential diagnosis ===
Other causes of treatment-resistant hypertension include renal artery stenosis, secondary hyperaldosteronism, pheochromocytoma, deoxycorticosterone- or renin-secreting tumors, and kidney ischemia. Excess consumption of licorice can inhibit 11β-hydroxysteroid dehydrogenase and cause similar symptoms as PA. Chrétien syndrome, Gitelman syndrome, and Liddle syndrome can cause secondary aldosteronism or pseudohyperaldosteronism.

== Treatment ==
The treatment for hyperaldosteronism depends on the underlying cause. In people with a single benign tumor (adenoma), surgical removal (adrenalectomy) may be curative. This is usually performed laparoscopically, through several very small incisions. For people with hyperplasia of both glands, successful treatment is often achieved with spironolactone or eplerenone, drugs that block the aldosterone receptor. With its antiandrogen effect, spironolactone drug therapy may have a range of side effects in males and females, including gynecomastia and irregular menses. These symptoms occur less frequently with eplerenone drug therapy.

In the absence of treatment, individuals with hyperaldosteronism often have poorly controlled high blood pressure, which may be associated with increased rates of stroke, heart disease, and kidney failure. With appropriate treatment, the prognosis is considered good.

Esaxerenone, the first non-steroidal mineralocorticoid blocker, was approved in 2019 in Japan to treat essential hypertension. Finerenone, a drug belonging to the same class, reached phase 3 clinical trial in 2020, but is not yet considered for hypertension. More importantly, next-generation Aldosterone Synthase Inhibitors have entered the research pipeline with CIN-107 undergoing Phase 2 clinical trial as of 2021

== Epidemiology ==
In the past, the prevalence of primary aldosteronism was considered to be less than 1% of patients with hypertension. More recent studies have reported much higher prevalence of primary aldosteronism, up-to 12.7% in primary care and to 29.8% in referral centers. Very low rates of compliance with screening guidelines lead to the underdiagnoses of primary aldosteronism.

== Society and culture ==
The Primary Aldosteronism Foundation is a patient-driven initiative committed to creating the paradigm shift that will lead to optimum diagnosis and treatment of primary aldosteronism by raising awareness, fostering research, and providing support to patients and healthcare professionals worldwide.

== Eponym ==
Conn's syndrome is named after Jerome W. Conn (1907–1994), the American endocrinologist who first described the condition at the University of Michigan in 1955.
