= Jerome W. Conn =

American endocrinologist (1907-1994)

- Born: September 24, 1907; New York, New York
- Died: June 11, 1994 (aged 86); Naples, Florida
- Education: University of Michigan (M.D., 1932)
- Known for: Conn syndrome
- Awards: Gairdner Foundation International Award (1965)
- Scientific career
- Fields: Endocrinology
- Workplaces: University of Michigan
- Doctoral advisor: Louis H. Newburgh

Jerome W. Conn (September 24, 1907 – June 11, 1994) was an American endocrinologist best known for his description of Conn syndrome or primary hyperaldosteronism.

== Biography ==
Conn was born in New York City. He studied for three years at Rutgers University before he entered the University of Michigan Medical School at Ann Arbor in 1928. The Great Depression of 1929 made it hard for his family to support his education, but his sisters managed to pay for it with their salaries.

He graduated with honors in 1932 and started an internship in surgery before switching to internal medicine. Conn worked at the Division of Clinical Investigation where he worked under Louis H. Newburgh on the relationship between obesity and non-insulin dependent diabetes mellitus. Conn proved that normal carbohydrate tolerance could be reached in twenty of twenty-one subjects when they reached normal weight. He became fellow in 1935 and assistant professor in 1938.

From 1943 Conn took on the Division of Endocrinology and started an investigation concerning acclimatization of military personnel to warm climates like in the South Pacific. He discovered that the excretion of sodium in sweat, urine and saliva was curtailed in these circumstances.

At the Presidential address to the Society of Clinical Research Conn presented a thirty-four-year-old patient complaining of episodic weakness of the lower legs, almost to paralysis, with periodic muscle spasms and cramps in her hands for a total period of seven years. After extensive research he had found a condition he called primary hyperaldosteronism, later called Conn syndrome. There were elevated levels of aldosterone in her circulation, coming from a hormone producing adrenal adenoma.

Conn wrote a total of 284 articles and book chapters and was recognized as a tutor stimulating others in research. His clinic was leading for years after in research on hyperaldosteronism.

Conn was honored by being named L. H. Newburgh Distinguished University Professor in 1968. There were many other honors during his career; he was member of twelve national professional societies.

His retirement was in 1974. He died in Naples, Florida.
