= Iodocholesterol =

Chemical compound

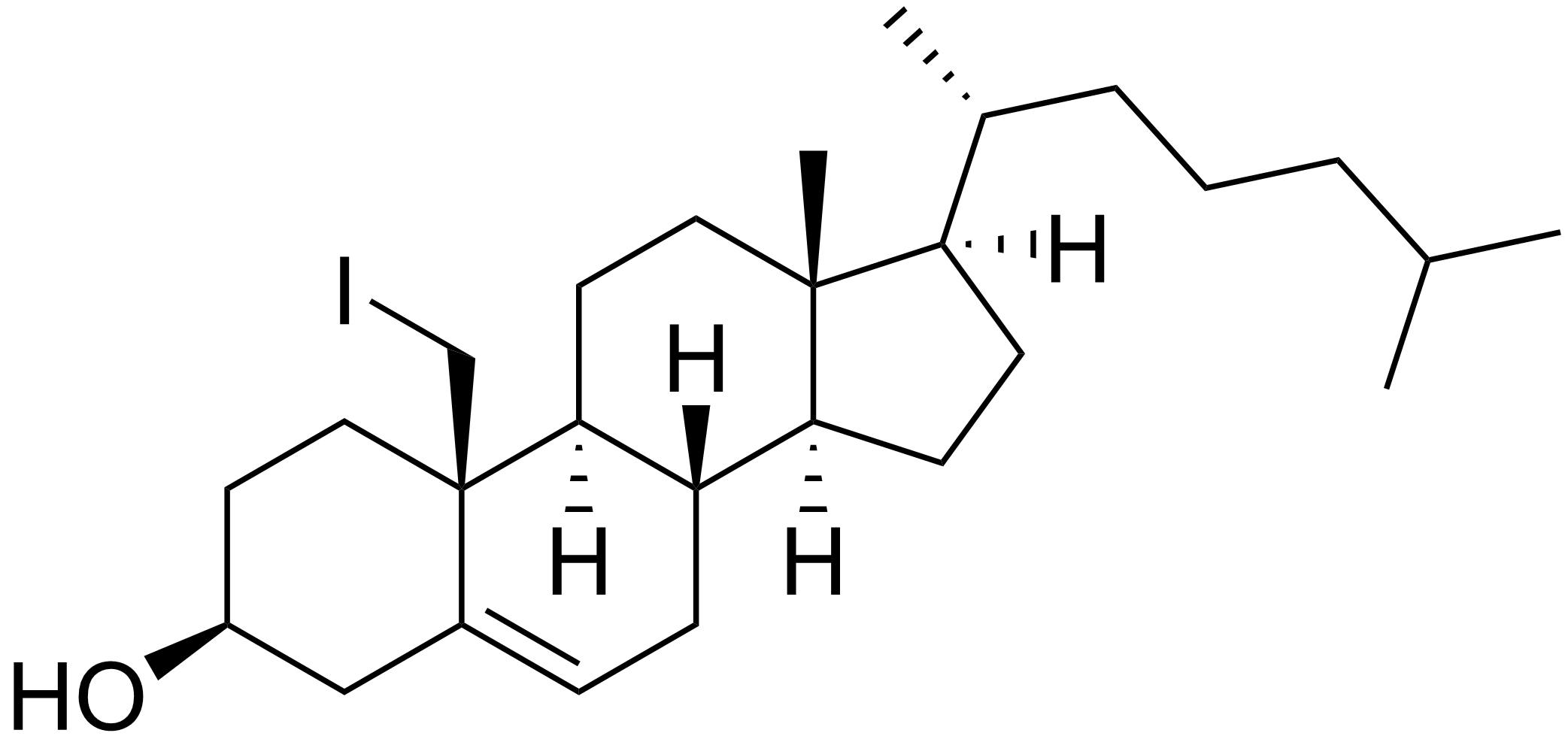

Clinical data
- Other names: Iodocholesterol; 19-Iodocholesterol; Iodocholesterol (^{131}I); 19-Iodocholest-5-en-3β-ol
- ATC code: V09XA02 (WHO) (^{131}I)

Identifiers
- IUPAC name: (3S,8S,9S,10S,13R,14S,17R)-10-(iodomethyl)-13-methyl-17-[(2R)-6-methylheptan-2-yl]-2,3,4,7,8,9,11,12,14,15,16,17-dodecahydro-1H-cyclopenta[a]phenanthren-3-ol
- CAS Number: 37414-03-2
- PubChem CID: 3032874
- ChemSpider: 20086815
- UNII: 4A4E6EXB6U
- CompTox Dashboard (EPA): DTXSID80190857
- ECHA InfoCard: 100.048.618

Chemical and physical data
- Formula: C_{27}H_{45}IO
- Molar mass: 512.560 g·mol^{−1}
- 3D model (JSmol): Interactive image
- SMILES: CC(C)CCC[C@@H](C)[C@H]3CC[C@H]2[C@@H]4C\C=C1\C[C@@H](O)CC[C@]1(CI)[C@H]4CC[C@@]23C
- InChI: InChI=1S/C27H45IO/c1-18(2)6-5-7-19(3)23-10-11-24-22-9-8-20-16-21(29)12-15-27(20,17-28)25(22)13-14-26(23,24)4/h8,18-19,21-25,29H,5-7,9-17H2,1-4H3/t19-,21+,22+,23-,24+,25+,26-,27-/m1/s1; Key:FIOAEFCJGZJUPW-FTLVODPJSA-N

Iodocholesterol, or 19-iodocholesterol, also as iodocholesterol (^{131}I) (INN) and NP-59, is a derivative of cholesterol with an iodine atom in the C19 position and a radiopharmaceutical. When the iodine atom is a radioactive isotope (iodine-125 or iodine-131), it is used as an adrenal cortex radiotracer in the diagnosis of patients suspected of having Cushing's syndrome, hyperaldosteronism, pheochromocytoma, and adrenal remnants following total adrenalectomy.
