= Adrenocortical adenoma =

Benign tumor of the adrenal gland

Adrenocortical Adenoma
- Other names: Adrenal cortical adenoma, adrenal adenoma
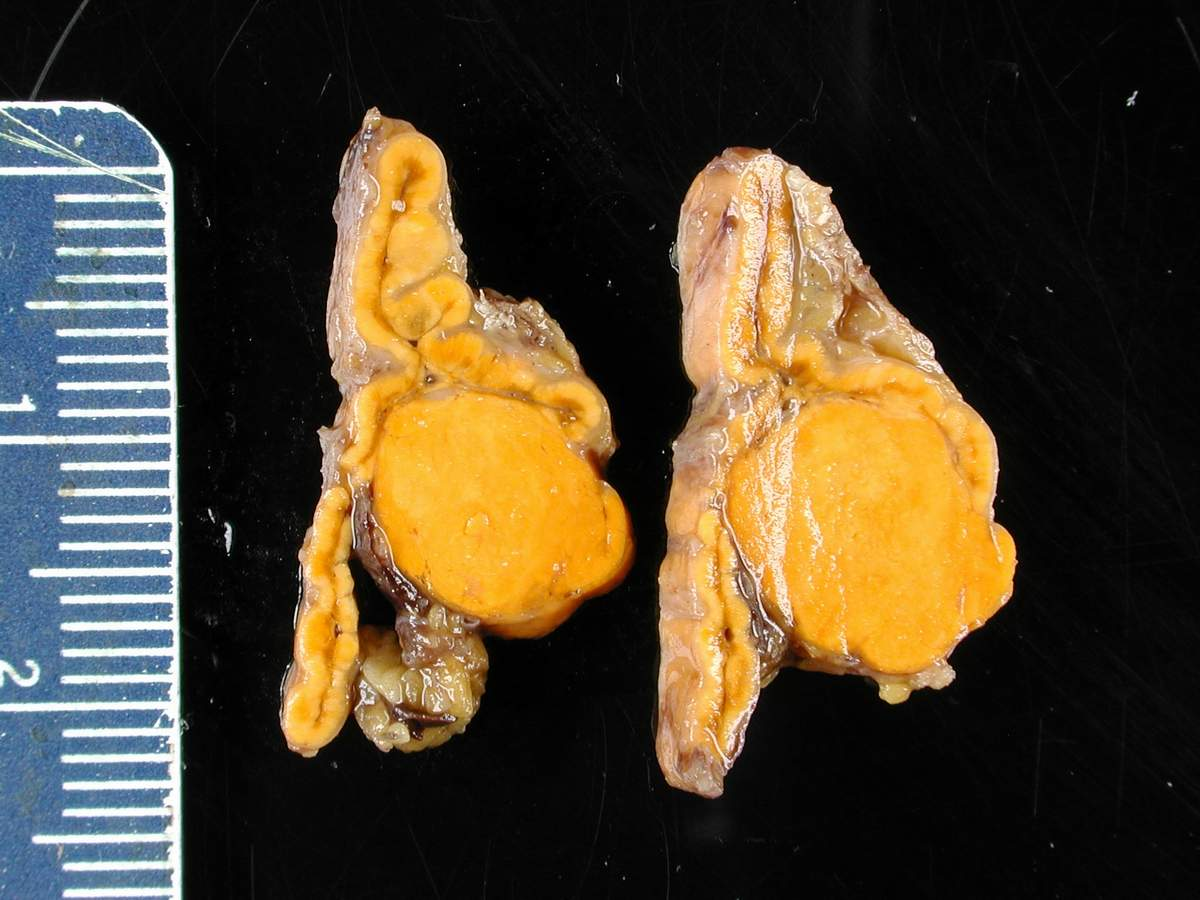
- Adrenal adenoma in a patient with Conn syndrome
- Specialty: Endocrinology, oncology

An adrenocortical adenoma or adrenal adenoma is commonly described as a benign neoplasm emerging from the cells that comprise the adrenal cortex. Like most adenomas, the adrenocortical adenoma is considered a benign tumor since the majority of them are non-functioning and asymptomatic. Adrenocortical adenomas are classified as ACTH-independent disorders, and are commonly associated with conditions linked to hyperadrenalism such as Cushing's syndrome (hypercortisolism) or Conn's syndrome (hyperaldosteronism), which is also known as primary aldosteronism. In addition, recent case reports further support the affiliation of adrenocortical adenomas with hyperandrogenism or florid hyperandrogenism which can cause hyperandrogenic hirsutism in females.

"Cushing's syndrome" differs from the "Cushing's disease" even though both conditions are induced by hypercortisolism. The term "Cushing's disease" refers specifically to "secondary hypercortisolism" classified as "ACTH-dependent Cushing's syndrome" caused by pituitary adenomas. In contrast, "Cushing's syndrome" refers specifically to "primary hypercortisolism" classified as "ACTH-independent Cushing's syndrome" caused by adrenocortical adenomas.

== Presentation ==
Hypercortisolism
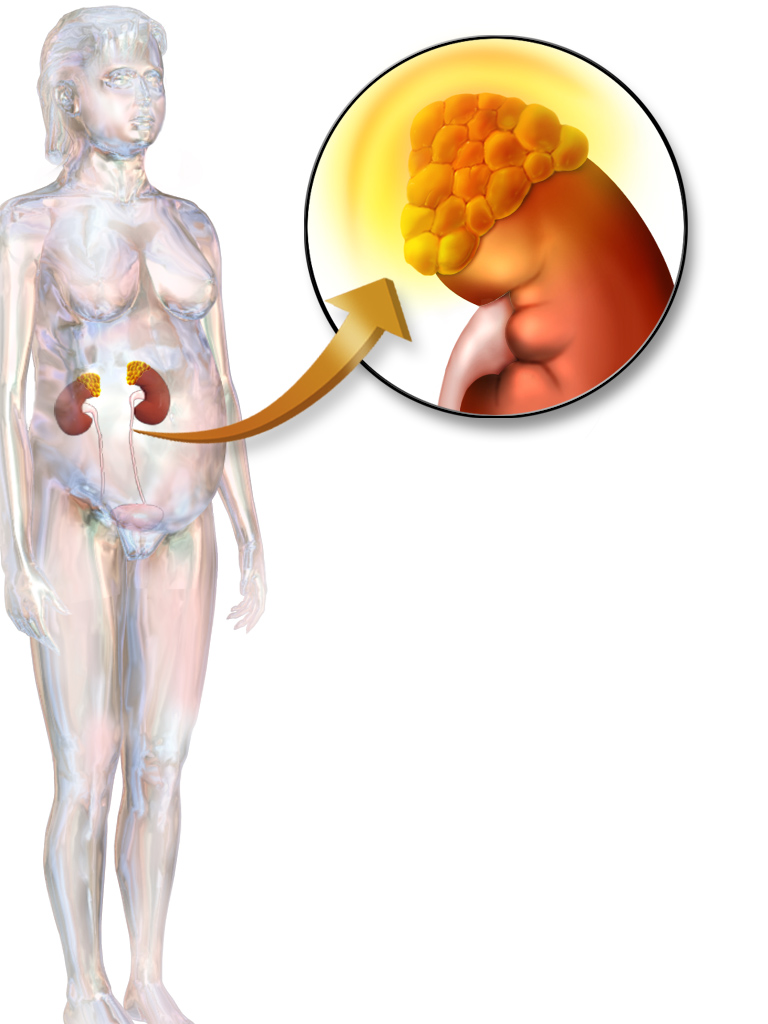
- Specialty: Endocrinology, oncology
- Symptoms: Adrenal Lesion

Adrenal adenomas are often categorized as endocrine-inactive tumors considering that majority of them are non-functioning and asymptomatic. Functional adrenocortical adenomas demonstrate symptoms consistent with mixed endocrine syndromes. In most reported cases of adrenocortical adenoma, patients have presented with one or multiple endocrine syndromes such as hyperaldosteronism/Conn's Syndrome, hypercortisolism/Cushing's syndrome, hyperandrogenism/feminization, virilization, or hirsutism. Some of the common symptoms associated with adrenocortical adenomas include:

Musculoskeletal

- Osteopenia
- Muscle weakness/muscle atrophy

Cardiovascular

- Hypertension

Endocrine and Metabolic

- Obesity

→More prevalent in males

- virilization

→More prevalent in females

- Hyperandrogenism
- Irregular menstrual cycles

Neuropsychological

- Sleep disorders
- Depression

Skin

- Easy bruising
- Stretch marks
- Hirsutism
- Acne

== Cause ==
Adrenal Glands Zonations
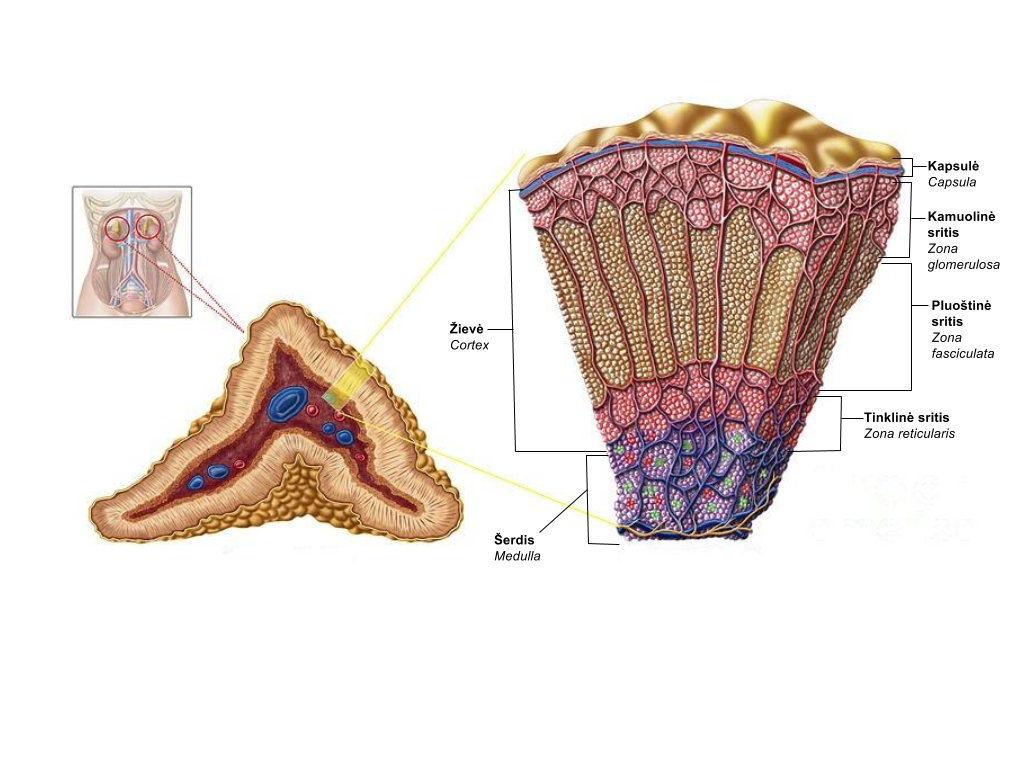
- Specialty: Endocrinology, oncology

Adrenal Glands Zonations
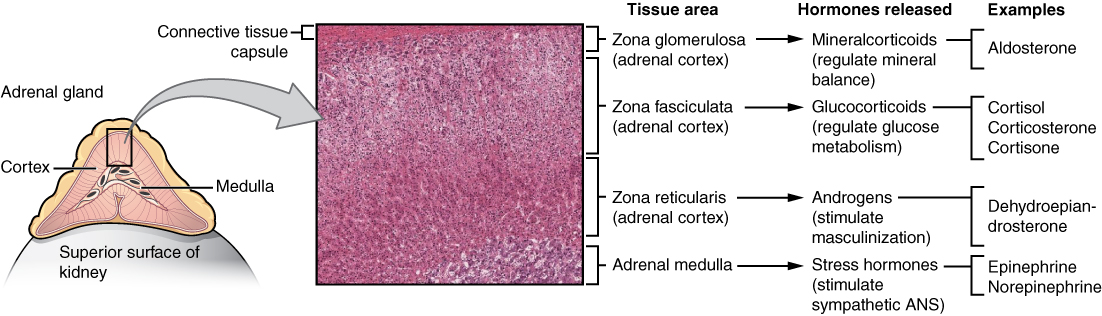
- Specialty: Endocrinology, oncology

Study of the reported cases indicate that most adrenocortical adenomas occur due to neoplastic proliferation of adrenal cortical cells within the three distinct layers of adrenal cortex. In humans, the adrenal cortex comprises three concentric zones including the zona glomerulosa, zona fasciculata, and zona reticularis that under normal conditions respond to body's physiological demands for steroid hormones. The adrenal cortex is considered a dynamic organ in which senescent cells are replaced by newly differentiated cells. This constant renewal facilitates organ remodeling which contributes to dynamic characteristics of the adrenal cortex. correspondingly, the developmental physiology of the adrenal cortex is believed to play a pivotal role in formation of the adrenocortical tumors. Hence, the molecular mechanisms involved in normal development of the adrenal glands are like double edged swords that can lead to the formation of tumors within the adrenal cortex. Moreover, recent studies suggest that mutations affecting the molecular pathways of the adrenocortical region can stimulate abnormal proliferation and tumor formation. Through these studies, the cyclic AMP-dependent protein kinase A signaling has been identified as a key mediator of cortisol secretion, and the mutations associated with the dysregulation of cyclic AMP – protein kinase A pathways have been implicated in the adrenocortical pathophysiology.

== Pathophysiology ==
If functional, adrenocortical adenomas can affect the normal activities of the adrenal cortex. Located within the adrenal glands are the three zones that are responsible for secretion of the three major classes of adrenal steroids. Hence, functional adrenocortical adenomas can induce over-secretion of adrenal steroids associated with pure or mixed endocrine syndromes, a condition commonly known as hyperadrenalism.

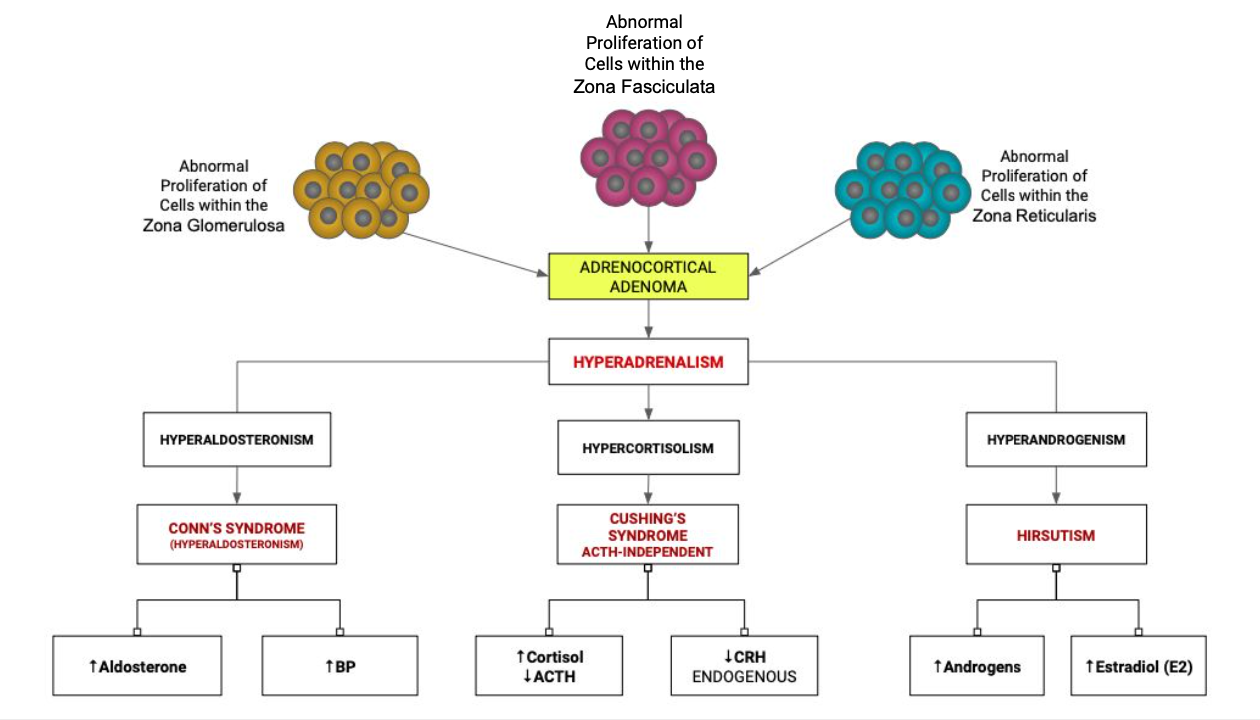

== Diagnosis ==
Due to their asymptomatic nature, most reported cases of adrenal adenomas have been discerned fortuitously through autopsy, or during medical imaging, particularly CT scan (computed tomography) and magnetic resonance imaging. Hence, they have earned the title incidentaloma referring to small adenoma discovered incidentally. Though adrenocortical adenomas are considered challenging to differentiate from the normal adrenal cortex, they appear as well-circumscribed lesions once isolated.

Imaging Diagnostics

- Computed Tomography (CT scan)
- Magnetic Resonance Imaging (MRI)
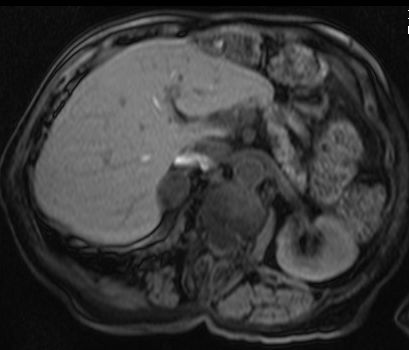

Adrenal-dedicated CT and MRI imaging can be performed to distinguish benign adenomas from potentially malignant lesions. Online calculators assist radiologists in calculating the washout of contrast in adrenal nodules on CT and chemical shift on MRI.

Laboratory Tests

- CRH Stimulation Test
- High-dose dexamethasone suppression test

=== Gross Description ===
- Well-circumscribed lesion
- Size ≤ 5 cm
- Weight ≤ 50 grams
- often appear as golden-yellow color mass

(may have focal dark regions corresponding to hemorrhage, lipid-depletion, and increased lipofuscin)

== Histopathology ==
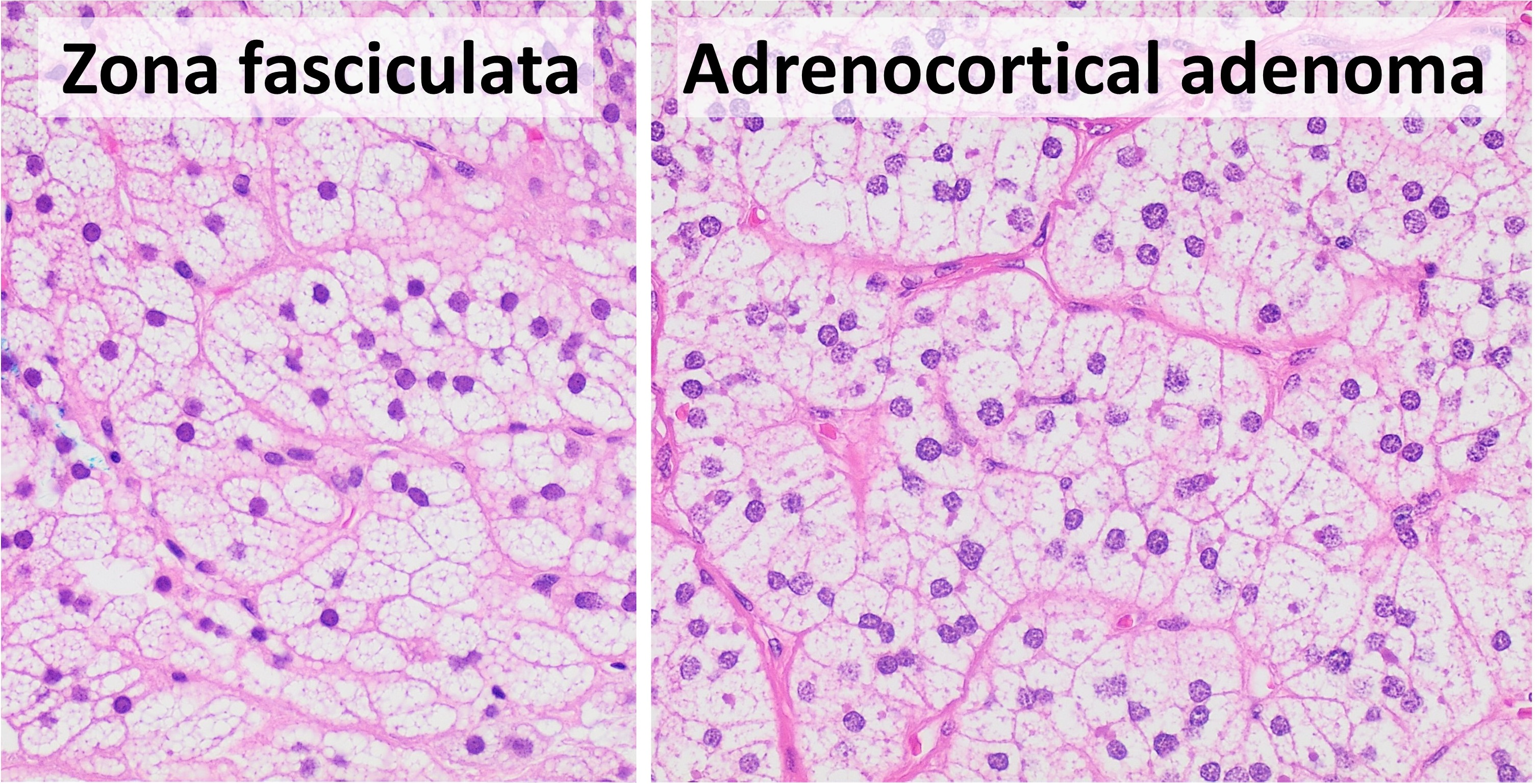
Zona fasciculata versus adrenocortical adenoma. An adrenocortical adenoma typically has mild changes in comparison, including larger cells with larger and more pleomorphic nuclei with more coarse chromatin. H&E stain.

The microscopic histopathology analysis of the tissue samples obtained from the adrenal cortex of individuals presenting with adenoma-associated symptoms such as primary aldestronism (PA) indicates that adenoma cells are relatively larger with different cytoplasm, and increased variation in nuclear size. This indication is based on comparison between the healthy (normal) and affected (adenoma-associated) adrenal cortex tissue samples.

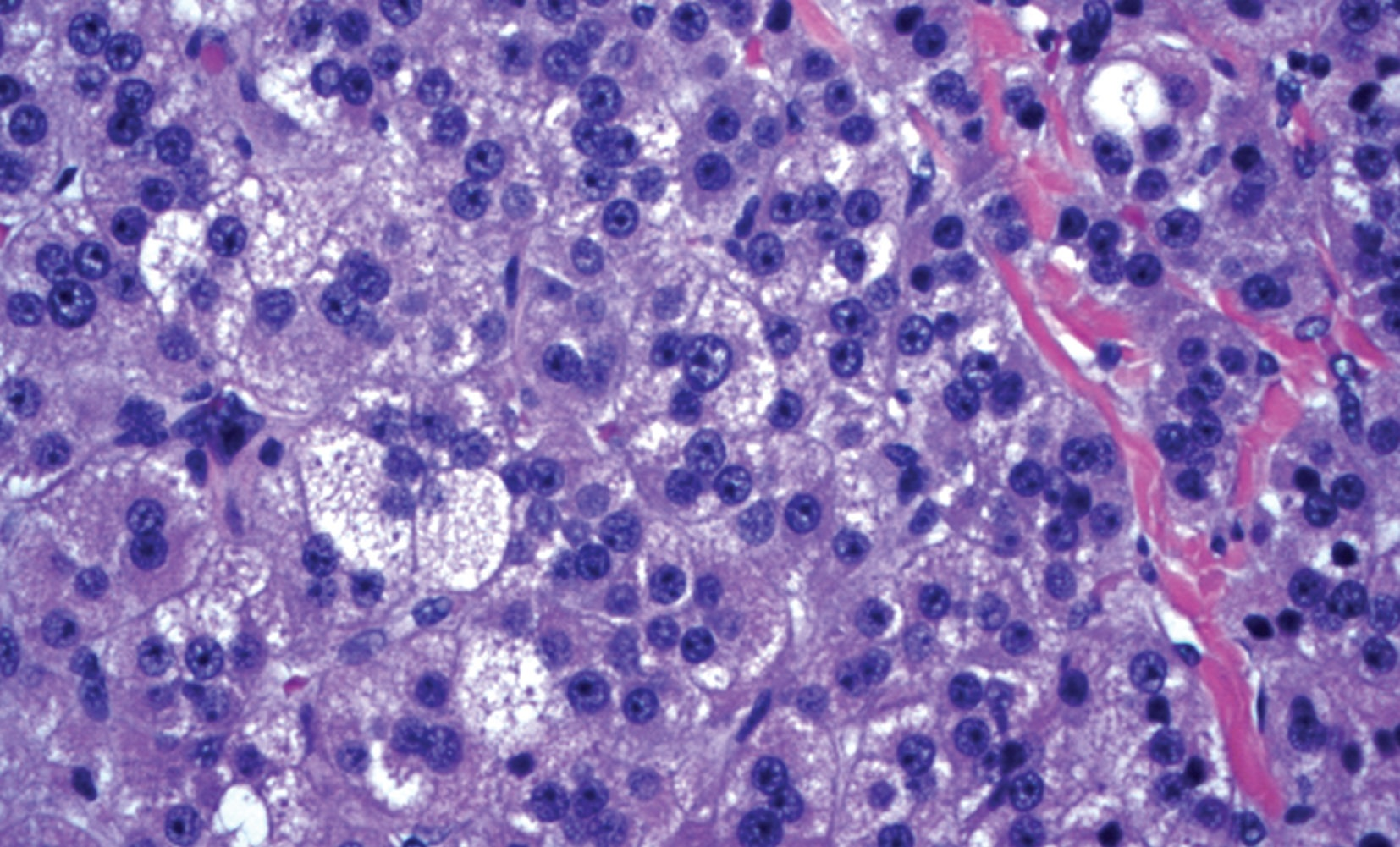
Adrenocortical adenoma with focal high grade nuclear atypia

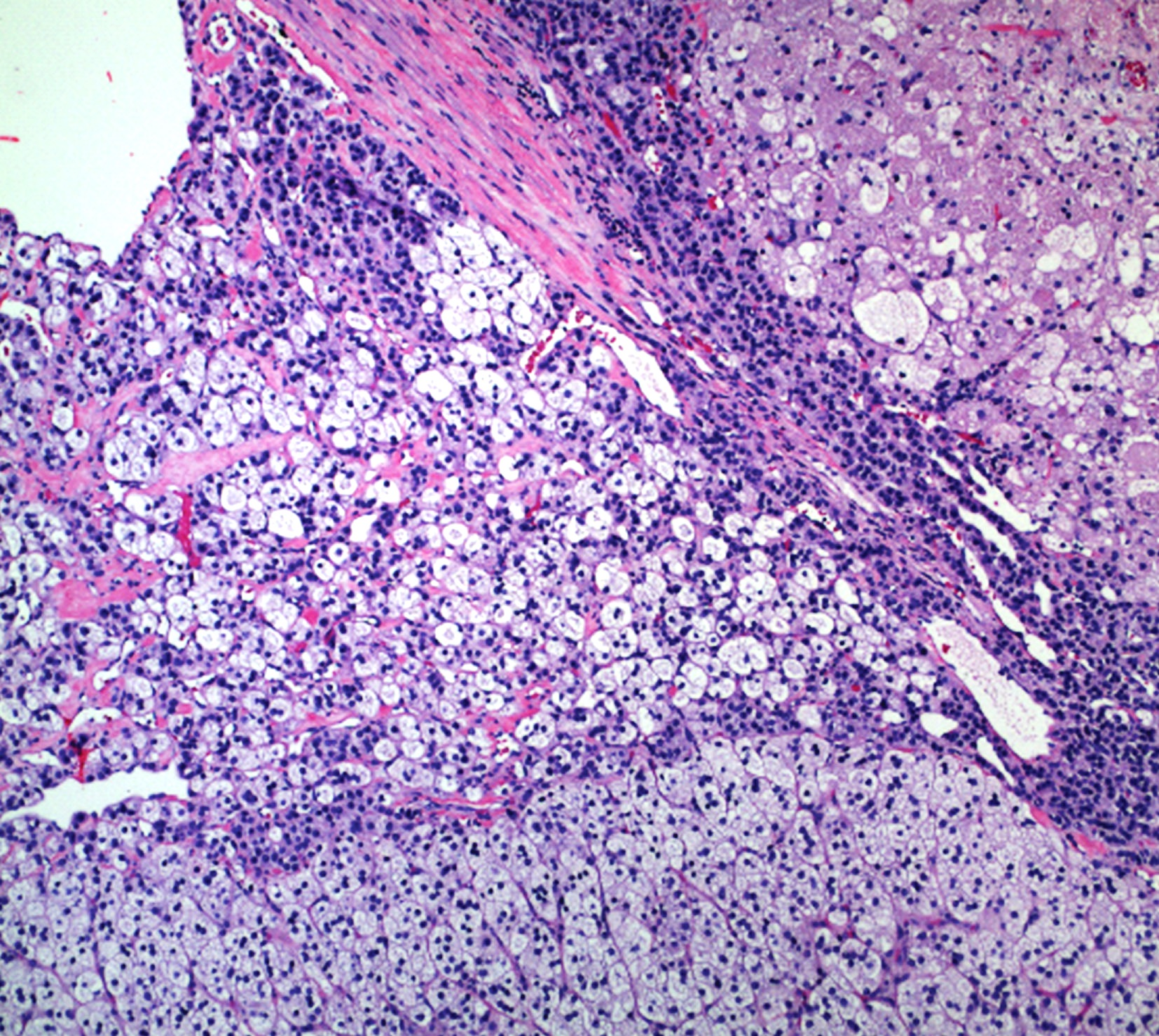
Adrenocortical adenoma with focal necrosis

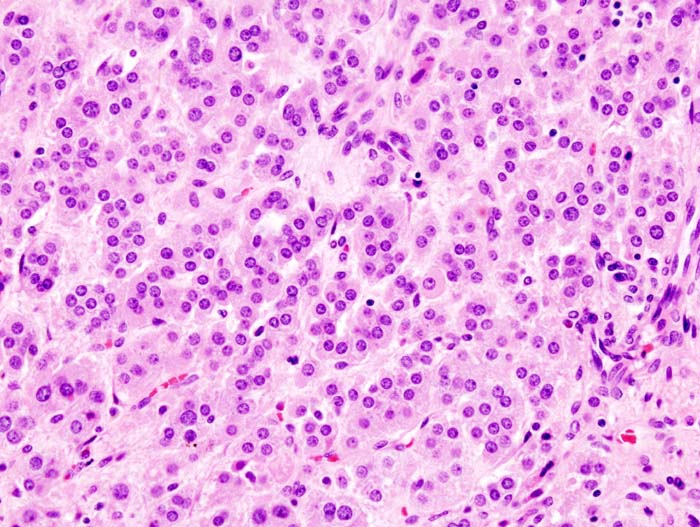

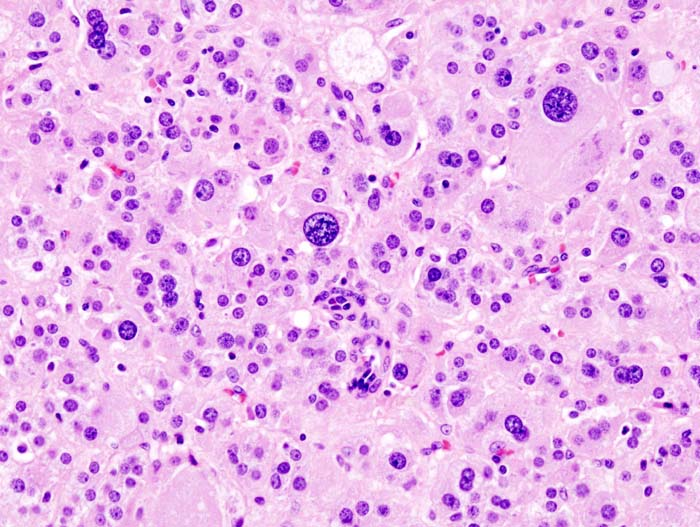

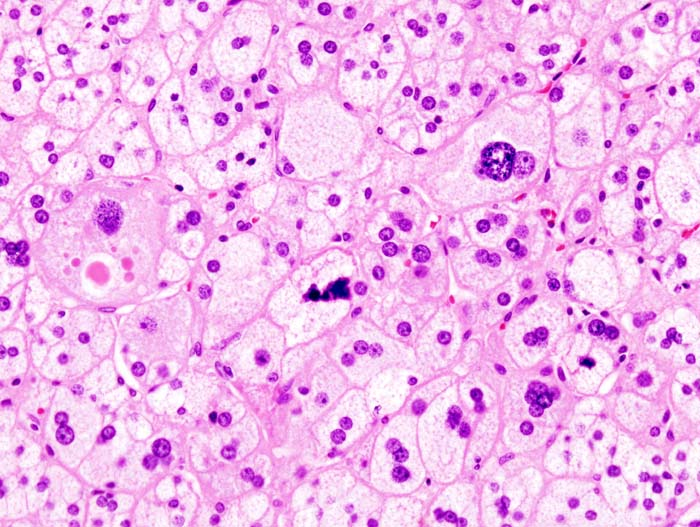

Adrenocortical adenomas are most commonly distinguished from adrenocortical carcinomas (their malignant counterparts) by the Weiss system, as follows:

Characteristic	Score
High nuclear grade (enlarged, oval to lobated, with coarsely granular to hyperchromatic chromatin and easily discernible, prominent nucleoli)	1
More mitoses than 5/50 high power fields	1
Atypical mitoses	1
Eosinophilic cytoplasm in >75% of tumor cells	1
Diffuse architecture of >33% of tumor	1
Necrosis	1
Venous invasion	1
Sinusoidal invasion (no smooth muscle in wall)	1
Capsular invasion	1

Total score indicates:

- 0–2: Adrenocortical adenoma
- 3: Undetermined
- 4–9: Adrenocortical carcinoma

== Treatment ==
- Non-functioning cases of adrenocortical adenoma can be managed through long-term followups and monitoring.
- The treatment approach for the functioning cases of adrenocortical adenoma depends on the type of disorders they induce and their advancement. Surgical excision may be required if its presence is resulting in atrophy of the adrenal glands and the surrounding tissues.

In order to acquire better treatment strategies, it is important to further examine, study and discern the distinct molecular mechanisms involved in the formation of endogenous Adrenal Adenomas, hyperplasias, and ACTH-independent Cushing's Syndrome to improve the available diagnostic and prognostic markers that can assist clinicians in the management and advance-treatment of such conditions.

A 2018 Cochrane Systematic review compared two different types of surgery: laparoscopic retroperotenial adrenalectomy and laporoscopic transperitoenal adrenelectomy in different types of adrenal tumors. Laparoscopic retroperotenial adrenalectomy appeared to reduce late morbility, time to oral fluid or food intake and time to ambulation, when compared to laparoscopic transperitoenal adrenalectomy. However there was uncertainty in these findings due to low-quality evidence, as well as inconclusive findings about effects of either surgery on all-cause mortality, early morbidity, socioeconomic effects, duration of surgery, operative blood loss, conversion to open surgery.

== Prognosis ==
- The long-term outlook for individuals diagnosed with non-functional adrenocortical adenoma is usually excellent.
- The long-term outlook for individuals diagnosed with functional adrenocortical adenoma is good with early diagnosis and treatment.

== Epidemiology ==
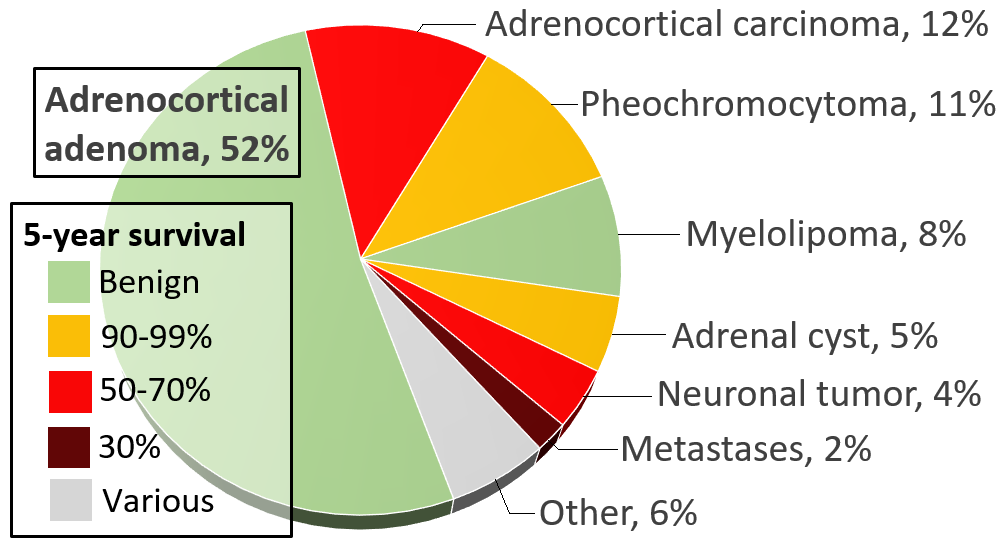
Incidences and prognoses of adrenal tumors, with adrenocortical adenoma at left.

- Prevalence: Female > Male
- More common in adults
- Relatively earlier onset in females (ages ≤ 20) than males (ages ≤ 30)
- Most common cause of ACTH-independent Cushing's syndrome

== See also ==
- Hyperplasia
- Adrenal tumor
- Cushing's syndrome
- Conn's syndrome
- Hypercortisolism
- Hyperaldosteronism
- Hyperandrogenism
- Adrenal gland
- Adrenal paraganglioma
- Adrenal Pheochromocytoma
- Adrenal ganglioneuroma
