= H295R =

Angiotensin-II-responsive steroid-producing adrenocortical cell line

H295R (also referred to as NCI-H295R) is an angiotensin-II-responsive steroid-producing adrenocortical cell line. It was initially isolated in 1980 from a 48-year-old female patient diagnosed with adrenocortical carcinoma. The initial polyclonal populations of tumor cells obtained from the patients' tumor were cultured and the resultant cell line was called NCI-H295. Because of slow growth rates and easy detachment of the original NCI-H295 strains, efforts were made to select a population of cells with better monolayer attachment and more rapid growth. Three strains were developed, based on the serum supplement used for growth, which have been termed H295R-S1, H295R-S2 and H295R-S3. All three strains grow as adherent monolayer cultures.
