= Adrenal tumor =

Tumors of the adrenal gland

An adrenal tumor or adrenal mass is any benign or malignant neoplasms of the adrenal gland, several of which are notable for their ability to overproduce endocrine hormones. Adrenal cancer is the presence of malignant adrenal tumors, which include neuroblastoma, adrenocortical carcinoma and some adrenal pheochromocytomas. Most adrenal pheochromocytomas and all adrenocortical adenomas are benign tumors, which do not metastasize or invade nearby tissues, but may cause significant symptoms by dysregulating hormones.

== Adrenal glands ==
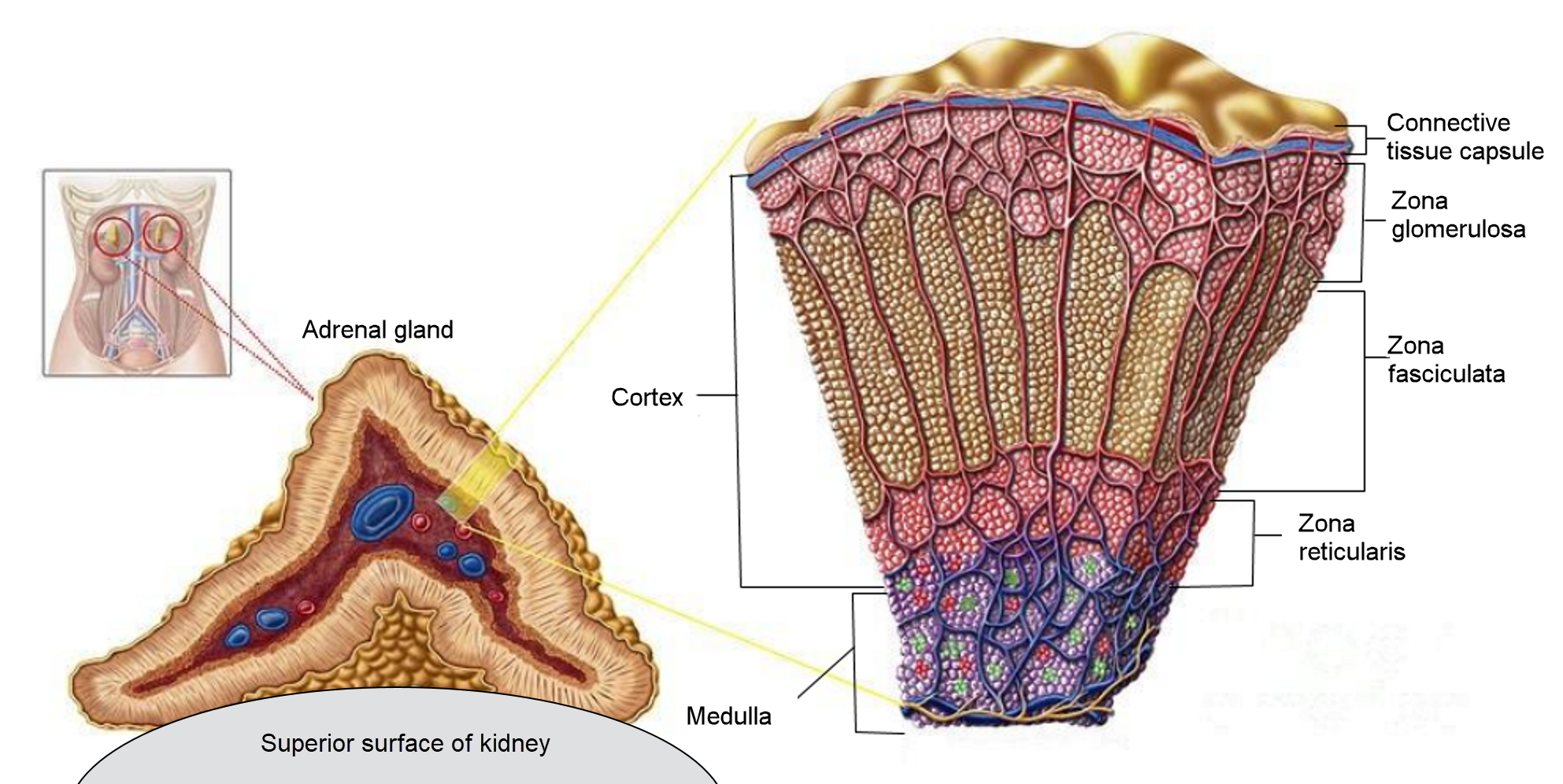

Adrenal glands, also known as the suprarenal glands, are located above each kidney and in the retroperitoneal space. They produce and regulate different hormones, including stress hormones like cortisol and hormones that regulate salt and water balance like aldosterone. The glands are triangular-shaped and are composed of two types of tissues: the cortex and the medulla. The glands are surrounded by a capsule made up of connective tissue and consist of outer portion or the cortex, and the inner portion or the medulla. The outer cortex is further divided into three layers, named the zona glomerulosa, zona fasciculata and zona reticularis, all which produce critical steroid hormones.

The inner portion or the medulla produces catecholamines such as adrenaline (epinephrine) and norepinephrine. Mineralocorticoid hormones like aldosterone, which regulates blood pressure, kidney function, and certain sex hormones, are produced by the outer layer of the adrenal cortex or the zona glomerulosa. Glucocorticoids are produced by the middle layer of the adrenal cortex, or the zona fasciculata. Glucocorticoids are critical for regulation of blood sugar and the immune system, as well as response to physiological stress. Androgens, which aid in the development of secondary sex characteristics, are produced by the inner zona reticularis. DHEA (dehydroepiandrosterone) is the most commonly found hormone in the body and is a precursor in the production of progesterone, estrogen, cortisol and testosterone.

== Tumors of the adrenal cortex ==
Adrenal tumor
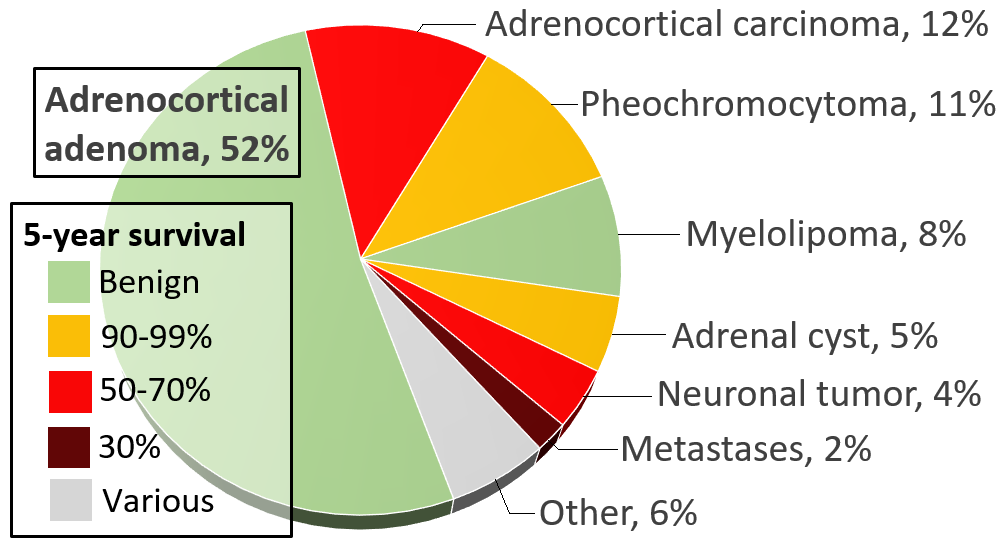
- Incidences and prognoses of adrenal tumors.
- Specialty: Oncology

Adrenal tumors can be classified using the TMN Staging System to determine the stage and grade of masses. Along with stage and grade, pathologic testing of the tumor margins can help determine prognosis. Benign tumors in the cortex are known as adenomas while malignant tumors are known as carcinomas. In 2022, the World Health Organization (WHO) updated a report on the classification of adrenal masses and determined genetic differences in mutations leading to each type of tumor. Mutations in the genes that produce ion channels have been implicated in the development of adenomas. Adenomas may also be a result of increased hypermethylation of DNA. Carcinomas were determined to be caused by mutations in Wnt and p53 pathways. Both adenoma and carcinoma tumors of the adrenal cortex may produce steroid hormones, with important clinical consequences.

=== Adrenocortical adenoma ===
Adrenocortical adenomas are benign tumors of the adrenal cortex that are extremely common (present in 1–10% of persons at autopsy). They can be confused with adrenocortical "nodules", however nodules are not true neoplasms. Adrenocortical adenomas are uncommon in patients younger than 30 years old, and have equal incidence in both sexes. The clinical significance of these neoplasms is two-fold. First, they have been detected as incidental findings with increasing frequency in recent years, due to the increasing use of CT scans and magnetic resonance imaging in a variety of medical settings. This can result in additional testing and invasive procedures to rule out the slight possibility of an early adrenocortical carcinoma. Second, a minority (about 15%) of adrenocortical adenomas are "functional", meaning that they produce glucocorticoids, mineralocorticoids, and/or sex steroids, resulting in endocrine disorders such as Cushing's syndrome, Conn's syndrome (hyperaldosteronism), virilization of females, or feminization of males. Functional adrenocortical adenomas are surgically curable.

Most of the adrenocortical adenomas are less than 2 cm in greatest dimension and less than 50 grams in weight. However, size and weight of the adrenal cortical tumors are no longer considered to be a reliable sign of benignity or malignancy. Grossly, adrenocortical adenomas are encapsulated, well-circumscribed, solitary tumors with solid, homogeneous yellow-cut surface. Necrosis and hemorrhage are rare findings.

=== Adrenocortical carcinoma ===
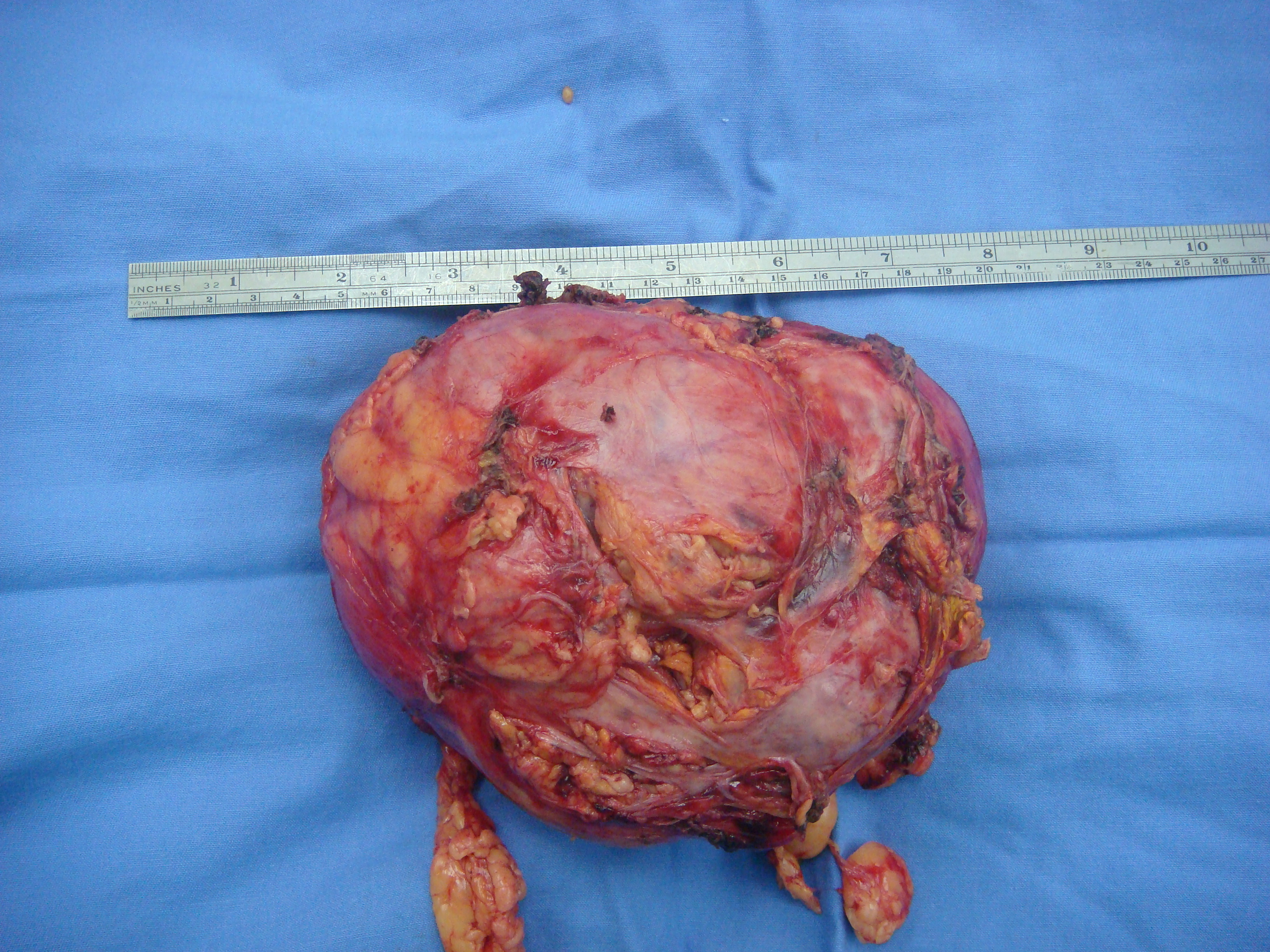
Photo of a large adrenal carcinoma, resected

Adrenocortical carcinoma (ACC) is a rare, highly aggressive cancer of adrenal cortical cells, which may occur in children or adults. ACCs may be "functional", producing steroid hormones and consequent endocrine dysfunction similar to that seen in many adrenocortical adenomas. Due to their location deep in the retroperitoneum, most adrenocortical carcinomas are not diagnosed until they have grown quite large. Adrenocortical carcinomas frequently invade large vessels, such as the renal vein and inferior vena cava, as well as metastasize via the lymphatics and through the blood to the lungs and other organs.

The most effective treatment is surgery, although this is not feasible for many patients, and the overall prognosis of the disease is poor. Chemotherapy, radiation therapy, and hormonal therapy may also be employed in the treatment of this disease.

== Tumors of the adrenal medulla ==
The adrenal medulla is located anatomically at the center of each adrenal gland, and is composed of neuroendocrine (chromaffin) cells which produce and release epinephrine (adrenaline) into the bloodstream in response to activation of the sympathetic nervous system. Neuroblastoma and pheochromocytoma are the two most important tumors which arise from the adrenal medulla. Both tumors may also arise from extra-adrenal sites, specifically, in the paraganglia of the sympathetic chain.

=== Neuroblastoma ===
Neuroblastoma is an aggressive cancer of immature neuroblastic cells (precursors of neurons), and is one of the most common pediatric cancers, with a median age at diagnosis of two years. Adrenal neuroblastoma typically presents with a rapidly enlarging abdominal mass. Although the tumor has often spread to distant parts of the body at the time of diagnosis, this cancer is unusual in that many cases are highly curable when the spread is limited to the liver, skin, and/or bone marrow (stage IVS). Related, but less aggressive tumors composed of more mature neural cells include ganglioneuroblastoma and ganglioneuroma. Neuroblastic tumors often produce elevated levels of catecholamine hormone metabolites, such as vanillylmandelic acid (VMA) and homovanillic acid, and may produce severe watery diarrhea through production of vasoactive intestinal peptide. Treatment of neuroblastoma includes surgery and radiation therapy for localized disease, and chemotherapy for metastatic disease.

=== Pheochromocytoma ===
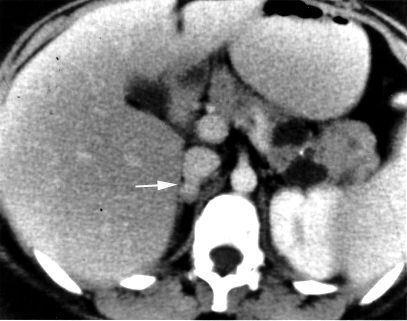
CT imaging of a pheochromocytoma as part of VHL disease

Pheochromocytoma is a neoplasm composed of cells similar to the chromaffin cells of the mature adrenal medulla. Pheochromocytomas occur in patients of all ages, and may be sporadic, or associated with a hereditary cancer syndrome, such as multiple endocrine neoplasia (MEN) types IIA and IIB, neurofibromatosis type I, or von Hippel–Lindau syndrome. Only 10% of adrenal pheochromocytomas are malignant, while the rest are benign tumors. The most clinically important feature of pheochromocytomas is their tendency to produce large amounts of the catecholamine hormones epinephrine (adrenaline) and norepinephrine. This may lead to potentially life-threatening high blood pressure, or cardiac arrhythmias, and numerous symptoms such as headache, palpitations, anxiety attacks, sweating, weight loss, and tremor. Diagnosis is most easily confirmed through urinary measurement of catecholamine metabolites such as VMA and metanephrines. Most pheochromocytomas are initially treated with anti-adrenergic drugs to protect against catecholamine overload, with surgery employed to remove the tumor once the patient is medically stable.

== Incidentalomas ==
An adrenal incidentaloma is an adrenal tumor found by coincidence without clinical symptoms or suspicion. It is one of the more common unexpected findings revealed by computed tomography (CT), magnetic resonance imaging (MRI), or ultrasonography. Adrenal incidentalomas often secrete cortisol and require thorough clinical evaluation.

Management of incidentalomas include evaluation by an endocrinologist or endocrine surgeon. Tumors under 3 cm are generally considered benign and are only treated if there are grounds for a diagnosis of Cushing's syndrome or pheochromocytoma. Radiodensity helps with estimating the risk of malignancy in a tumor. A tumor of 10 Hounsfield units or less on an un-enhanced CT is likely a lipid-rich adenoma.

On CT scan, benign adenomas typically are of low radiographic density (due to fat content) and show rapid washout of contrast medium (50% or more of the contrast medium washes out at 10 minutes). If the hormonal evaluation is negative and imaging suggests benign, follow-up should be considered with imaging at 6, 12, and 24 months and repeat hormonal evaluation yearly for 4 years.

Adrenal-dedicated CT and MRI imaging can be performed to distinguish benign adenomas from potentially malignant lesions. Online calculators assist radiologists in calculating the washout of contrast in adrenal nodules on CT and chemical shift on MRI.

Hormonal evaluations can also be used, which include:

- 1-mg overnight dexamethasone suppression test to detect excess cortisol
- 24-hour urinary specimen for measurement of fractionated metanephrines and catecholamines
- Blood plasma aldosterone concentration and plasma renin activity, if hypertension is present

Main sites of metastases for some common cancer types. Primary cancers are denoted by "...cancer" and their main metastasis sites are denoted by "...metastases". Lung cancer metastasis to the adrenal glands are mentioned with red arrows.

== Metastasis to the adrenals ==
Metastasis, or mets, to one or both adrenal glands is the most common form of malignant adrenal lesion, and the second most common adrenal tumor after benign adenomas. Primary tumors in are most commonly from lung cancer (39%), breast cancer (35%), melanoma, gastrointestinal tract cancer, pancreas cancer, and renal cancer. Clinical concern for mets to adrenal glands requires evaluation for adrenal insufficiency as well as evaluation for tumor markers that can determine involvement of other areas of metastatic disease.

== Epidemiology ==
Adrenal tumors are common tumors in humans. The detection of adrenal incidentalomas has increased, likely due to improvement in imaging modalities. A population based study by Ebbehoj et al. determined a 10x increase in adrenal tumors from 1995 to 2010, aligning with an increase in abdominal scans. Incidentalomas were also determined to be increasingly functional due to better evaluation methods for hormonal imbalances that the tumors may cause. In review of literature by Zeiger et al., it was also determined that about 80% of adrenal tumors found incidentally were non-functional adenomas, while the remaining had functional, malignant or metastatic tumors.

== Treatment ==
=== Surgical ===
Diagnosis of adrenal tumors occur through lab and imaging studies. For adrenal carcinomas, the most effective treatment is surgery, however, surgery may not be feasible for many patients and the overall prognosis of the disease is poor. Chemotherapy, radiation therapy, and hormonal therapy may also be employed in the treatment of this disease.

Because pheochromocytomas can cause imbalances in catecholamines that can be life-threatening, treatment and optimization before surgery is required. Close monitoring during the surgery and careful consideration for the anesthesia used during the surgery for a pheochromocytoma is also required to ensure that catecholamine release is avoided. Patients can also experience a drop in blood pressure or hypotension after the tumor is removed, which is treated with adrenergic agonists and fluids.

In pregnant patients, functional adrenal tumors can lead to complications in pregnancy, for example, if the tumor leads to symptoms of hypertension. Surgical management (adrenalectomy) has been determined to be safe for pregnant patients and fetuses.

A 2018 Cochrane Systematic review compared two different types of surgery: laparoscopic retroperitoneal adrenalectomy and laparoscopic transperitoneal adrenalectomy in different types of adrenal tumors. Laparoscopic retroperitoneal adrenalectomy appeared to reduce late morbidity, time to oral fluid or food intake and time to ambulation, when compared to laparoscopic transperitoneal adrenalectomy. However, there was uncertainty in these findings due to low-quality evidence, as well as inconclusive findings about effects of either surgery on all-cause mortality, early morbidity, socioeconomic effects, duration of surgery, operative blood loss, and conversion to open surgery. Lymphadenectomy or removal of surrounding lymph nodes is also recommended.

=== Non-surgical management ===
Non-surgical management of adrenocortical cancer: Although surgery is recommended for the best chance of survival without reoccurrence, Mitotane has also been used in the non-surgical management of adrenocortical carcinomas as adjuvant therapy. Mitotane is given orally via tablets and levels are monitored to ensure proper levels. Retrospective studies have analyzed the efficacy of mitotane and have determined that it should be used as adjuvant therapy in cases of patients with increased risk of reoccurrence. Mitotane can induce hormonal dysregulation including adrenal insufficiency, hypothyroidism, and hypogonadism. Non-hormonal side effects of this medication include fatigue, GI symptoms, dyslipidemia, skin rash and mild leukopenia.

== Future diagnostic tools ==
Blood circulating microRNAs (miRNA) has been investigated in the recent years for the potential as a less-invasive biomarker for adrenal diseases. Nine studies have so far investigated the occurrence of circulating miRNAs in blood from patients diagnosed with adrenocortical tumors. MiRNAs can be released into the blood stream by three different types of excretion. Cellular damage with passive release (necrosis, inflammation), active secretion in the form of extracellular vesicles (EV) (microvesicles, exosomes and apoptotic bodies) or in association with high density lipoproteins (HDL) and Argonaute (AGO) proteins. The majority of miRNAs found in blood are in complexes with AGO. Despite the promising results, the sensitivity of potential circulating miRNA markers for adrenocortical tumors appears to be variable. An increase in sensitivity could possibly be achieved by targeting only EV-associated miRNAs as the release of miRNAs into EVs are hypothesized to be a controlled process. EV-associated miRNAs could thereby act as more specific markers of malignancy. However, as there were significant differences in the results of the studies performed, methodological differences and low patient numbers could contribute to this discrepancy. This calls for further studies on larger cohorts with uniform methodological requirements to clarify the applicability of circulating miRNAs as biomarkers of prognosis and malignancy in patients diagnosed with adrenocortical tumors. In canines, elevated plasma concentration of the CgA epitope vasostatin showed potential as a biomarker for a subset of catecholamine-secreting tumours.
