= Adrenocortical carcinoma =

Cancer of the adrenal cortex

- Other names: Adrenal cortical carcinoma, adrenocorticocarcinoma, adrenal cortical cancer, adrenal cortex cancer
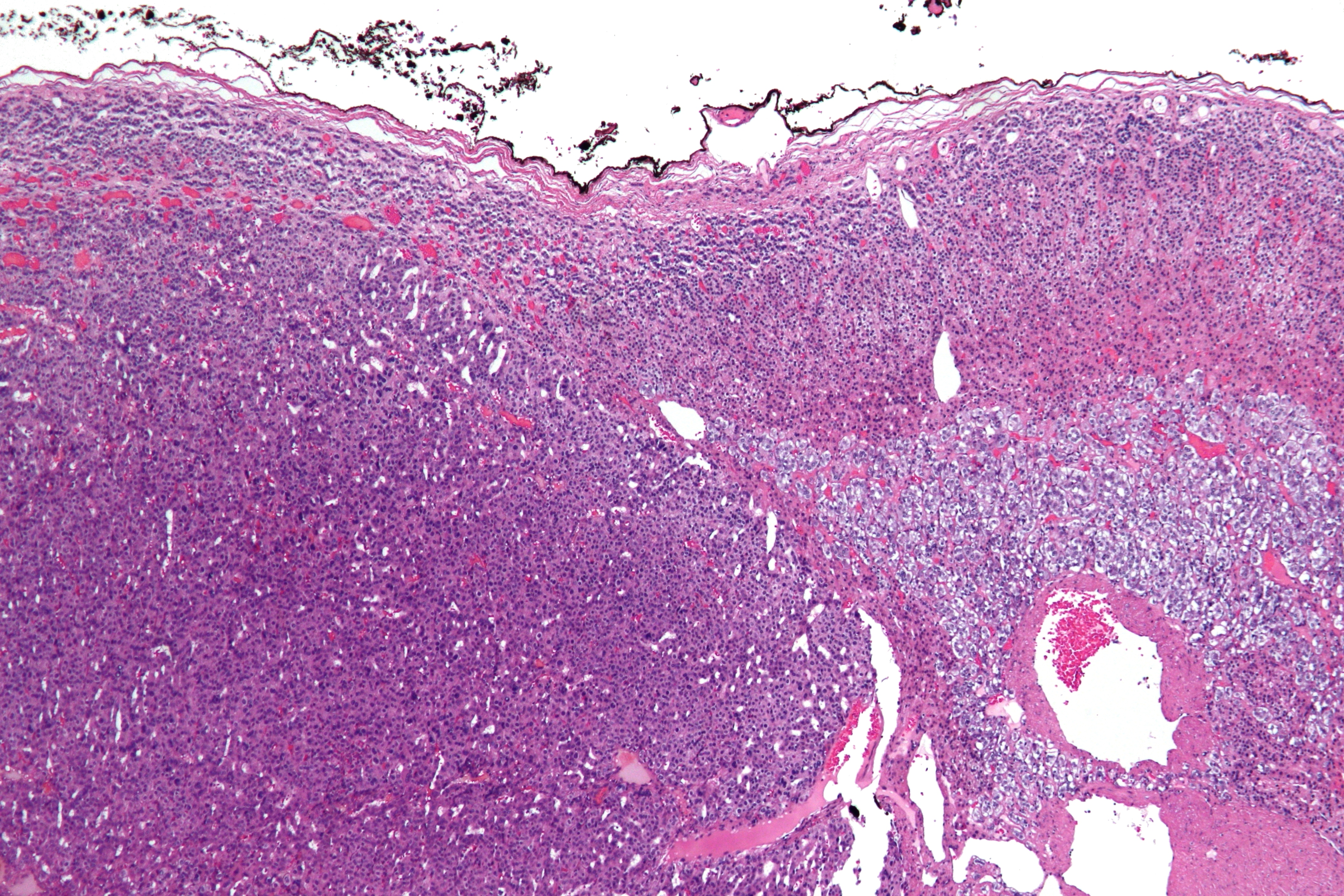
- Micrograph of an adrenocortical carcinoma (left of image – dark blue) and the adrenal cortex it arose from (right-top of image – pink/light blue). Benign adrenal medulla is present (right-middle of image – gray/blue). H&E stain.
- Specialty: Oncology
- Frequency: 0.0005%

Adrenocortical carcinoma (ACC) is an aggressive cancer originating in the cortex (steroid hormone-producing tissue) of the adrenal gland.

Adrenocortical carcinoma is remarkable for the many hormonal syndromes that can occur in patients with steroid hormone-producing ("functional") tumors, including Cushing's syndrome, Conn syndrome, virilization, and feminization. Adrenocortical carcinoma has often invaded nearby tissues or metastasized to distant organs at the time of diagnosis, and the overall 5-year survival rate is about 50%.

Adrenocortical carcinoma is a rare tumor, with incidence of one to two per million population annually. It has a bimodal distribution by age, with cases clustering in children under 5 and in adults 30–40 years old. The widely used angiotensin-II-responsive steroid-producing cell line H295R was originally isolated from a tumor diagnosed as adrenocortical carcinoma.

Adrenocortical carcinoma can occur at any age, with the highest incidence between 40 and 60 years of age. Women are more frequently affected (55 to 60%) than men (40 to 45%). Adrenocortical carcinomas usually occur sporadically in adults. However, they sometimes occur as part of hereditary syndromes, such as:

- Li-Fraumeni syndrome
- Lynch syndrome
- Multiple endocrine neoplasia (MEN)
- Familial adenomatous polyposis (see also adenomatosis)

== Signs and symptoms ==
Adrenocortical carcinoma may present differently in children and adults. Most tumors in children are functional, and virilization is by far the most common presenting symptom(s), followed by Cushing's syndrome and precocious puberty. Among adults presenting with hormonal syndromes, Cushing's syndrome alone is most common, followed by mixed Cushing's and virilization (glucocorticoid and androgen overproduction). Feminization and Conn syndrome (mineralocorticoid excess) occur in less than 10% of cases. Rarely, pheochromocytoma-like hypersecretion of catecholamines has been reported in adrenocortical cancers. Nonfunctional tumors (about 40%, authorities vary) usually present with abdominal or flank pain, varicocele, and renal vein thrombosis or they may be asymptomatic and detected incidentally.

All patients with suspected ACC should be carefully evaluated for signs and symptoms of hormonal syndromes. For Cushing's syndrome (glucocorticoid excess), these include weight gain, muscle wasting, purple lines on the abdomen, a fatty "buffalo hump" on the neck, a "moon-like" face, and thinning, fragile skin. Virilism (androgen excess) is most obvious in women, and may produce excess facial and body hair, acne, enlargement of the clitoris, deepening of the voice, coarsening of facial features, cessation of menstruation. Conn syndrome (mineralcorticoid excess) is marked by high blood pressure, which can result in headache and hypokalemia (low serum potassium, which can in turn produce muscle weakness, confusion, and palpitations), low plasma renin activity, and high serum aldosterone. Feminization (estrogen excess) is most readily noted in men, and includes breast enlargement, decreased libido, and impotence.

== Pathophysiology ==
The main etiologic factor of ACC is unknown, although families with Li–Fraumeni syndrome, caused by an inherited inactivation mutation in TP53, have increased risk. Several genes have been shown to be recurrently mutated, including TP53, CTNNB1, MEN1, PRKAR1A, RPL22, and DAXX. The telomerase gene TERT is often amplified while ZNRF3 and CDKN2A are often homozygously deleted. The genes h19, insulin-like growth factor II (IGF-II), and p57^{kip2} are important for fetal growth and development. They are located on chromosome 11p. Expression of the h19 gene is markedly reduced in both nonfunctioning and functioning adrenal cortical carcinomas, especially in tumors producing cortisol and aldosterone. Also, a loss occurs of activity of the p57kip2 gene product in virilizing adenomas and adrenal cortical carcinomas. In contrast, IGF-II gene expression has been shown to be high in adrenal cortical carcinomas. Finally, c-myc gene expression is relatively high in neoplasms, and it is often linked to poor prognosis.

Bilateral adrenocortical tumors are less common than unilateral. The majority of bilateral tumours can be distinguished according to size and aspect of the nodules: primary pigmented nodular adrenocortical disease, which can be sporadic or part of Carney complex, and primary bilateral macro nodular adrenal hyperplasia.Metastasis is most commonly to the liver and lung.

== Diagnosis ==
=== Incidental discovery ===
Approximately 30% of adrenal gland carcinomas are diagnosed incidentally (incidentalomas). However, the probability that an adrenal gland incidentaloma is a carcinoma of the adrenal cortex is very low. Adenomas are much more common in this situation. Other benign or malignant tumors can also be the underlying cause.

=== Laboratory findings ===
Hormonal syndromes should be confirmed with laboratory testing. Laboratory findings in Cushing syndrome include increased serum glucose (blood sugar) and increased urine cortisol. Adrenal virilism is confirmed by the finding of an excess of serum androstenedione and dehydroepiandrosterone. Findings in Conn syndrome include low serum potassium, low plasma renin activity, and high serum aldosterone. Feminization is confirmed with the finding of excess serum estrogen.

=== Imaging ===
Radiological studies of the abdomen, such as CT scans and magnetic resonance imaging are useful for identifying the site of the tumor, differentiating it from other diseases, such as adrenocortical adenoma, and determining the extent of invasion of the tumor into surrounding organs and tissues. On CT, it shows heterogeneous appearance due to necrosis, calcifications, and haemorrhage. After contrast injection, it shows peripheral enhancement. Invasion of adjacent structures such as kidney, vena cava, liver, and retroperitoneal lymph nodes are also common. Online open-access datasets of adrenocortical carcinoma CT examinations are available.

On MRI, it shows low intensity on T1-weighted images, and high T2 signal with strong heterogeneous contrast enhancement and slow washout. Haemorrhagic areas may show high T1-signal. Imaging with positron emission tomography (PET) is useful during initial investigation of potentially malignant adrenal tumors and for detecting metastasis. Fluorodeoxyglucose ([^{18}F]FDG or FDG) has high sensitivity but cannot distinguish ACC from other malignancies. ^{11}C-labelled metomidate binds to enzymes expressed in adrenocortical cells and has been used as a radiotracer with high specificity for adrenal tumors.

=== Pathology ===
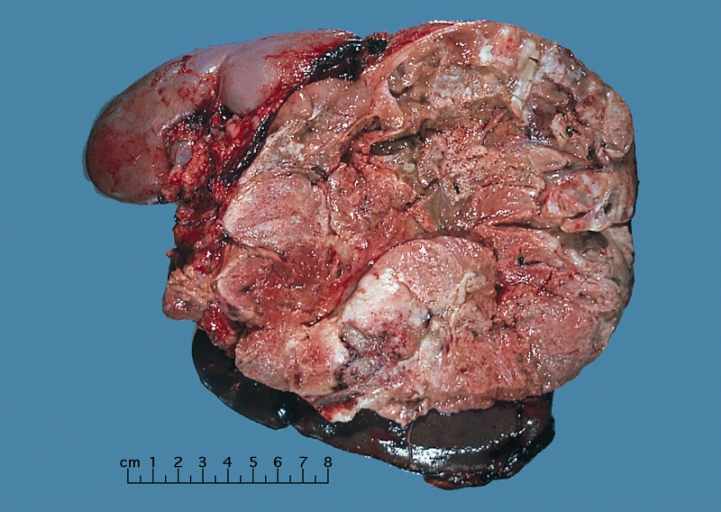
Gross view of a large ACC

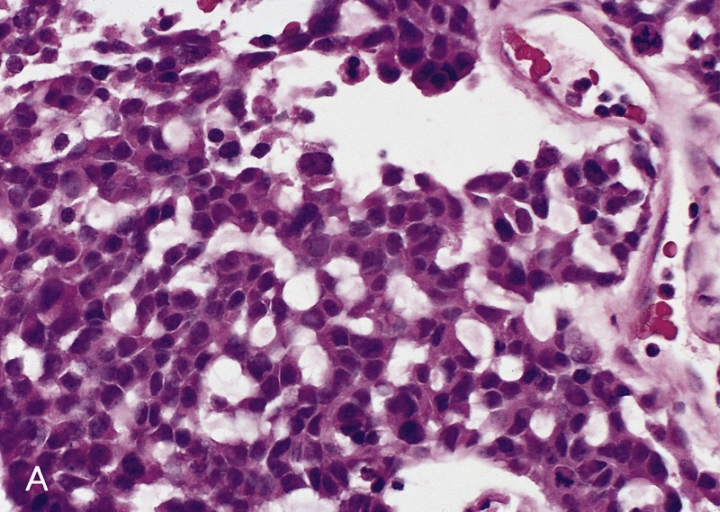
Cell-block preparation from a fine-needle aspiration biopsy of a large ACC shows tumor cells with compact, eosinophilic cytoplasm and a mild degree of nuclear pleomorphism.

Adrenal tumors are often not biopsied prior to surgery, so diagnosis is confirmed on examination of the surgical specimen by a pathologist. Grossly, ACCs are often large, with a tan-yellow cut surface, and areas of hemorrhage and necrosis. On microscopic examination, the tumor usually displays sheets of atypical cells with some resemblance to the cells of the normal adrenal cortex. The presence of invasion and mitotic activity help differentiate small cancers from adrenocortical adenomas. Several relatively rare variants of ACC include:

- Oncocytic adrenal cortical carcinoma
- Myxoid adrenal cortical carcinoma
- Carcinosarcoma
- Adenosquamous adrenocortical carcinoma
- Clear cell adrenal cortical carcinoma

=== Differential diagnosis ===
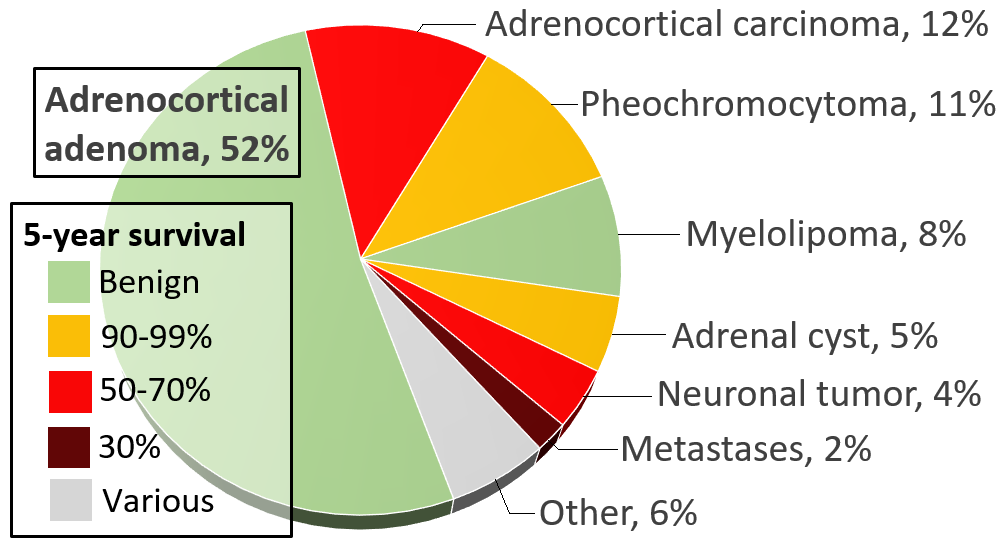
Incidences and prognoses of adrenal tumors, with adrenocortical carcinoma at top.

Differential diagnosis includes:

- Adrenocortical adenoma
- Renal cell carcinoma
- Pheochromocytoma
- Hepatocellular carcinoma

Adrenocortical carcinomas are most commonly distinguished from adrenocortical adenomas (their benign counterparts) by the Weiss system, as follows:

Characteristic	Score
High nuclear grade (enlarged, oval to lobated, with coarsely granular to hyperchromatic chromatin and easily discernible, prominent nucleoli)	1
More mitoses than 5/50 high power fields	1
Atypical mitoses	1
Eosinophilic cytoplasm in >75% of tumor cells	1
Diffuse architecture of >33% of tumor	1
Necrosis	1
Venous invasion	1
Sinusoidal invasion (no smooth muscle in wall)	1
Capsular invasion	1

Total score indicates:

- 0-2: Adrenocortical adenoma
- 3: Undetermined
- 4-9: Adrenocortical carcinoma

== Prognosis ==
ACC, generally, carries a poor prognosis, with an overall 5-year survival rate of about 50%. Five-year disease-free survival for a complete resection of a stage I–III ACC is about 30%. The most important prognostic factors are age of the patient and stage of the tumor. Poor prognostic factors include mitotic activity, venous invasion, weight of 50 g or more, diameter of 6.5 cm or more, Ki-67/MIB1 labeling index of 4% or more, and p53 positive.

In its malignancy, adrenocortical carcinoma is unlike most tumours of the adrenal cortex, which are benign (adenomas) and only occasionally cause Cushing's syndrome.

== Treatment ==
The only curative treatment is complete surgical excision of the tumor, which can be performed even in the case of invasion into large blood vessels, such as the renal vein or inferior vena cava. The 5-year survival rate after successful surgery is 50–60%, but unfortunately, many patients are not surgical candidates. A 2018 systematic review suggests that laparoscopic retroperotenial adrenalectomy appears to reduce late morbidity, time to oral fluid or food intake and time to ambulation when compared to laparoscopic transperitoneal adrenalectomy, however there is uncertainty about these effects due to very low-quality evidence. For outcomes such as all-cause mortality, early morbidity, socioeconomic effects, and operative and postoperative parameter, the evidence is uncertain about the effects of either interventions over the other.

Radiation therapy and radiofrequency ablation may be used for palliation in patients who are not surgical candidates. Minimally invasive surgical techniques remain controversial due to the absence of long-term data, with a particular concern for rates of recurrence and peritoneal carcinomatosis.

Chemotherapy regimens typically include the drug mitotane, an inhibitor of steroid synthesis, which is toxic to cells of the adrenal cortex, as well as standard cytotoxic drugs. A retrospective analysis showed a survival benefit for mitotane in addition to surgery when compared to surgery alone.

The two most common regimens are cisplatin, doxorubicin, etoposide (EDP) + mitotane, and streptozotocin + mitotane. The FIRM-ACT trial demonstrated higher rates of response and longer progression-free survival with EDP + mitotane than with streptozotocin + mitotane.

=== Therapy studies ===
Due to the rarity of the disease, many important questions about adrenocortical carcinoma remain unanswered. Therefore, as many patients as possible should be treated in registry studies or therapy studies.

=== Therapy support ===
In addition to therapy primarily focused on treating the tumor, the treating physician will administer supportive therapy. Furthermore, there are numerous other support services available. These can help patients and their families cope better with the diagnosis, cancer treatment, and the consequences of the disease. The following list is not a complete overview of all available support services. It consists of examples that can facilitate the initial search for suitable support for the individual patient.

- Genetic counseling
- Pregnancy and adrenocortical carcinoma
- Advice centers, general
- Advice centers, special topics
- Other assistance
- Self-help groups (e.g. LET'S CURE ACC, https://letscureacc.com/)

== Children with adrenocotrical carcinoma ==
=== General information ===
Adrenocortical carcinoma is extremely rare in children (approximately 0.2 to 0.3 cases per 1 million per year). The prognosis is poor. There are currently no established standards for diagnosis and treatment. Therefore, the "ENSAT kids" study group was established for children with adrenocortical carcinoma within ENSAT. While only a proportion of adrenocortical carcinomas in adults are hormonally active, almost all of these carcinomas are hormonally active in affected children. Cushing's syndrome, precocious puberty, or virilization usually occur. As with the treatment of adult patients, the tumor is completely removed surgically. If an advanced stage is present, lymph nodes are also removed in children, and chemotherapy and mitotane therapy are administered.

=== State of research ===
Approximately 70% of affected children are female. Of these, about 90% are hormone-active carcinomas.

- 50% androgens
- 30% mixed
- 10% steroids
- 10% hormone-inactive

The average time from the onset of symptoms to diagnosis is six months. Approximately 70% of tumors can be completely removed surgically.

The current state of research is considered insufficient. The few available comparisons between adrenocortical carcinomas in adults and children indicate significant differences. Therefore, findings obtained so far in adults cannot be readily applied to children. To close these knowledge gaps and to be able to determine suitable therapies for children, a better molecular biological understanding of the prognosis and tumor biology of adrenocortical tumors in children is needed.

Currently, the main research questions are:

1. Clinical: International assessment of diagnostics and therapy with the aim of improving clinical understanding and treatment procedures.
2. Clinical-translational: Analysis of the significance of plasma and urine steroid profiles / liquid biopsy with the aim of identifying suitable tumor markers.
3. Experimental: Identification of immunohistochemical characteristics and DNA sequencing with the aim of identifying drugable targets, i.e., targets for the drug treatment of tumor cells. This should ensure that healthy cells are spared from the drug as much as possible.

== ENS@T ==
ENS@T
- Formation: May 15th, 2009
- Location: Paris, France
- Members: 428
- President: Cristina Ronchi
- Website: https://www.ensat.org/

European Network for the Study of Adrenal Tumors – ENS@T was founded in 2009 to promote research on adrenal tumors. Its target is to improve the understanding of the pathophysiology and natural progression, as well as the diagnostic and therapeutic treatment of adrenal tumors and adrenal hormone excess. Its focus is a permanent and integrated European network for adrenal tumor research

The network was informally founded in 2002. It originally consisted of four founding partners: COMETE (Cortical and Medullary Endocrine Tumors), GANIMED (German Network for Adrenal Gland Diseases for the Improvement of Research and Teaching), NISGAT (National Italian Study Group for Adrenal Tumors), and UK ACT (UK AdrenoCortical Tumor Network). Xavier Bertagna from France assumed the chairmanship. Between 2002 and 2008, common quality criteria were defined, which are a mandatory prerequisite for the implementation and execution of quality strategies and are based on scientific findings and experience. Furthermore, clinical databases were created that document cases of aldosterone-producing and non-aldosterone-producing adrenocortical adenomas, adrenocortical carcinomas, as well as pheochromocytomas or paragangliomas. Four working groups were also established:

- Aldosterone-producing adenoma
- Non-aldosterone-producing adenoma
- Adrenocortical carcinoma
- Pheochromocytoma

The inaugural general assembly took place in Paris on May 15, 2009.

Due to the fact that adrenal tumors are rare, progress in their diagnosis and treatment is only possible through collaboration between researchers and clinicians from different countries. To overcome these challenges and enable significant progress for affected patients, a Europe-wide network for adrenal tumors (ENS@T) was established. ENS@T aims to improve the understanding of the genetics, genesis of tumors, and hormone overproduction in patients with adrenal tumors and associated familial syndromes. It seeks to optimize the prediction of recurrence and the treatment of malignant adrenal tumors, which are particularly rare. Research into adrenal tumors is expected to uncover new molecular mechanisms of tumor growth and provide insights into the role of hormones in causing high blood pressure (hypertension). To this end, ENS@T pools expertise and resources to achieve significant advances in basic and clinical research, thereby promoting the translation of basic research into clinical practice and contributing to the fight against adrenal tumors. The network operates as a non-profit, transnational platform to improve the dissemination of research material on adrenal tumors and optimize standards for diagnosis and treatment. To achieve these goals, ENS@T collaborates with the A5 American Australian Asian Adrenal Alliance.

The governing bodies of ENS@T include the General Assembly, the executive board, and an advisory board. The network's scientific activities are divided among four working groups, each one with an operative Scientific Board. In addition, the ENS@T Registry is operated. Its target is to include as many patients suffering from adrenal tumors as possible in the registry. The data are initially used to answer various statistical questions. Furthermore, the data can also be used to compare the effectiveness of different forms of therapy.

== Epidemiology ==
Adrenocortical carcinoma is rare, with an estimated 1-2 per million people diagnosed each year. It is more common in women (around 60% of cases) than men.
