= Adrenalectomy =

Surgical removal of adrenal glands

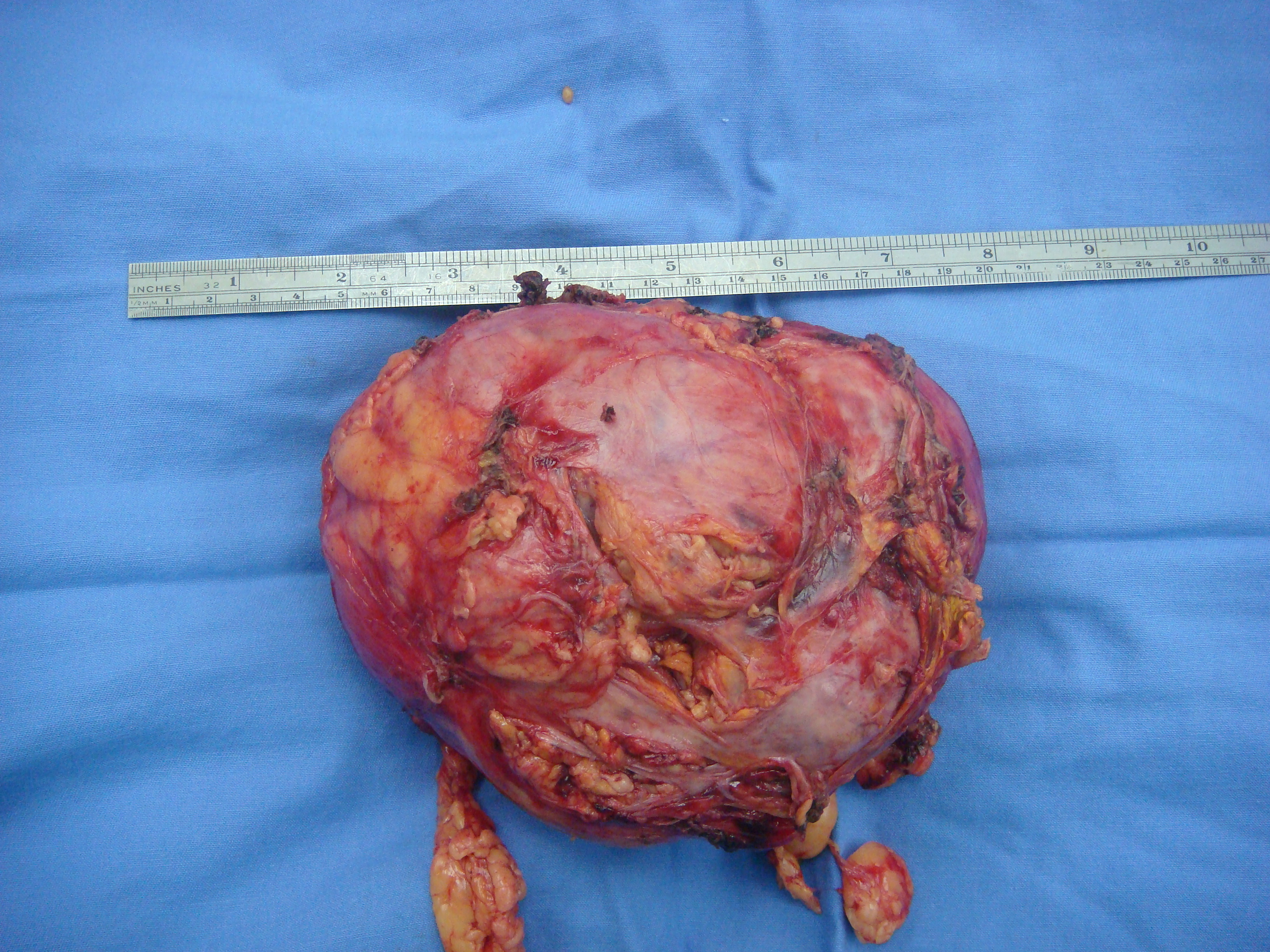
- Adrenalectomy
- ICD-10-PCS: 0GB2-0GB4 for excision, 0GT2-0GT4 for resection
- ICD-9-CM: 07.2-07.3
- MeSH: D000315
- MedlinePlus: 007437

Adrenalectomy (Latin root Ad "near/at" + renal "related to the kidneys" + Greek ‑ectomy "out-cutting"; sometimes written as ADX for the procedure or resulting state) is the surgical removal of one (unilateral) or both (bilateral) adrenal glands. It is usually done to remove tumors of the adrenal glands that are producing excess hormones or is large in size (more than 2 inches or 4 to 5 centimeters). Adrenalectomy can also be done to remove a cancerous tumor of the adrenal glands, or cancer that has spread from another location, such as the kidney or lung. Adrenalectomy is not performed on those who have severe coagulopathy or whose heart and lungs are too weak to undergo surgery. The procedure can be performed using an open incision (laparotomy) or minimally invasive laparoscopic or robot-assisted techniques. Minimally invasive techniques are increasingly the gold standard of care due to shorter length of stay in the hospital, lower blood loss, and similar complication rates.

Diagram showing the position of the adrenal glands

One adrenal gland sits above each kidney. The two adrenal glands produce hormones (steroid hormones and catecholamines) that help regulate blood pressure, blood sugar level, metabolism, immune system, stress and other essential functions. If one adrenal gland is removed, the other adrenal gland will take over the hormone-producing role. If both adrenal glands are removed, the patient will require lifelong steroid supplementation.

== Indications ==
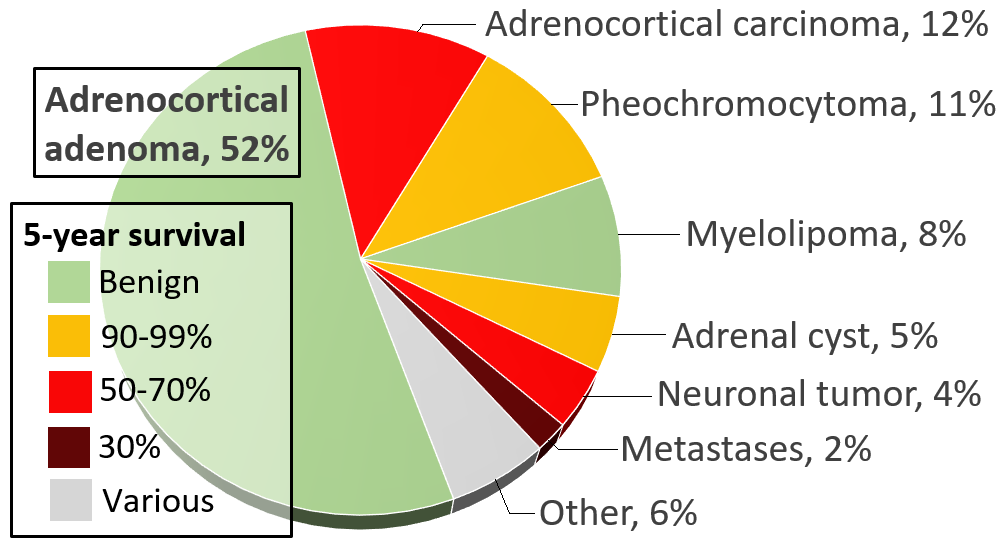
Incidences and prognoses of adrenal tumors; over half of which are benign (noncancerous).

Most adrenal tumors are noncancerous (benign), often found incidentally as a mass via imaging such as CT scans, MRI, or ultrasound that were taken for other health workups (see incidentaloma). Although these adrenal masses do require evaluation, the majority of them (approximately 80%) do not require adrenalectomy. However, due to the hormone-producing function of the adrenal glands, some noncancerous adrenal tumors may produce too much hormones, such as aldosterone (called primary aldosteronism), cortisol (called Cushing's disease or Cushing's syndrome), or catecholamines (called pheochromocytoma). These hormone-producing tumors may need adrenalectomy. Additionally, adrenal tumors that are larger than 4 centimeters in size, regardless of whether they produce hormones, also require adrenalectomy due to increased risk of adrenal cancer. Rarely (5–12%), the adrenal tumor may be cancerous (adrenocortical carcinoma), requiring adrenalectomy. Rarer still, the mass may be a metastatic cancer that spread from another location, such as the kidney or lung. If the metastasis is isolated to the adrenal gland, it may be a candidate for adrenalectomy.

== Contraindications ==
An absolute contraindication (a reason not to do the surgery under any situation) for adrenalectomy are patients who are generally unsuited to surgery: having severe coagulopathy and poor cardiopulmonary performance due to the stress to the body that surgery will produce. In addition, American Association of Clinical Endocrinologists and American Association of Endocrine Surgeons guidelines state minimally-invasive techniques should be avoided when there is a large tumor size (larger than 6 cm) due to difficulties in maneuvering around a large mass, and in adrenocortical carcinoma where there is a risk of not fully removing the cancerous tissue. However, at least one meta-analysis of 898 patients has found shorter length of stay, less blood loss, and no higher rates of complications even in large (>5 cm) tumors using minimally-invasive techniques.

== Techniques ==
Techniques for adrenalectomy is largely divided into two types: open surgical laparotomy versus minimally invasive techniques.

=== Open surgery ===
Surgeons usually reserve open surgery for large (larger than 6 cm) or cancerous tumors where there is a risk of not fully removing the cancerous tissue. They perform open surgery using traditional instruments and cuts (incisions).

=== Minimally invasive techniques ===
Minimally invasive techniques may be laparoscopic, where several small cuts (incisions) are made to allow for the surgeon to directly control surgical instruments with their hands while visualizing the surgery via a tiny camera that provides a magnified, 3D view of the surgical site. Laparoscopic surgery has many benefits. For example, this surgery has smaller scars, less pain, less blood loss, similar complication rates, and a shorter recovery period than traditional open surgery. Traditionally, this has been through the laparoscopic transperitoneal approach (LTA) where the small cuts are made in the abdomen to reach the adrenal glands through the peritoneum from the front-side.

However, an alternative approach is possible called retroperitoneoscopic adrenalectomy (PRA), where the adrenal glands are reached through small cuts made in the back. Studies have shown that both LTA and PRA are equally safe and effective, though some suggest advantages of PRA over LTA in terms of lower intensity of postoperative pain, shorter hospital stay, faster recovery, and lower early morbidity. A 2018 systematic review suggests that laparoscopic retroperotenial adrenalectomy appears to reduce late morbidity, time to oral fluid or food intake and time to ambulation when compared to laparoscopic transperitoneal adrenalectomy; however, there is uncertainty about these effects due to very low-quality evidence. For outcomes such as all-cause mortality, early morbidity, socioeconomic effects, and operative and postoperative parameter, the evidence is uncertain about the effects of either interventions over the other. PRA involves high pressure CO_{2} within a limited retroperitoneal space, and therefore may cause kidney injury in those at high risk.

Sometimes surgeons perform robot-assisted adrenalectomies. They perform the surgery through small cuts (incisions) using robotic arms with a camera and instruments attached. The camera gives doctors a high-definition, magnified, 3D view of the surgical site. No significant differences were found between laparoscopic and robot-assisted adrenalectomy in two meta-analyses for complications, blood loss, or mortality, however robotic adrenalectomy had shorter hospital stays at the cost of longer operating time and higher cost of surgery.

== Postoperative ==
Postoperative care is highly dependent on what the adrenalectomy was performed for. After adrenalectomy for a cortisol-producing adenoma, patients should be treated with exogenous glucocorticoids such as cortisone or hydrocortisone until the hypothalamic-pituitary-adrenal (HPA) axis has recovered. This process may take 6 to 18 months after unilateral adrenalectomy. Similarly, for patients who have undergone adrenalectomy for (subclinical) Cushing syndrome, perioperative glucocorticoid therapy and postoperative assessment of HPA axis recovery are necessary. For patients who have undergone adrenalectomy for a pheochromocytoma, long-term followup is necessary because 10-15% of patients may have recurrence. For those with high blood pressure (secondary hypertension) from primary aldosteronism, adrenalectomy provides a clinical cure rate of approximately 27.1%.

If both adrenal glands are removed, the patient can no longer create the adrenal hormones necessary for life (primary adrenal insufficiency). Signs and symptoms include volume depletion, hypotension, hyponatremia, hyperkalemia, fever, abdominal pain. This requires lifetime treatment with the hormones produced by the removed adrenal glands, including glucocorticoids and mineralocorticoids (fludrocortisone). The glucocorticoid dose needs to be increased when in stress or during infections or else adrenal crisis may occur.

For women with deficiency in androgens as a result of the loss of androgen production from the adrenal glands following adrenalectomy, dehydroepiandrosterone (DHEA) replacement can be considered. The signs and symptoms include low libido, depressive symptoms, and/or low energy levels despite optimized glucocorticoid and mineralocorticoid replacement.

== Complications ==
Complications from an adrenalectomy can include insufficient cortisol production, acute kidney injury, post-operative bleeding, damage to nearby organs, and post-operative infection.

== See also ==
- List of surgeries by type
