= Adenoma =

Benign tumor of glandular origin and/or characteristics

- Other names: Adenomas, adenomata
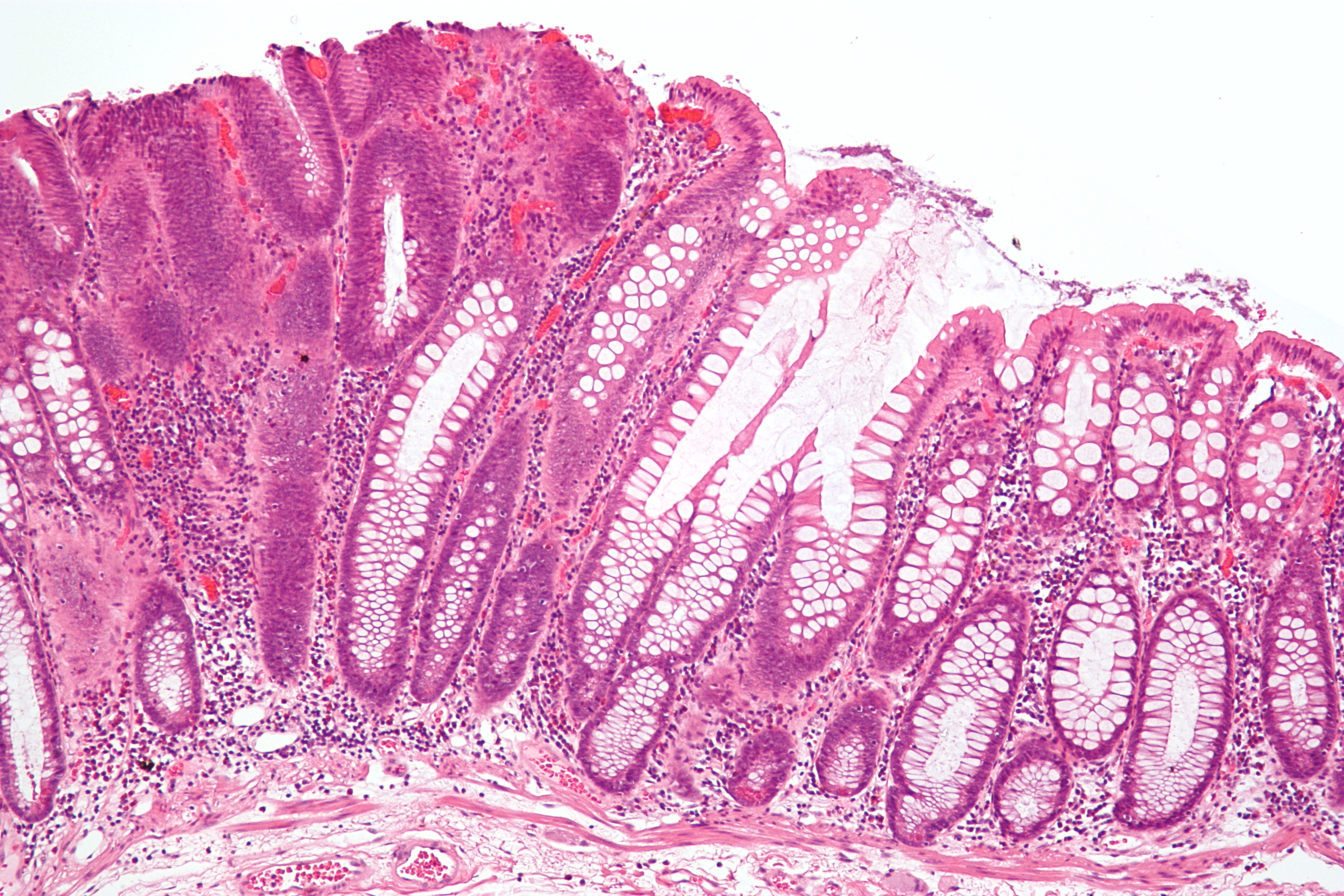
- Micrograph of a tubular adenoma (left of image), a type of colonic polyp and a precursor of colorectal cancer. Normal colorectal mucosa is seen on the right of the image. H&E stain.
- Pronunciation: /ˌædɪˈnoʊmə/, /ˌædɪˈnoʊmɪtə/
- Specialty: Oncology

An adenoma is a benign tumor of epithelial tissue with glandular origin, glandular characteristics, or both. Adenomas can grow from many glandular organs, including the adrenal glands, pituitary gland, thyroid, prostate, and others. Some adenomas grow from epithelial tissue in nonglandular areas but express glandular tissue structure (as can happen in familial polyposis coli). Although adenomas are benign, they should be treated as pre-cancerous. Over time adenomas may transform to become malignant, at which point they become adenocarcinomas. Most adenomas do not transform. However, even though benign, they have the potential to cause serious health complications by compressing other structures (mass effect) and by producing large amounts of hormones in an unregulated, non-feedback-dependent manner (causing paraneoplastic syndromes). Some adenomas are too small to be seen macroscopically but can still cause clinical symptoms.

== Histopathology ==
Adenoma is a benign tumor of glandular tissue, such as the mucosa of stomach, small intestine, and colon, in which tumor cells form glands or gland-like structures. In hollow organs (digestive tract), the adenoma grows into the lumen - adenomatous polyp or polypoid adenoma. Adenomatous polyps may be classified based on morphology in order to identify lesions at increased risk of malignant transformation. For example, adenomatous polyps in the colon may be pedunculated (lobular head with a long slender stalk) or sessile (broad base).

The adenomatous proliferation is characterized by different degrees of cell dysplasia (atypia or loss of normal differentiation of epithelium) irregular cells with hyperchromatic nuclei, stratified or pseudostratified nuclei, nucleolus, decreased mucosecretion, and mitosis. The architecture may be tubular, villous, or tubulo-villous. Basement membrane and muscularis mucosae are intact.

== Locations ==
=== Colon ===
Adenomas of the colon, also called adenomatous polyps, are quite prevalent. They are found commonly at colonoscopy. They are removed because of their tendency to become malignant and to lead to colon cancer.

Ashkenazi Jews have a 6% higher risk rate of getting adenomas, and then colon cancer, than do the general population, so it is important that they have regular actual colonoscopies, and specifically none of the less invasive diagnostic methods.

=== Renal ===
This is a tumor that is most often small and asymptomatic, and is derived from renal tubules. It may be a precursor lesion to renal carcinoma.

=== Adrenal ===
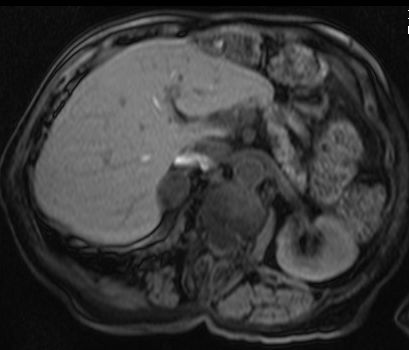
MRI scan T1 with fat saturation - adrenal adenoma

Adrenal adenomas are common, and are often found on the abdomen, usually not as the focus of investigation; they are usually incidental findings. About one in 10,000 is malignant. Thus, a biopsy is rarely called for, especially if the lesion is homogeneous and smaller than 3 centimeters. Follow-up images in three to six months can confirm the stability of the growth.

While some adrenal adenomas do not secrete hormones at all, often some secrete cortisol, causing Cushing's syndrome, aldosterone causing Conn's syndrome, or androgens causing hyperandrogenism.

=== Thyroid ===
About one in 10 people is found to have solitary thyroid nodules. Investigation is required because a small percentage of these are malignant. Biopsy usually confirms the growth to be an adenoma, but, sometimes, excision at surgery is required, especially when the cells found at biopsy are of the follicular type.

=== Pituitary ===
Pituitary adenomas are seen in 10% of neurological patients. A lot of them remain undiagnosed. Treatment is usually surgical, to which patients generally respond well. The most common subtype, prolactinoma, is seen more often in women, and is frequently diagnosed during pregnancy as the hormone progesterone increases its growth. Medical therapy with cabergoline or bromocriptine generally suppresses prolactinomas; progesterone antagonist therapy has not proven to be successful.

=== Parathyroid ===
An adenoma of a parathyroid gland may secrete inappropriately high amounts of parathyroid hormone and thereby cause primary hyperparathyroidism.

=== Liver ===
Hepatic adenomas are a rare benign tumour of the liver, which may present with hepatomegaly or other symptoms.

=== Breast ===
Breast adenomas are called fibroadenomas. They are often very small and difficult to detect. Often there are no symptoms. Treatments can include a needle biopsy, and/or removal.

=== Appendix ===
Adenomas can also appear in the appendix. The condition is extremely rare. The most common version is called cystadenoma. They are usually discovered in the course of examination of the tissue following an appendectomy. If the appendix has ruptured and a tumor is present, this presents challenges, especially if malignant cells have formed and thus spread to the abdomen.

=== Bronchial ===
Bronchial adenomas are adenomas in the bronchi. They may cause carcinoid syndrome, a type of paraneoplastic syndrome.

=== Sebaceous ===
A sebaceous adenoma is a cutaneous condition characterized by a slow-growing tumour usually presenting as a pink, flesh-coloured, or yellow papule or nodule.

=== Salivary glands ===
Most salivary gland tumors are benign – that is, they are not cancer and will not spread to other parts of the body. These tumors are almost never life-threatening. There are many types of benign salivary gland tumors, with names such as adenomas, oncocytomas, Warthin tumors, and benign mixed tumors (also known as pleomorphic adenomas). Benign tumors are almost always cured by surgery. Very rarely, they may become cancer if left untreated for a long time or if they are not completely removed and grow back. It's not clear exactly how benign tumors become cancers. There are many types of salivary gland cancers. Normal salivary glands are made up of several different types of cells, and tumors can start in any of these cell types. Salivary gland cancers are named according to which of these cell types they most look like when seen under a microscope. The main types of cancers are described below. Doctors usually give salivary cancers a grade (from 1 to 3, or from low to high), based on how abnormal the cancers look under a microscope. The grade gives a rough idea of how quickly it is likely to grow and spread.

- Grade 1 cancers (also called low grade or well differentiated) look very much like normal salivary gland cells. They tend to grow slowly and have a good outcome (prognosis).
- Grade 2 cancers (also called intermediate grade or moderately differentiated) have an appearance and outlook that is between grade 1 and grade 3 cancers.
- Grade 3 cancers (also called high grade or poorly differentiated) look very different from normal cells and often grow and/or spread quickly. The outlook for these cancers is usually not as good as for lower grade cancers.

=== Prostate ===
Prostate adenoma develops from the periurethral glands at the site of the median or lateral lobes.

== Treatment ==
A physician's response to detecting an adenoma in a patient will vary according to the type and location of the adenoma among other factors. Different adenomas will grow at different rates, but typically physicians can anticipate the rates of growth because some types of common adenomas progress similarly in most patients. Two common responses are removing the adenoma with surgery and then monitoring the patient according to established guidelines.

One common example of treatment is the response recommended by specialty professional organizations upon removing adenomatous polyps from a patient. In the common case of removing one or two of these polyps from the colon from a patient with no particular risk factors for cancer, thereafter the best practice is to resume surveillance colonoscopy after 5–10 years rather than repeating it more frequently than the standard recommendation.
