= Glucocorticoid receptor =

Receptor to which cortisol and other glucocorticoids bind

NR3C1
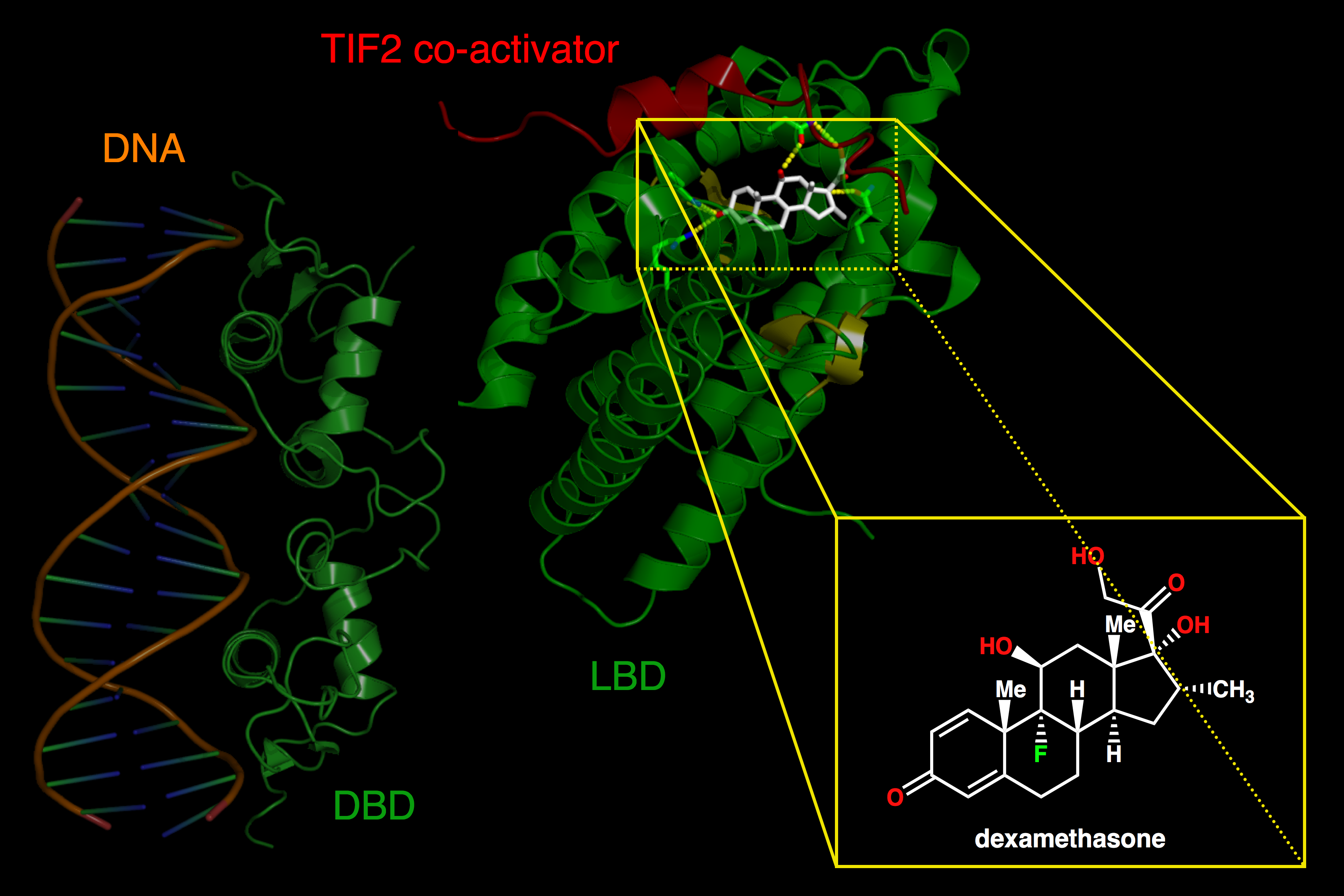

Identifiers
- Aliases: NR3C1, GCCR, GCR, GCRST, GR, GRL, nuclear receptor subfamily 3 group C member 1, Glucocorticoid Receptor
- External IDs: OMIM: 138040; MGI: 95824; GeneCards: NR3C1
Available structures
PDB	Ortholog search: PDBe RCSB
PDB	List of PDB id codes 1M2Z, 1NHZ, 1P93, 3BQD, 3CLD, 3E7C, 3H52, 3K22, 3K23, 4CSJ, 4HN5, 4HN6, 4LSJ, 4MDD, 4P6W, 4P6X, 5CBY, 5CBX, 4UDC, 4UDD, 5CBZ, 5CC1, 5EMQ, 5EMC, 5EMP

Gene location (Human)
Chr.	Chromosome 5 (human)
Band	5q31.3	Start	143,277,931 bp
Band	5q31.3	End	143,435,512 bp

Gene location (Mouse)
Chr.	Chromosome 18 (mouse)
Band	18 B3|18 21.09 cM	Start	39,543,598 bp
Band	18 B3|18 21.09 cM	End	39,652,474 bp
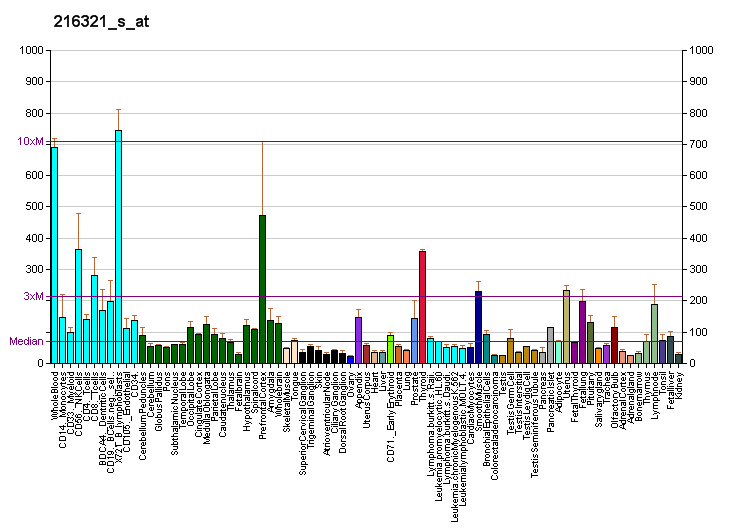

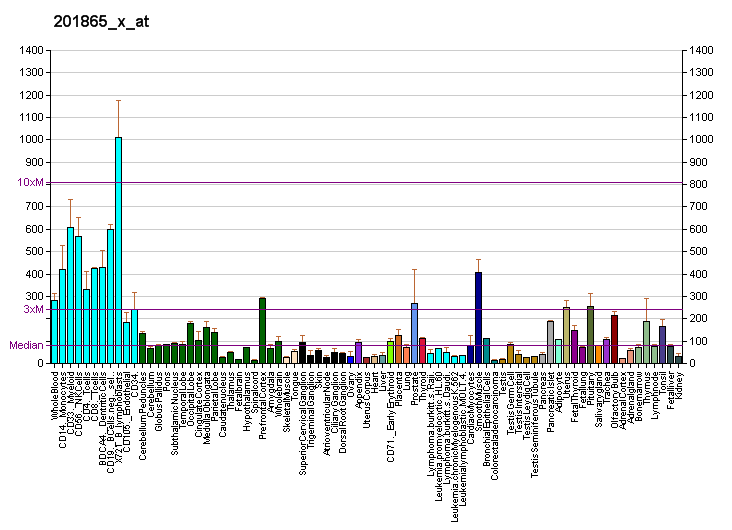

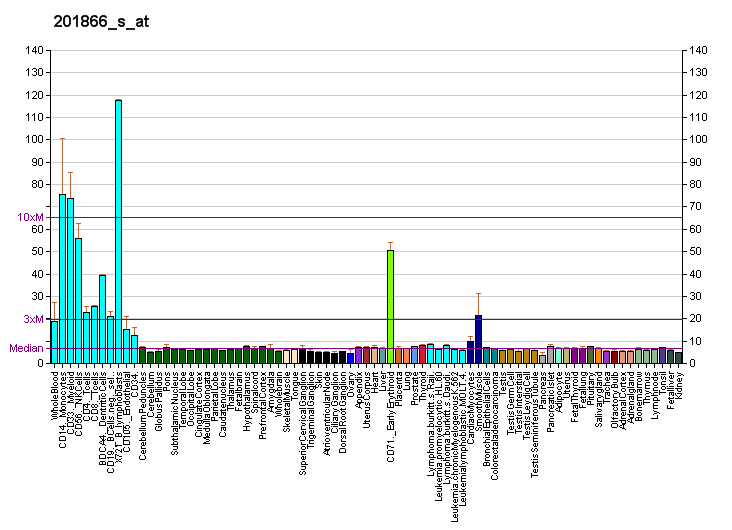
RNA expression pattern
Bgee	Human / Mouse (ortholog); Top expressed in: endothelial cell; tibia; cartilage tissue; Skeletal muscle tissue of rectus abdominis; Brodmann area 23; superficial temporal artery; visceral pleura; synovial joint; nipple; parietal pleura / Top expressed in: median eminence; left lung; ankle; left lung lobe; skin of external ear; medial dorsal nucleus; lobe of cerebellum; ciliary body; triceps brachii muscle; arcuate nucleus; More reference expression data
BioGPS	More reference expression data
Gene ontology
Molecular function	steroid hormone binding; DNA binding; sequence-specific DNA binding; DNA-binding transcription factor activity; zinc ion binding; DNA-binding transcription activator activity, RNA polymerase II-specific; glucocorticoid receptor activity; nuclear receptor activity; metal ion binding; RNA polymerase II cis-regulatory region sequence-specific DNA binding; steroid hormone receptor activity; steroid binding; protein binding; lipid binding; RNA binding; SUMO binding; Hsp90 protein binding; DNA-binding transcription factor activity, RNA polymerase II-specific; protein kinase binding
Cellular component	cytoplasm; nucleoplasm; mitochondrial matrix; mitochondrion; nucleus; cytoskeleton; spindle; microtubule organizing center; cytosol; nuclear speck; protein-containing complex
Biological process	cellular response to steroid hormone stimulus; regulation of transcription, DNA-templated; glucocorticoid mediated signaling pathway; transcription by RNA polymerase II; transcription initiation from RNA polymerase II promoter; glucocorticoid receptor signaling pathway; signal transduction; steroid hormone mediated signaling pathway; cell cycle; cell division; apoptotic process; chromosome segregation; negative regulation of transcription by RNA polymerase II; transcription, DNA-templated; cellular response to dexamethasone stimulus; cellular response to transforming growth factor beta stimulus; positive regulation of transcription by RNA polymerase II; cellular response to glucocorticoid stimulus; chromatin organization; positive regulation of pri-miRNA transcription by RNA polymerase II
Sources:Amigo / QuickGO
Orthologs
Databases	NCBI: entry; OMA: entry
Species	Human	Mouse
Entrez	2908	14815
Ensembl	ENSG00000113580	ENSMUSG00000024431
UniProt	P04150; Q3MSN4	P06537
RefSeq (mRNA)	NM_000176; NM_001018074; NM_001018075; NM_001018076; NM_001018077 NM_001020825; NM_001024094; NM_001204258; NM_001204259; NM_001204260; NM_001204261; NM_001204262; NM_001204263; NM_001204264; NM_001204265; NM_001364180; NM_001364181; NM_001364182; NM_001364183; NM_001364184; NM_001364185	NM_008173; NM_001361209; NM_001361210; NM_001361211; NM_001361212
RefSeq (protein)	NP_000167; NP_001018084; NP_001018085; NP_001018086; NP_001018087 NP_001018661; NP_001019265; NP_001191187; NP_001191188; NP_001191189; NP_001191190; NP_001191191; NP_001191192; NP_001191193; NP_001191194; NP_001351109; NP_001351110; NP_001351111; NP_001351112; NP_001351113; NP_001351114; NP_000167.1; NP_001018084.1; NP_001018085.1; NP_001018086.1; NP_001018087.1; NP_001018661.1; NP_001019265.1; NP_001191187.1; NP_001191188.1; NP_001191189.1; NP_001191190.1; NP_001191191.1; NP_001191192.1; NP_001191193.1	NP_001348138; NP_001348139; NP_001348140; NP_001348141; NP_032199
Location (UCSC)	Chr 5: 143.28 – 143.44 Mb	Chr 18: 39.54 – 39.65 Mb
PubMed search
- Wikidata
View/Edit Human	View/Edit Mouse

The glucocorticoid receptor (GR or GCR) also known by its gene name NR3C1 (nuclear receptor subfamily 3, group C, member 1) is the steroid receptor for glucocorticoids such as cortisol.

The GR is expressed in almost every cell in the body and regulates genes controlling the development, metabolism, inflammation, and immune response. Because the receptor gene is expressed in several forms, it has many different (pleiotropic) effects in different parts of the body and in the context of different diseases.

GR is a steroid receptor and thus its canonical action is similar to other steroid receptors. The unbound receptor resides in the cytosol of the cell. When glucocorticoids bind to the receptor, GR translocates to the nucleus of the cell where it acts as a transcription factor. The activated GR complex up-regulates the expression of anti-inflammatory proteins in the nucleus or represses the expression of pro-inflammatory proteins in the cytosol (by preventing the translocation of other transcription factors from the cytosol into the nucleus).

In humans, the GR protein is encoded by NR3C1 gene which is located on chromosome 5 (5q31).

== Structure ==
Like the other steroid receptors, GR is modular in structure and contains the following domains (labeled A - F):

- A/B - N-terminal regulatory domain
- C - DNA-binding domain (DBD)
- D - hinge region
- E - ligand-binding domain (LBD)
- F - C-terminal domain

== Ligand binding and response ==
In the absence of hormone, the glucocorticoid receptor (GR) resides in the cytosol complexed with a variety of proteins including heat shock protein 90 (hsp90), the heat shock protein 70 (hsp70) and the protein FKBP4 (FK506-binding protein 4). The endogenous glucocorticoid hormone cortisol diffuses through the cell membrane into the cytoplasm and binds to the glucocorticoid receptor (GR) resulting in the release of the heat shock proteins. The resulting activated form GR has two principal mechanisms of action, transactivation, and transrepression, described below.

=== Transactivation ===
A direct mechanism of action involves homodimerization of the receptor, translocation via active transport into the nucleus, and binding to specific DNA response elements activating gene transcription. This mechanism of action is referred to as transactivation. The biological response depends on the cell type.

=== Transrepression ===
In the absence of activated GR, other transcription factors such as NF-κB or AP-1 themselves are able to transactivate target genes. However activated GR can complex with these other transcription factors and prevent them from binding their target genes and hence repress the expression of genes that are normally upregulated by NF-κB or AP-1. This indirect mechanism of action is referred to as transrepression. GR transrepression via NF-κB and AP-1 is restricted only to certain cell types, and is not considered the universal mechanism for IκBα repression.

== Clinical significance ==
The GR is abnormal in familial glucocorticoid resistance.

In central nervous system structures, the glucocorticoid receptor is gaining interest as a novel representative of neuroendocrine integration, functioning as a major component of endocrine influence — specifically the stress response — upon the brain. The receptor is now implicated in both short and long-term adaptations seen in response to stressors and may be critical to the understanding of psychological disorders, including some or all subtypes of depression and post-traumatic stress disorder (PTSD). Indeed, long-standing observations such as the mood dysregulations typical of Cushing's disease demonstrate the role of corticosteroids in regulating psychologic state; recent advances have demonstrated interactions with norepinephrine and serotonin at the neural level.

In preeclampsia (a hypertensive disorder commonly occurring in pregnant women), the level of a miRNA sequence possibly targeting this protein is elevated in the blood of the mother. Rather, the placenta elevates the level of exosomes containing this miRNA, which can result in inhibition of translation of molecule. Clinical significance of this information is not yet clarified.

In castration-resistant prostate cancer the glucocorticoid receptor has been shown to be upregulated, transcribing genes that are usually regulated by the androgen receptor. This upregulation drives resistance to enzalutamide, a drug used to treat prostate cancer.

== Ligands ==
=== Agonists ===
- Hydrocortisone (cortisol)
- Prednisone
- Prednisolone
- Methylprednisolone
- Dexamethasone
- Betamethasone
- Triamcinolone
- Other corticosteroids

=== Selective glucocorticoid receptor modulators ===
- AZD-5423
- CORT-108297
- Dagrocorat (PF-00251802)
- Dazucorilant (CORT-113176)
- Deflazacort
- Fosdagrocorat (PF-04171327)
- Mapracorat (BOL-303242-X, ZK-245186)
- Miricorilant (CORT-118335)

=== Antagonists ===
- Ketoconazole
- Mifepristone
- Relacorilant (CORT-125134)

== Interactions ==
Glucocorticoid receptor has been shown to interact with:

- BAG1,
- CEBPB,
- CREBBP,
- DAP3,
- DAXX,
- HSP90AA1,
- HNRPU,
- MED1,
- MED14,
- Mineralocorticoid receptor,
- NRIP1,
- NCOR1,
- NCOA1,
- NCOA2,
- NCOA3,
- POU2F1,
- RANBP9,
- RELA,
- SMAD3,
- SMARCD1,
- SMARCA4
- STAT3,
- STAT5B,
- Thioredoxin,
- TRIM28, and
- YWHAH.

== See also ==
- Membrane glucocorticoid receptor
- Selective glucocorticoid receptor agonist (SEGRA)
