= Generalized glucocorticoid resistance =

- Other names: Chrousos syndrome
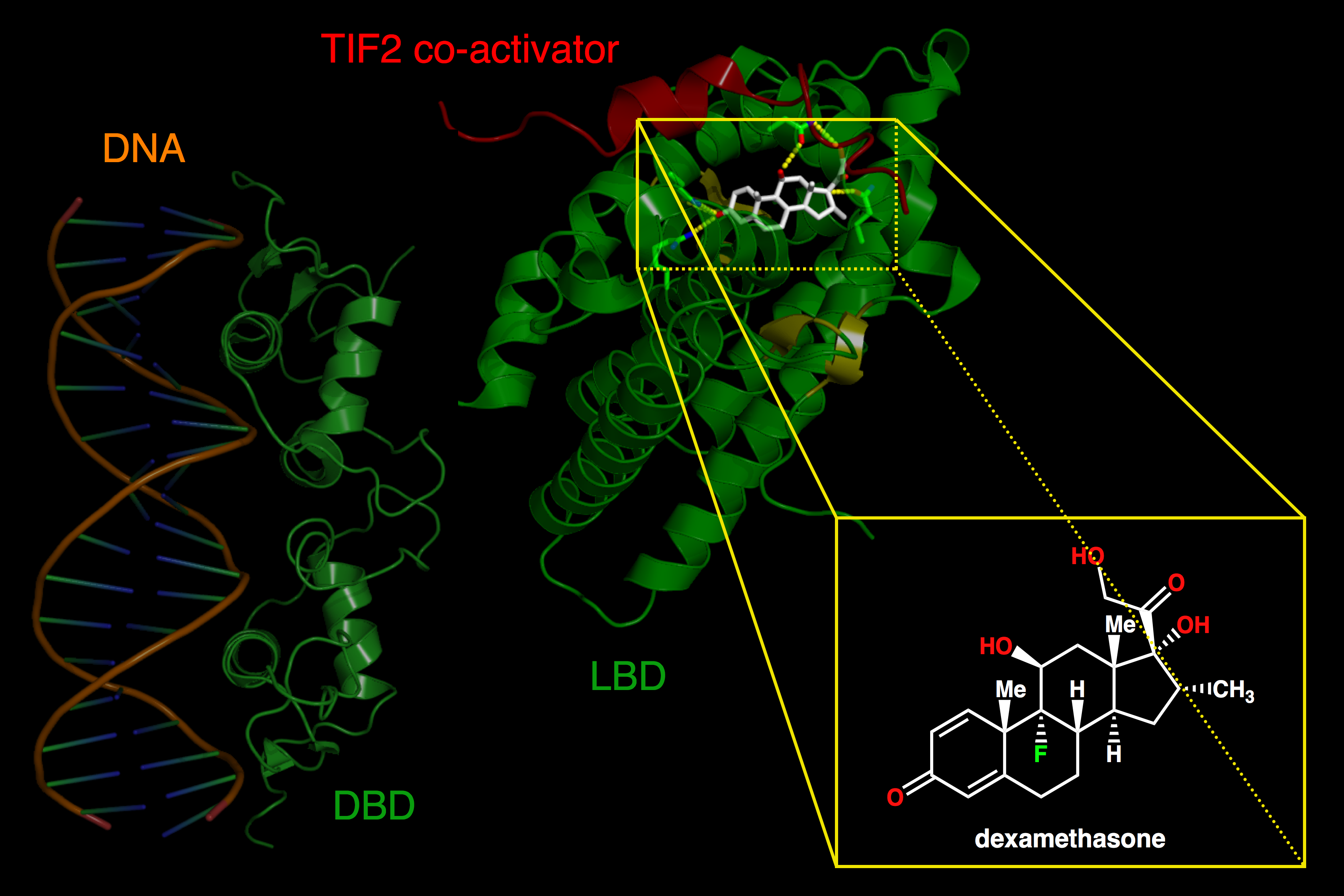
- Left. DNA-binding domains of a glucocorticoid receptor homodimer in the nucleus interacting with DNA. Right. Binding of synthetic glucocorticoid dexamethasone to ligand-binding domain of receptor in cytoplasm.
- Specialty: Endocrinology

Generalized glucocorticoid resistance or Chrousos syndrome is an extraordinarily rare genetic disorder that can run in families or be sporadic. It is characterized by partial or generalized target-tissue insensitivity to glucocorticoids.

The clinical spectrum includes severe, potentially fatal conditions like hypoglycemia, alkalosis, or severe hypokalemia, as well as completely asymptomatic forms. The disease's most prevalent symptom is fatigue.

The elevated 24-hour urinary free cortisol (UFC) excretion in the absence of clinical signs of hypercortisolism and the elevated serum cortisol concentrations point to the diagnosis of generalized glucocorticoid resistance.

The goal of treatment for generalized glucocorticoid resistance is to reduce excessive ACTH secretion, which in turn reduces the production of more adrenal steroids that have androgenic and mineralocorticoid properties. High dosages of synthetic glucocorticoids that spare mineralocorticoids, like dexamethasone, are used as part of the treatment.

== Signs and symptoms ==
Individuals who have generalized glucocorticoid resistance may exhibit biochemical hypercortisolism in the absence of Cushing's syndrome symptoms. The condition's clinical phenotype varies from cases with no symptoms to signs of excess mineralocorticoids in the body such as hypokalemic alkalosis and hypertension and/or androgen excess, including oligospermia in males, menstrual irregularities, hypo fertility, and amenorrhea in females, precocious puberty, male-pattern hair loss, acne, hirsutism, and ambiguous genitalia at birth with 46, XX.

In rare instances, glucocorticoid deficiency has been reported in the following cases: hypoglycemia, severe hypertension, easy "fatigability" with feeding, growth hormone deficiency, and generalized seizures in a 2-year-old girl, adult patients with chronic fatigue, and a newborn with hypoglycemia, hypokalemia, and increased arterial pressure.

== Causes ==
De novo genetic defects (point mutations, deletions, or insertions) in the NR3C1 gene can cause sporadic cases of Chrousos syndrome, or it can be inherited in an autosomal recessive or dominant manner. Defective human glucocorticoid receptors in the hypothalamus and pituitary cause impaired glucocorticoid negative feedback loops in patients with Chrousos syndrome, which leads to compensatory hypersecretion of adrenocorticotropic hormone (ACTH), corticotropin-releasing hormone (CRH), and arginine vasopressin (AVP).

== Mechanism ==
Steroid hormones known as "glucocorticoids" are produced in the zona fasciculata of the adrenal cortex and numerous other extra-adrenal organs, such as the skin, thymus, and gut. These lipophilic molecules are essential for the maintenance of both resting as well as threatened homeostasis and are secreted in the circulatory system in reaction to stressors and also in an ultradian and circadian manner.

== Diagnosis ==
The elevated 24-hour urinary free cortisol (UFC) excretion with the absence of clinical signs of hypercortisolism and the elevated serum cortisol concentrations point to the diagnosis of generalized glucocorticoid resistance. ACTH plasma concentrations can range from low to high. To confirm the diagnosis, peripheral blood mononuclear cells must be used in thymidine incorporation and dexamethasone-binding assays in conjunction with sequencing of the human glucocorticoid receptor gene.

When diagnosing generalized glucocorticoid resistance, the differential diagnosis consists of additional factors that can lead to hyperandrogenism or virilization, including congenital adrenal hyperplasia, polyendocrine metabolic ovarian syndrome (PMOS), and idiopathic hirsutism; hyperaldosteronism, essential hypertension, and additional mineralocorticoid-induced hypertensive disorders; circumstances like a typical pregnancy and estrogen therapy that are linked to increased serum concentrations of corticosteroid-binding globulin; pseudo-Cushing's conditions, like melancholic depression and generalized anxiety; and mild variations of Cushing's disease, in which normal or slightly elevated ACTH concentrations coexist with hypercortisolism.

== Treatment ==
The goal of treatment for generalized glucocorticoid resistance is to reduce excessive ACTH secretion, which in turn reduces the production of more adrenal steroids that have androgenic and mineralocorticoid properties. High dosages of mineralocorticoid-sparing synthetic glucocorticoids, like dexamethasone, are used as a form of treatment to activate the mutant and/or wild-type hGRα and suppress the affected subjects' natural secretion of ACTH.

== See also ==
- Cushing's syndrome
- Pseudo-Cushing's syndrome
