= Mizacorat =

Chemical compound

Clinical data
- Other names: AZD9567

Legal status
- Legal status: Investigational

Identifiers
- IUPAC name: 2,2-Difluoro-N-[(1R,2S)-3-methyl-1-[1-(1-methyl-6-oxopyridin-3-yl)indazol-5-yl]oxy-1-phenylbutan-2-yl]propanamide
- CAS Number: 1893415-00-3
- PubChem CID: 121248172
- IUPHAR/BPS: 9812
- ChemSpider: 57617761
- UNII: GGK40O1O85
- ChEMBL: ChEMBL4207852

Chemical and physical data
- Formula: C_{27}H_{28}F_{2}N_{4}O_{3}
- Molar mass: 494.543 g·mol^{−1}
- 3D model (JSmol): Interactive image
- SMILES: CC(C)[C@@H]([C@@H](C1=CC=CC=C1)OC2=CC3=C(C=C2)N(N=C3)C4=CN(C(=O)C=C4)C)NC(=O)C(C)(F)F
- InChI: InChI=1S/C27H28F2N4O3/c1-17(2)24(31-26(35)27(3,28)29)25(18-8-6-5-7-9-18)36-21-11-12-22-19(14-21)15-30-33(22)20-10-13-23(34)32(4)16-20/h5-17,24-25H,1-4H3,(H,31,35)/t24-,25+/m0/s1; Key:ZQFNDBISEYQVRR-LOSJGSFVSA-N

Mizacorat (AZD9567) is an investigational selective glucocorticoid receptor modulator that has a better ratio of therapeutic effect to adverse effects compared to prednisolone according to preliminary studies. It is developed by AstraZeneca for rheumatoid arthritis.
