= CORT-108297 =

Clinical data
- Other names: CORT108297; ADS-108297; ADS108297
- Routes of administration: Oral
- Drug class: Antiglucocorticoid; Selective glucocorticoid receptor modulator
- ATC code: None

Identifiers
- IUPAC name: (4aR)-4a-(ethoxymethyl)-1-(4-fluorophenyl)-6-[4-(trifluoromethyl)phenyl]sulfonyl-4,5,7,8-tetrahydropyrazolo[5,4-g]isoquinoline
- CAS Number: 1018679-79-2
- PubChem CID: 44454750
- ChemSpider: 23322313
- UNII: A17W0640NB
- ChEMBL: ChEMBL271220
- CompTox Dashboard (EPA): DTXSID70144304

Chemical and physical data
- Formula: C_{26}H_{25}F_{4}N_{3}O_{3}S
- Molar mass: 535.56 g·mol^{−1}
- 3D model (JSmol): Interactive image
- SMILES: CCOC[C@]12CC3=C(C=C1CCN(C2)S(=O)(=O)C4=CC=C(C=C4)C(F)(F)F)N(N=C3)C5=CC=C(C=C5)F
- InChI: InChI=1S/C26H25F4N3O3S/c1-2-36-17-25-14-18-15-31-33(22-7-5-21(27)6-8-22)24(18)13-20(25)11-12-32(16-25)37(34,35)23-9-3-19(4-10-23)26(28,29)30/h3-10,13,15H,2,11-12,14,16-17H2,1H3/t25-/m1/s1; Key:SLKURXRZHJOZOD-RUZDIDTESA-N

CORT-108297, also known as ADS-108297, is a nonsteroidal selective glucocorticoid receptor modulator (SEGRM) with mixed glucocorticoid and antiglucocorticoid actions which is under development for the treatment of Alzheimer's disease, cognition disorders, memory disorders, and post-traumatic stress disorder (PTSD). It was also being developed for treatment of other psychiatric disorders and weight gain, but development for these indications was discontinued. The drug is taken by mouth. As of November 2022, CORT-108297 is in phase 2 clinical trials for the aforementioned active indications.

== See also ==
- List of investigational cognition and memory disorder drugs
- Dagrocorat (PF-00251802)
- Dazucorilant (CORT-113176)
- Miricorilant (CORT-118335)
- Relacorilant (CORT-125134)
