= Glucocorticoids in hippocampal development =

HippoCampus

Human hippocampus
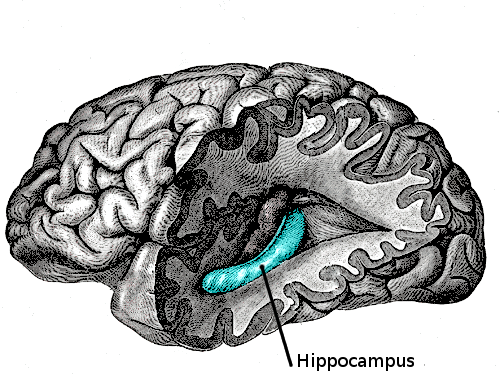
Lateral view of the hippocampus (blue) deep to the cerebral cortex.

Hippocampus (red) in relation to other brain structures.

The hippocampus is an area of the brain integral to learning and memory. Its removal can result in the inability to form new memories (anterograde amnesia) as most famously demonstrated in a patient referred to as HM. The unique morphology of the hippocampus can be appreciated without the use of special stains and this distinct circuitry has helped further the understanding of neuronal signal potentiation. Glucocorticoid signaling plays a major role in the development of the hippocampus.

== Hippocampal development ==
=== Overview ===
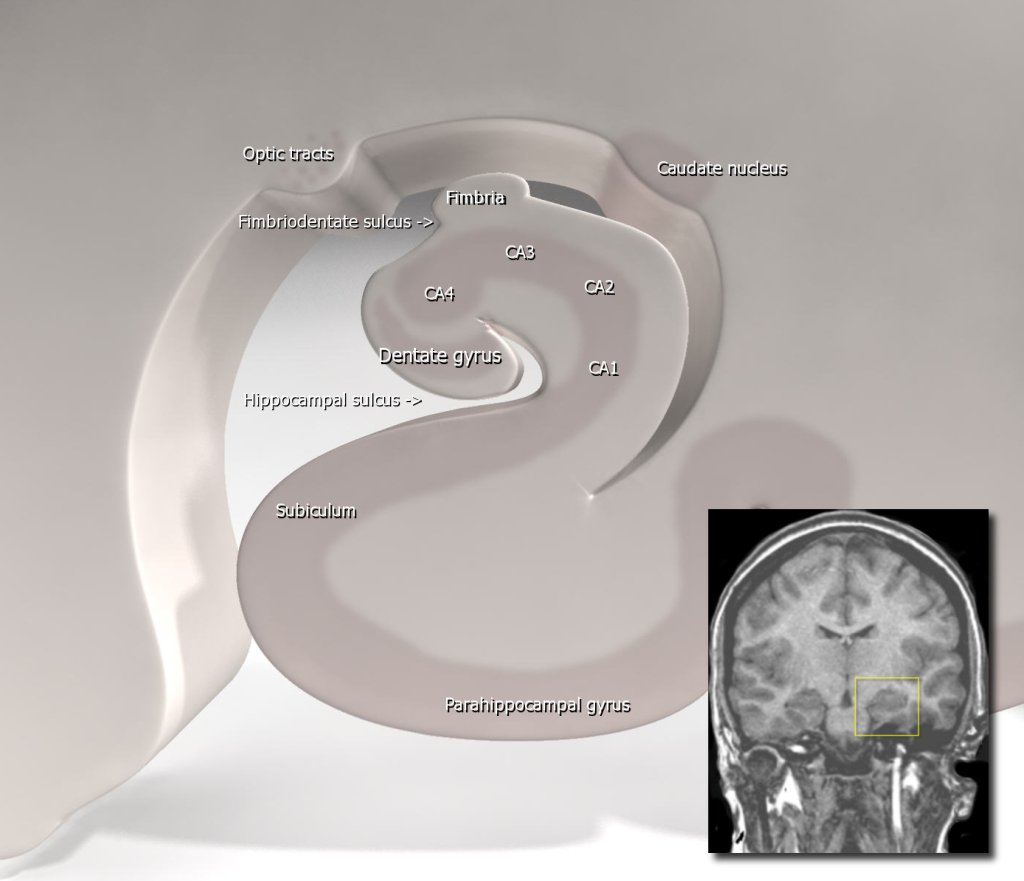
Hippocampus in relation to the lateral ventricle

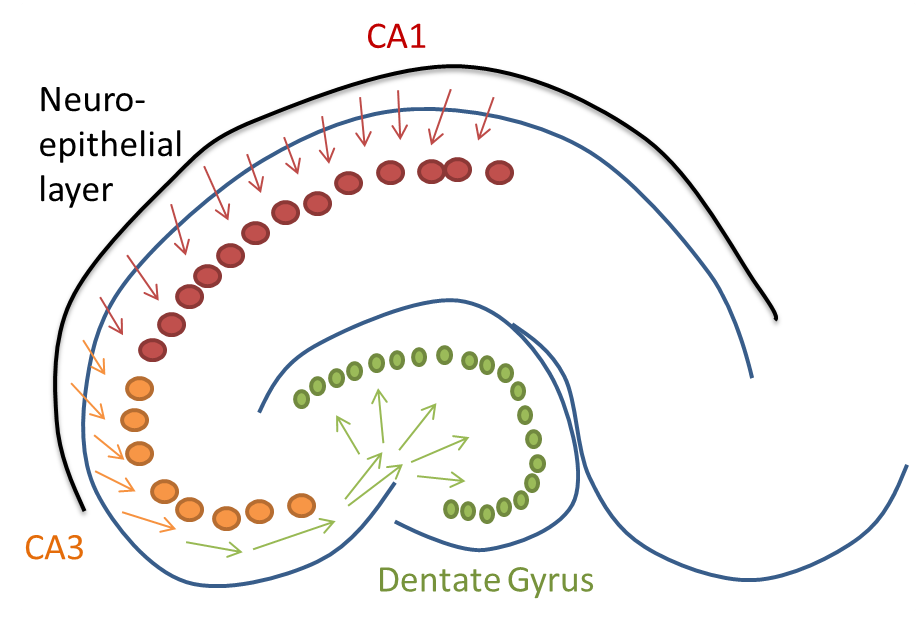
Migration of cells to CA1 (red), CA3 (orange), and dentate gyrus (green).

The hippocampus arises from the medial telencephalon. In lower mammals, the hippocampus is located dorsally. Considerable expansion of the cerebral cortex in higher mammals (notably in humans) displaces the hippocampus ventrally where it protrudes inferiorly into the lateral ventricles.

=== Principal cells ===
Neural progenitors that become hippocampal principal neurons (pyramidal and granular cells) arise from the ventricular zone of the lateral ventricle. In contrast to neural proliferation that leads to cortical formation, hippocampal precursors are produced directly in the ventricular zone because there is no subventricular zone or outer subventricular zone adjacent to the hippocampus. Pyramidal CA1 and CA3 precursor cells, therefore, do not have to migrate far to reach their final destination. The figure to the right indicates migration of pyramidal neurons forming the CA3 (orange) and CA1 (red) cell body layers. These cells populate the hippocampus early in development and can be morphologically distinguished from one another in the embryo by 4 months. Granular cells populate the hippocampus slightly after pyramidal cell migration. These cells have farther distance to travel and follow along the pyramidal cells before entering the hilus; this is represented in the figure as the continuation of migration with the green arrows. Granular cell precursors that will populate the dentate gyrus proliferate locally in the hilus. This area, also known as the subgranular zone, retains a portion of neurogenic precursors in the adult.

=== Role of reelin ===
As in the cortex, it is believed that reelin plays an important role in layering of hippocampal neurons through inhibition of migration. Reelin knockout mice lack a single, distinct pyramidal cell body layer due to excess migration. Unexpectedly, these mice have reduced migration into dentate gyrus. The mechanism of this involves disruption in radial glial scaffolding.

== Glucocorticoid signaling ==
=== Overview ===
Cortisol is the primary glucocorticoid produced in humans (equivalent to rodent corticosterone). This steroid hormone is both synthesized and released from the adrenal cortex in response to physical or emotional stress. Additionally, basal serum levels of cortisol display circadian variations. Cortisol receptors are located throughout the body and are involved in a variety of processes including inflammation and lung maturation.

=== Adult hippocampus ===
The adult hippocampus is highly enriched in type I (mineralocorticoid, MR) and type II (glucocorticoid, GR) glucocorticoid receptors. Despite receptor name, cortisol has ten times greater affinity for MRs than GRs. At basal GC levels, most MRs are activate. Therefore, increasing concentrations of cortisol will preferentially activate GRs. The role these receptors play in cognition is discussed elsewhere.

=== Developing hippocampus ===
Despite having a high level of receptor expression, the physiological role of glucocorticoid signaling in the developing hippocampus is not well defined. Animal studies have shown fetal exposure to elevated levels of GCs (either by direct corticosterone mimetic injection or stressing of the mother) has adverse outcomes. In addition to having reduced birth weights, stressed rat pups have a decreased ability to regulate the hypothalamus-pituitary-adrenal axis. The hippocampus provides negative feedback to this loop and stressed pups have less sensitive glucocorticoid signaling resulting in elevated levels of glucocorticoids basally and an exaggerated response during stress. As adults, these rats can have impaired cognitive function. Understanding the role of glucocorticoid exposure is important; mothers at risk of preterm delivery are commonly given dexamethasone, a GR agonist, to accelerate fetal lung development and reduce morbidity associated with prematurity. These animals studies have found that postnatal care to prenatally stressed animals can reverse the adverse effects of glucocorticoid signaling. More research is needed to understand the role of glucocorticoids in the context of human hippocampal development.
