= Dazucorilant =

Glucocorticoid receptor modulator

Clinical data
- Other names: CORT-113176

Identifiers
- IUPAC name: [(4aR)-1-(4-fluorophenyl)-6-[4-(trifluoromethyl)phenyl]sulfonyl-4,5,7,8-tetrahydropyrazolo[3,4-g]isoquinolin-4a-yl]-pyridin-2-ylmethanone
- CAS Number: 1496508-34-9
- PubChem CID: 72192163
- DrugBank: DB18025
- ChemSpider: 58919795
- UNII: HR4RD5RBJ6
- KEGG: D12638
- ChEMBL: ChEMBL3734774

Chemical and physical data
- Formula: C_{29}H_{22}F_{4}N_{4}O_{3}S
- Molar mass: 582.57 g·mol^{−1}
- 3D model (JSmol): Interactive image
- SMILES: C1CN(C[C@@]2(C1=CC3=C(C2)C=NN3C4=CC=C(C=C4)F)C(=O)C5=CC=CC=N5)S(=O)(=O)C6=CC=C(C=C6)C(F)(F)F
- InChI: InChI=1S/C29H22F4N4O3S/c30-22-6-8-23(9-7-22)37-26-15-21-12-14-36(41(39,40)24-10-4-20(5-11-24)29(31,32)33)18-28(21,16-19(26)17-35-37)27(38)25-3-1-2-13-34-25/h1-11,13,15,17H,12,14,16,18H2/t28-/m0/s1; Key:VXOBXKQLNWYQPQ-NDEPHWFRSA-N

Dazucorilant (CORT-113176) is an example of a selective glucocorticoid receptor modulator that is in clinical development. It is expected to have uses in the treatment of neurodegenerative diseases, Alzheimer's disease and Huntington's chorea, for example.

== See also ==
- CORT-108297
- Miricorilant
- Nivazol – has the same pyrazole ring moiety
- Relacorilant
