= Miricorilant =

Chemical compound

Clinical data
- Other names: CORT-118335

Legal status
- Legal status: Investigational

Identifiers
- IUPAC name: trans-6-(4-phenylcyclohexyl)-5-[[3-(trifluoromethyl)phenyl]methyl]-1H-pyrimidine-2,4-dione
- CAS Number: 1400902-13-7
- PubChem CID: 66550324
- IUPHAR/BPS: 10059
- DrugBank: DB16234
- ChemSpider: 76826991
- UNII: 311Y5GV21M
- KEGG: D11667
- ChEMBL: ChEMBL4297602

Chemical and physical data
- Formula: C_{24}H_{23}F_{3}N_{2}O_{2}
- Molar mass: 428.455 g·mol^{−1}
- 3D model (JSmol): Interactive image
- SMILES: C1CC(CCC1C2=CC=CC=C2)C3=C(C(=O)NC(=O)N3)CC4=CC(=CC=C4)C(F)(F)F
- InChI: InChI=1/C24H23F3N2O2/c25-24(26,27)19-8-4-5-15(13-19)14-20-21(28-23(31)29-22(20)30)18-11-9-17(10-12-18)16-6-2-1-3-7-16/h1-8,13,17-18H,9-12,14H2,(H2,28,29,30,31)/t17-,18-; Key:GVVUZBSCYAVFTI-IYARVYRRNA-N

Miricorilant (CORT-118335) is a small molecule that works as a selective glucocorticoid receptor modulator and mineralcorticoid receptor antagonist. It was developed by Corcept Therapeutics for nonalcoholic steatohepatitis and the weight gain associated with the drug olanzapine.

== See also ==
- CORT-108297
- Dazucorilant
- Relacorilant
