= Adrenalism =

Medical condition

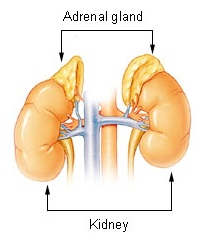
Diagram of the kidney and the adrenal gland. The adrenal gland is directly superior to the kidney.

Adrenalism describes the condition of an excessive or substandard secretion of hormones related to the adrenal glands, which are found directly superior to the kidneys. Adrenalism can be further distinguished as hyperadrenalism, referring to the excessive secretion of hormones, and hypoadrenalism, referring to the insufficient secretion of hormones.

The symptoms related to hyperadrenalism are known as Cushing's syndrome, and are caused by overproduction of corticosteroids, aldosterone, and androgenic steroids. Symptoms related to hypoadrenalism, such as Addison's disease, are caused by the underproductions of the hormones listed above. Furthermore, adrenalism may be caused by other external factors, which will be further discussed in the article.

== Etiology ==
The adrenal glands produce important hormones that have specific roles in the homeostasis of the body, which are regulated by other glands. These hormones include aldosterone, a mineralocorticoid that regulates the amount of salt in tissue and body fluids, cortisol, a glucocorticoid that regulates metabolism and usage of macronutrients in the body, and sex hormones, such as androgens and estrogen that promote the development of secondary sex characteristics. The adrenal glands also produce epinephrine (adrenaline) and norepinephrine (noradrenaline).

The production of cortisol is regulated by the hypothalamic–pituitary–adrenal axis and the hormones that are produced in the axis, namely corticotropin-releasing hormone (CRH) and adrenocorticotropic hormone (ACTH). The CRH produced by the hypothalamus stimulates the pituitary gland to produce ACTH, which stimulates the adrenal gland to produce cortisol. A negative feedback loop is formed as high levels of cortisol inhibit the hormones produced in the axis.

The production of aldosterone is regulated via the renin-angiotensin II-aldosterone system, a system composed of baroreceptors and juxtaglomerular cells. Changes in the homeostasis of the human body, such as osmolality are detected by the system, which causes a chain reaction that ends with the adrenal gland either increasing or suppressing the production of aldosterone.

=== Hyperadrenalism ===
Hyperadrenalism refers to the overactivity of the adrenal glands. This is usually indicated by the excessive production of the hormones produced by the adrenal glands. As the hormones produced are regulated by a range of systems in the body, overactivity of the adrenal glands can be caused by different systemic dysfunctions, leading to the overproduction of specific hormones.

==== Overproduction of Cortisol/ Hypercortisolism (HCM) ====
A detailed list of symptoms related to Cushing's Syndrome, which is caused by hypercortisolism.

When the body is exposed to an excess level of cortisol, generalized symptoms that are referred to as Cushing's syndrome appear. However, the condition may only be temporary, known as pseudo-Cushing's syndrome (PCS). Therefore, it is important to understand the cause of the syndrome to differentiate between PCS and HCM. HCM itself also has many causes, such as adrenal adenomas and carcinomas causing the adrenal gland to be unresponsive to the negative feedback loop. An increase in ACTH production could be due to a pituitary adenoma, or ectopic ACTH production, where tumors growing outside the hypothalamic-pituitary-adrenal axis also secrete ACTH.

==== Overproduction of aldosterone/ Hyperaldosteronism ====
The difference between primary hyperaldosteronism and secondary hyperaldosteronism lies in the causation of excess aldosterone, where primary hyperaldosteronism refers to the overproduction of aldosterone from the adrenal glands, and secondary hyperaldosteronism refers to the overactivation of the RAAS system. Primary hyperaldosteronism presents as a tumor in the gland, known as Conn Syndrome. Secondary hyperaldosteronism may occur from a renin-producing tumor, or other edematous disorders that affect the baroreceptors and juxtaglomerular cells.

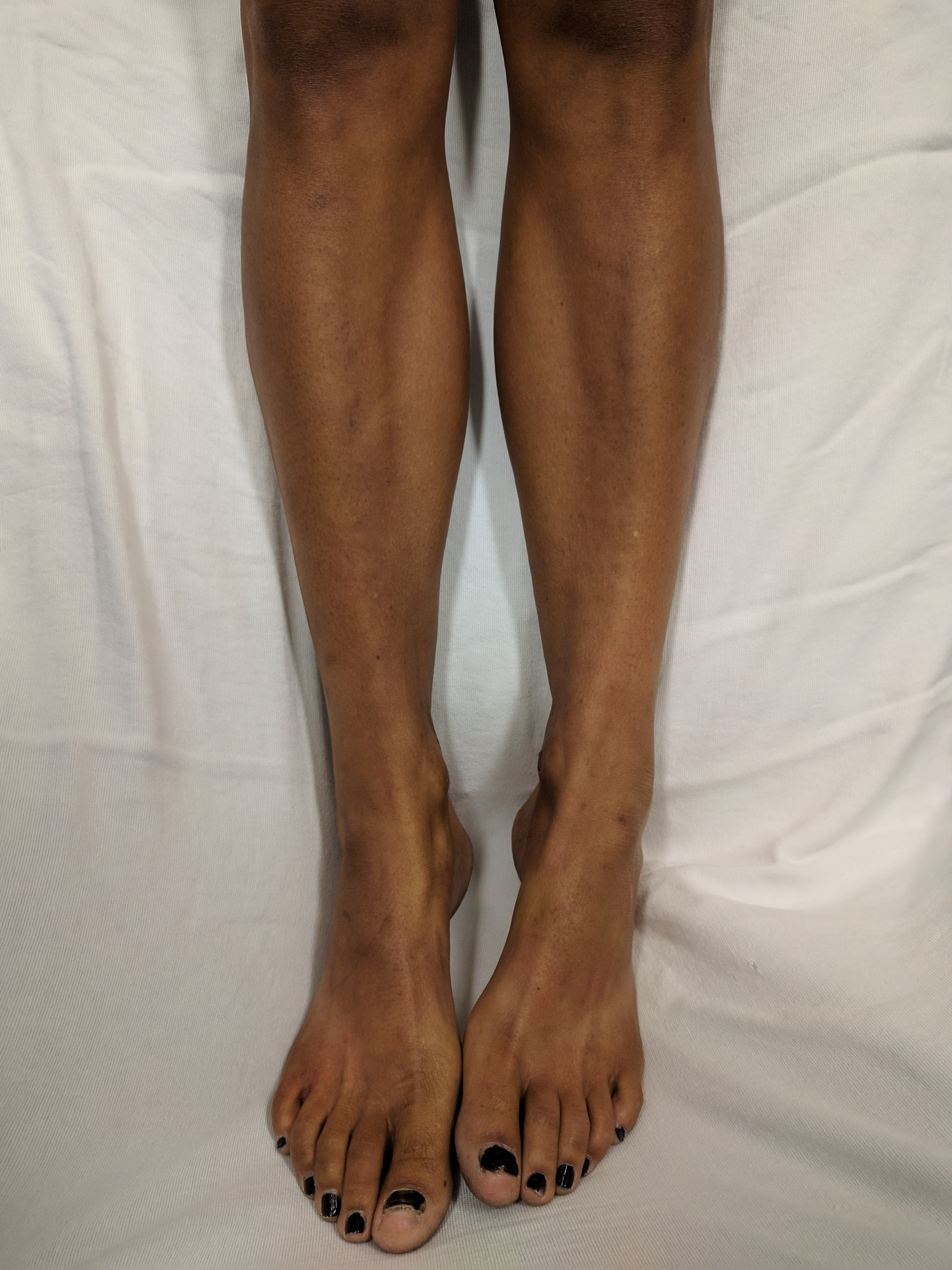
Legs of a Caucasian Woman with Addison's Disease. Hypocortisolism causes a chain reaction that leads to hyperpigmentation.

=== Hypoadrenalism ===
Hypoadrenalism, or adrenal insufficiency, is a condition indicated by the underproduction of hormones that are related to the adrenal glands. Underactivity of the adrenal gland is also caused by the adrenal glands, or by other systemic dysfunctions, leading to insufficient production of hormones. This can be further classified into Primary Adrenal Insufficiency, where the damaged adrenal glands cannot produce hormones, or Secondary Adrenal Insufficiency, where the pituitary gland does not produce enough ACTH to stimulate the adrenal gland to produce hormones. The type of adrenal insufficiency will affect which hormones can or cannot be produced.

==== Underproduction of cortisol/ Hypocortisolism ====
Hypocortisolism can be caused by autoimmune disorders, cancer, fungal infections, tuberculosis infection of the adrenal glands and inherited disorders of the endocrine gland. In primary adrenal insufficiency, the damaged glands are unable to produce cortisol. The lack of cortisol will not initiate the negative feedback loop, which will cause the pituitary gland to continue producing ACTH and CRH, leading to symptoms that are related to Addison's disease. In secondary adrenal insufficiency, the pituitary gland does not produce enough ACTH to stimulate the production of cortisol. Hypocortisolism will lead to hypoglycemia and hypotension.

==== Underproduction of aldosterone/ Hypoaldosteronism ====
Hypoaldosteronism occurs in primary adrenal insufficiency, but not secondary adrenal insufficiency. This is because secondary adrenal insufficiency is related to the pituitary gland and its ability to produce ACTH, which is not a hormone that regulates the production of Aldosterone from the adrenal gland. However, primary adrenal insufficiency is caused by damage to the adrenal glands, which leads to underproduction of the hormones. Primary adrenal insufficiency causes hypoaldosteronism along with hypocortisolism.

== Symptoms ==
Hyperaldrenalism, also known as Cushing's Syndrome, often causes remarkable symptoms in patients, including obesity in the upper body, thin limbs, weak skeleton, and hypertension. Besides the changes in physical health, patients' mental health will also be affected. They are generally more prone to anxiety and fatigue. On the other hand, hypoadrenalism, often referred to as Addison's disease, will cause stronger fatigue in patients with a reduction in body weight and appetite. Hypotension, hypoglycemia, and nausea will also be observed.

== Treatments ==
Treatment of adrenalism varies from surgery to radiotherapy, and medications. The choices of therapy depend on the cause of adrenalism and are listed in descending order of invasiveness of the treatment to the patient. The general idea of the treatment is to replenish the lowered cortisol level by direct supplement or increasing the production level of cortisol in the human body in case of hypoadrenalism, and to reduce the cortisol level by killing or suppressing the adrenal gland in case of hyperadrenalism.

=== Surgery ===
Medical practitioners usually recommend surgical treatment for adrenalism caused by tumors since it is one of the most direct ways to cure the disease permanently. With a solid tumor overstimulating or suppressing the normal function of the adrenal glands, surgeons can locate the tumor and remove it using the traditional surgical method. If the tumor is found at the pituitary gland, neurosurgeons would perform the surgery either by craniotomy where the skull is opened and the whole pituitary gland is exposed for tumor cleaning, or by microsurgery where all surgical tools are placed into the brain through the nasal cavity. Microscopes are used to locate the tumor which is then removed with precision. The positive aspect of undergoing adrenal surgery is that it is still currently the fastest solution to adrenalism that can permanently cure the disease. The disadvantage side of removing the adrenal gland is that patients would need to undergo cortisol replacement medication for months, if not life-long, to restore the body's normal hormone level, as well as the risk of invasive surgery itself.

=== Radiotherapy ===
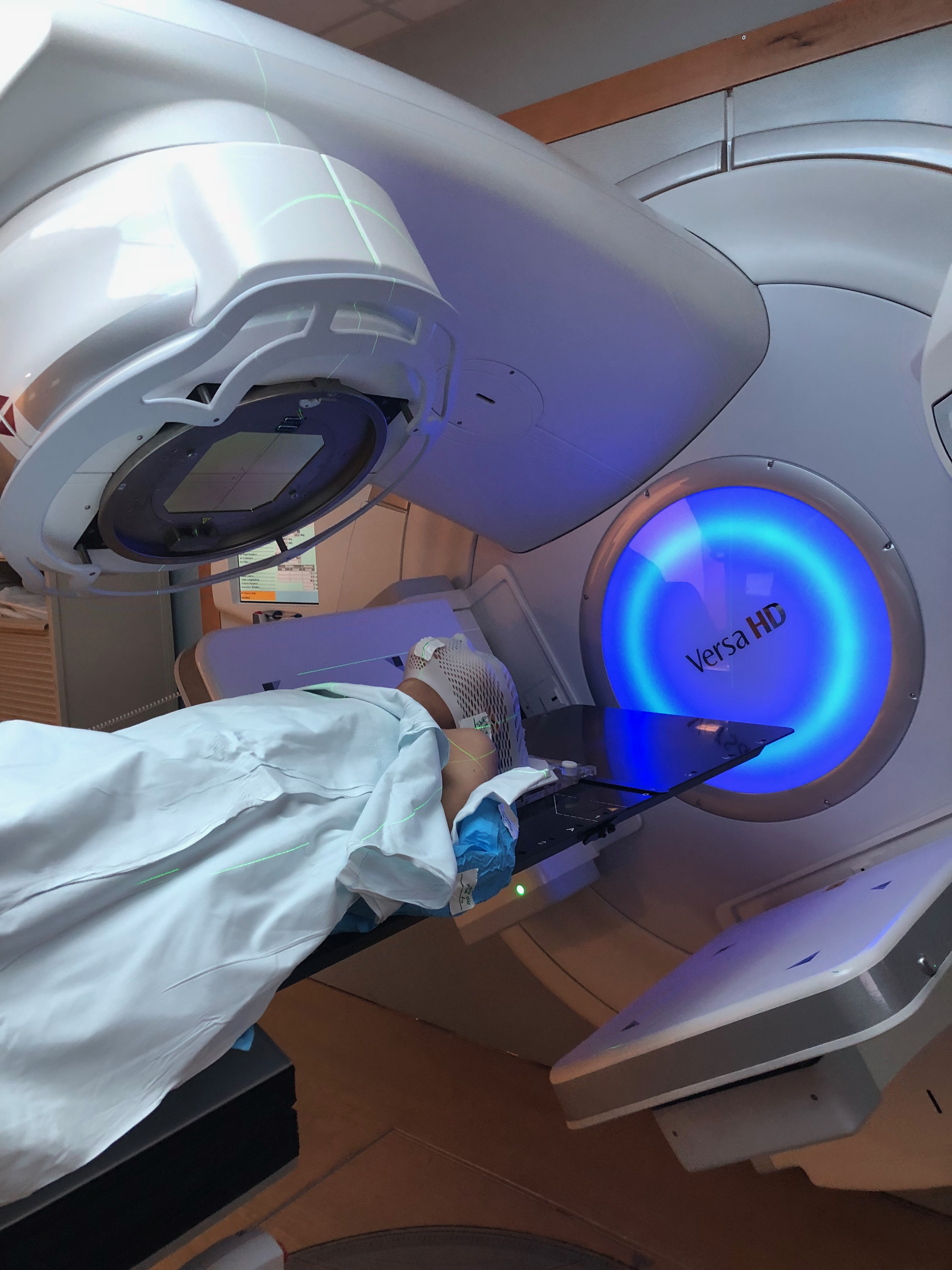
Radiotherapy can be an option to treat adrenalism, as it is effective in killing cancer cells across a large surface area.

Radiotherapy is also a prompt option for treating adrenalism. It is employed when standard surgery does not work against tumors, or if the patient is not suitable for surgery. Such therapy is useful in treating early-stage adrenalism caused by cancer. It can effectively penetrate small cancer cells across a large area. As a result, it is still effective in situations where cancers have spread out. Normal adrenal levels are usually restored within weeks. There are 2 common ways to treat adrenalism with radiation, namely conventional external beam or stereotactic radiosurgery. The former administers a high dose of radiation around the gland aiming to destroy or reduce the size of the tumor or kill the cell directly by inhibiting cellular proliferation of the cells through exposure to radiation quickly. On the other hand, stereotactic radiosurgery utilizes a series of gamma radiation precisely on the adrenal gland to induce cell death, greatly lowering the side effect of the therapy on surrounding organs such as damaging neighboring cells with normal functions and leading to hormonal dysregulation. However, in post-surgical follow-ups, neurological impact and a high risk of cell mutations are recorded since ionizing radiation is employed in stereotactic radiotherapy.

=== Medications ===
Physicians usually recommend medications to patients whose adrenalism is not caused by cancer, since chemotherapy has been proven to be ineffective. Common use of medications include drugs that suppress cortisol production in the adrenal gland by inhibiting 11-beta hydroxylase. Ketoconazole and metyrapone fall under this drug category. Besides mediating the function of adrenal glands, medications may also be given to destroy the gland internally for hyperadrenalism to lower hormone levels. Mitotane is administered to promote apoptosis at the adrenal gland with the downregulation of P450 enzymes and accumulation of free cholesterol which direct cell oxidation rapidly, causing permanent cell death in the glands. Moreover, doctors may prescribe hydrocortisone or prednisolone to patients as a hormone replacement therapy to replenish the depleted adrenal level in patients with Addison's disease. The benefits of medications are that it is non-invasive and the risk of treatment is greatly lowered. On the other hand, the downsides of medications are their low therapeutic effectiveness and a relatively longer time required to illustrate the therapeutic effect. Moreover, past experiences observe side effects of the medication including vomiting, muscle pain, hypertension, and hypokalemia.
