= SMARCD1 =

Protein-coding gene in the species Homo sapiens

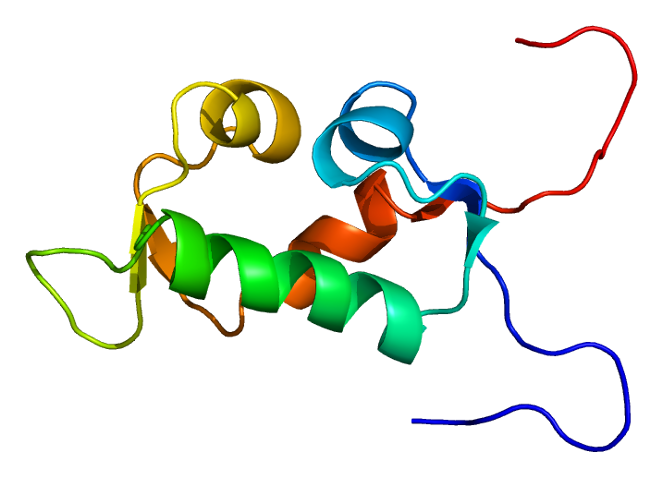

Identifiers
- Aliases: SMARCD1, BAF60A, CRACD1, Rsc6p, SWI/SNF related, matrix associated, actin dependent regulator of chromatin, subfamily d, member 1, CSS11
- External IDs: OMIM: 601735; MGI: 1933623; GeneCards: SMARCD1
Available structures
PDB	Ortholog search: PDBe RCSB
PDB	List of PDB id codes 1UHR

Gene location (Human)
Chr.	Chromosome 12 (human)
Band	12q13.12	Start	50,085,200 bp
Band	12q13.12	End	50,100,707 bp

Gene location (Mouse)
Chr.	Chromosome 15 (mouse)
Band	15 F1|15 56.13 cM	Start	99,600,010 bp
Band	15 F1|15 56.13 cM	End	99,611,872 bp
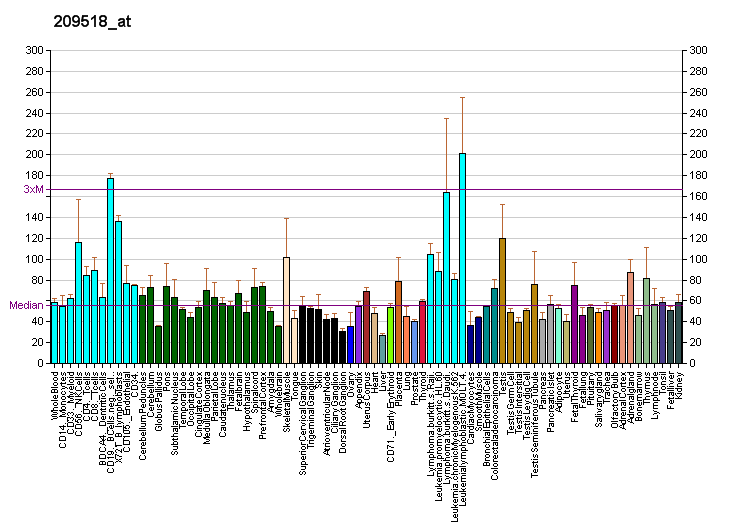

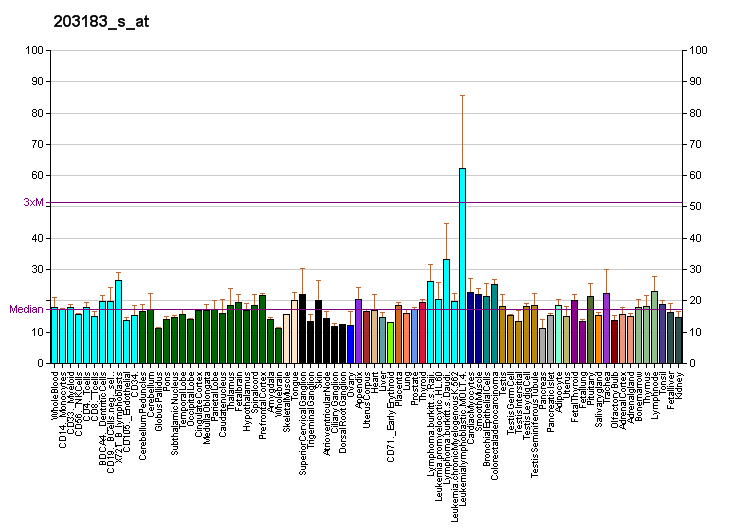
RNA expression pattern
Bgee	Human / Mouse (ortholog); Top expressed in: ganglionic eminence; ventricular zone; right lobe of thyroid gland; left lobe of thyroid gland; right ovary; cardia; right hemisphere of cerebellum; body of uterus; left ovary; granulocyte / Top expressed in: superior frontal gyrus; ventricular zone; epiblast; primary visual cortex; tail of embryo; neural tube; dentate gyrus of hippocampal formation granule cell; genital tubercle; olfactory tubercle; entorhinal cortex; More reference expression data
BioGPS	More reference expression data
Gene ontology
Molecular function	molecular adaptor activity; transcription coactivator activity; chromatin binding; protein binding; signaling receptor binding
Cellular component	npBAF complex; nBAF complex; nucleus; nucleoplasm; intracellular membrane-bounded organelle; SWI/SNF complex
Biological process	regulation of transcription by RNA polymerase II; chromatin remodeling; nucleosome disassembly; cellular response to fatty acid; nervous system development; chromatin organization
Sources:Amigo / QuickGO
Orthologs
Databases	NCBI: entry; OMA: entry
Species	Human	Mouse
Entrez	6602	83797
Ensembl	ENSG00000066117	ENSMUSG00000023018
UniProt	Q96GM5	Q61466
RefSeq (mRNA)	NM_003076; NM_139071	NM_031842
RefSeq (protein)	NP_003067; NP_620710	NP_114030
Location (UCSC)	Chr 12: 50.09 – 50.1 Mb	Chr 15: 99.6 – 99.61 Mb
PubMed search
- Wikidata
View/Edit Human	View/Edit Mouse

SWI/SNF-related matrix-associated actin-dependent regulator of chromatin subfamily D member 1 is a protein that in humans is encoded by the SMARCD1 gene.

The protein encoded by this gene is a member of the SWI/SNF family of proteins, whose members display helicase and ATPase activities and which are thought to regulate transcription of certain genes by altering the chromatin structure around those genes. The encoded protein is part of the large ATP-dependent chromatin remodeling complex SNF/SWI and has sequence similarity to the yeast Swp73 protein. Two transcript variants encoding different isoforms have been found for this gene.

== Interactions ==
SMARCD1 has been shown to interact with Glucocorticoid receptor.
