= Nivacortol =

Chemical compound

Clinical data
- Other names: Nivazol; Nivazole; WIN-27914; Novozola; NEBO-174; 2'-(4-Fluorophenyl)-2'-H-pregna-2,4-dien-20-yno(3,2-c)pyrazol-17-ol
- Drug class: Corticosteroid; Glucocorticoid

Identifiers
- IUPAC name: (1R,3aS,3bR,10aR,10bS,12aS)-1-Ethynyl-7-(4-fluorophenyl)-10a,12a-dimethyl-1,2,3,3a,3b,4,5,7,10,10a,10b,11,12,12a-tetradecahydrocyclopenta[5,6]naphtho[1,2-f]indazol-1-ol
- CAS Number: 24358-76-7
- PubChem CID: 9910575
- ChemSpider: 8086226
- UNII: 50U0Z120RS
- KEGG: D05194
- ChEMBL: ChEMBL2106806
- CompTox Dashboard (EPA): DTXSID301043242
- ECHA InfoCard: 100.041.987

Chemical and physical data
- Formula: C_{28}H_{31}FN_{2}O
- Molar mass: 430.567 g·mol^{−1}
- 3D model (JSmol): Interactive image
- SMILES: C[C@]12CC[C@H]3[C@H]([C@@H]1CC[C@]2(C#C)O)CCC4=CC5=C(C[C@]34C)C=NN5C6=CC=C(C=C6)F
- InChI: InChI=InChI=1S/C28H31FN2O/c1-4-28(32)14-12-24-22-10-5-19-15-25-18(16-26(19,2)23(22)11-13-27(24,28)3)17-30-31(25)21-8-6-20(29)7-9-21/h1,6-9,15,17,22-24,32H,5,10-14,16H2,2-3H3/t22-,23+,24+,26+,27+,28+/m1/s1; Key:ZQLOAGFNRKBEAJ-BDPSOKNUSA-N

Nivacortol (developmental code names WIN-27914 and NEBO-174; also known as nivazol and nivazole) is a synthetic glucocorticoid corticosteroid which was never marketed.
