= Steroid dementia syndrome =

- Specialty: Neurology/psychiatry

Steroid dementia syndrome describes the signs and symptoms of hippocampal and prefrontal cortical dysfunction, such as deficits in memory (both short term and long term), attention, and executive function, induced by corticoids. Dementia-like symptoms have been found in some individuals who have been exposed to glucocorticoid medication, often dispensed in the form of asthma, arthritis, and anti-inflammatory steroid.

The term "steroid dementia" was coined by Varney et al. (1984) in reference to the effects of long-term glucocorticoid use in 1,500 patients. While the condition generally falls under the classification of Cushing's syndrome, the term "steroid dementia syndrome" is particularly useful because it recognizes both the cause of the syndrome and the specific effects of glucocorticoids on cognitive function. Further, the more precise terminology clearly distinguishes the condition from full-blown Cushing's syndrome, which is extremely broad regarding the causes (endogenous or exogenous, pituitary or adrenal) and the multitude of symptoms (ranging from skin disorders to osteoporosis), and from hypercortisolemia, which identifies neither the source nor the symptoms of excess circulatory cortisol.

== Signs and symptoms ==
Cognitive symptoms from steroids appear within the first few weeks of treatment, appear to be dose dependent, and may or may not be accompanied by steroid psychosis or other Cushing's-type symptoms.

The symptoms include deficits in

- verbal and non-verbal memory
- working memory
- attention
- sustained concentration
- executive function
- psychomotor speed
- academic or occupational performance.

These symptoms have been shown to improve within months to a year after discontinuing glucocorticoid medication, but residual impairments following prolonged steroid use can remain.

== Pathophysiology ==
Regions of the brain with a high density of glucocorticoid receptors (GRs) including the hippocampus, hypothalamus, and prefrontal cortex are particularly sensitive to elevated circulating levels of glucocorticoids even in the absence of stress. Scientific studies have mainly focused on the impact of glucocorticoids on the hippocampus because of its role in memory processes and on the prefrontal cortex for its role in attention and executive function.

Elevated glucocorticoid activity is associated with down-regulation of GRs (known as "glucocorticoid cascade hypothesis"), which diminishes neuroreparative activity and attenuates neurogenesis that can result in decreased hippocampal volume with prolonged glucocorticoid exposure.

Variations in individual sensitivity to glucocorticoid medications may be due to either GR hypofunction or hyperfunction. Similarly, variations in individual hypothalamic-pituitary-adrenal (HPA) axis responsiveness can modulate the type and number of side effects.

Steroid Dementia Syndrome is caused by prolonged exposure to glucocorticoid levels which directly affect structures and functions of the brain which are involved in cognition and emotion regulation. Research has shown that exposure from chronic glucocorticoid affects the areas of the hippocampus, prefrontal cortex, and amygdala. These three areas that are shown to be affected contain high concentrations of the receptors for glucocorticoid. The most vulnerable hippocampus, this exposure becomes vulnerable as it plays a role in memory and learning. Studies have also shown that with excess cortisol exposure, hippocampal glucose metabolism is slowed while also decreasing hippocampal activity. This is linked with impairments with learning and retention in memory. With long term glucocorticoid exposure, there have been associations with volume in the hippocampus, along with neuronal atrophy. These elevated levels of cortisol suppress brain derived neurotrophic factors while also contributing to neuronal damage through increased glutamate activity. In the prefrontal cortex, the effects that this causes are impairment in executive function and attention. Meanwhile changes in the amygdala are associated with anxiety, emotional dysregulation, and disturbances in mood. These alterations in neurobiology explain how cognitive changes and psychiatric symptoms come with Steroid Dementia Syndrome.

== Treatment ==
Aside from discontinuation of glucocorticoid medication, potential treatments discussed in the research literature include:

- anti-glucocorticoids
- psychoactive drugs that up-regulate the GRII glucocorticoid receptor:
  - tricyclic antidepressants: desipramine, imipramine, and amitriptyline (SSRIs do not)
  - serotonin antagonists: ketanserin
  - mood stabilizers: lithium
- corticotropin-releasing hormone (CRH) antagonists
- glutamate antagonists
- dehydroepiandrosterone (DHEA)
- small molecule brain-derived neurotrophic factor (BDNF) analogs
- stress reduction therapies and exercise.

== History ==
Glucocorticoid medications have been known to be associated with significant side effects involving behavior and mood, regardless of previous psychiatric or cognitive condition, since the early 1950s. But cognitive side effects of steroid medications involving memory and attention are not as widely publicized and may be misdiagnosed as separate conditions, such as attention deficit disorder (ADHD or ADD) in children or early Alzheimer's disease in elderly patients.

=== Case Studies ===
Wolkowitz et al. (2001) presented a 10-year-old male patient, with no prior psychiatric history, who showed significant declines in academic performance that began during a 5-week course of glucocorticoid treatment for acute asthma flare. The medications included prednisone, and methylprednisolone, plus albuterol, beclomethasone, dexamethasone, cromolyn, salmeterol and clarithromycin. Within days of beginning the glucocorticoid treatment, however, the patient began to show symptoms that included major depression, irritability, muscle weakness, and hallucinations ("stars" or "spots"). The patient had a fraternal twin brother, and the two previously performed in parallel academically, but following the steroid treatment the patient exhibited poor memory, attention, concentration, insomnia, and avoidance of eye contact. As a result, he began to fall behind his twin brother in academic, developmental, and social areas. The treatment with steroids was stopped and three years later (while still taking buspirone, albuterol, fluticasone and salmeterol inhalers, loratadine and theophylline) the boy showed gradual improvement, but MRI brain scans revealed that the patient's hippocampal volume was 19.5% smaller than that of his twin. His teachers reported continued deficits in memory function, new learning efficiency, verbal reasoning skills, organizational skills, attention, and concentration, deficits which were confirmed by neuropsychological testing; as such, stopping the treatment with steroids brought on a substantial but incomplete relief, the damage being possibly permanent.

Sacks et al. (2005) reported the case of a 72-year-old man, described as professionally successful, intelligent, and cultivated, with polymyalgia rheumatica, who after being treated with prednisone developed a psychosis and dementia, which several behavioral neurology and neuropsychiatry consultants initially diagnosed as early dementia or Alzheimer's disease. Large dosage variations in the patient's medication (including a self-increased dosage from 10 mg/day to as much as 100 mg/day for at least 3 months) produced extreme behavioral changes, from missed appointments to physical altercations, and eventually admission to a psychiatric ward and later to a locked Alzheimer facility. During this time, neuropsychological testing showed a decline in the patient's previously superior IQ as well as deficits in memory, language, fluency, and visuospatial function, which given the patient's age was considered to be compatible with early dementia. When the steroid treatment ended after a year, the patent's confusion and disorganized appearance stopped immediately. Within several weeks, testing showed strong improvement in almost all cognitive functions. His doctors were surprised at the improvement, since the results were inconsistent with a diagnosis of dementia or Alzheimer's. Testing after 14 months showed a large jump in Full Scale IQ from 87 to 124, but mild dysfunction in executive function, memory, attentional control, and verbal/nonverbal memory remained.
