= Dagrocorat =

Chemical compound

Clinical data
- Other names: PF-00251802; PF-251802
- Drug class: Selective glucocorticoid receptor modulator

Identifiers
- IUPAC name: (4bS,7R,8aR)-4b-Benzyl-7-hydroxy-N-(2-methylpyridin-3-yl)-7-(trifluoromethyl)-5,6,8,8a,9,10-hexahydrophenanthrene-2-carboxamide
- CAS Number: 1044535-52-5
- PubChem CID: 24873449
- ChemSpider: 32700623
- UNII: OPM23UN90U
- KEGG: D10617
- ChEMBL: ChEMBL3137304
- CompTox Dashboard (EPA): DTXSID60146493

Chemical and physical data
- Formula: C_{29}H_{29}F_{3}N_{2}O_{2}
- Molar mass: 494.558 g·mol^{−1}
- 3D model (JSmol): Interactive image
- SMILES: CC1=C(C=CC=N1)NC(=O)C2=CC3=C(C=C2)[C@@]4(CC[C@@](C[C@H]4CC3)(C(F)(F)F)O)CC5=CC=CC=C5
- InChI: InChI=1S/C29H29F3N2O2/c1-19-25(8-5-15-33-19)34-26(35)22-10-12-24-21(16-22)9-11-23-18-28(36,29(30,31)32)14-13-27(23,24)17-20-6-3-2-4-7-20/h2-8,10,12,15-16,23,36H,9,11,13-14,17-18H2,1H3,(H,34,35)/t23-,27+,28-/m1/s1; Key:QJJBNCHSWFGXML-KEKPKEOLSA-N

Dagrocorat (developmental code names PF-00251802, PF-251802) is a nonsteroidal but steroid-like selective glucocorticoid receptor modulator (SGRM) which was under development for the treatment of rheumatoid arthritis but was never marketed. It is described as a partial agonist and "dissociable" agonist of the glucocorticoid receptor. The drug reached phase I clinical trials prior to the discontinuation of its development. The C2α dihydrogen phosphate ester of dagrocorat, fosdagrocorat, was also under investigation, but its development was terminated as well.

== See also ==
- AZD-5423
- CORT-108297
- Mapracorat
- Fosdagrocorat
