= Transrepression =

Molecular biological process

In the field of molecular biology, transrepression is a process whereby one protein represses (i.e., inhibits) the activity of a second protein through a protein-protein interaction. Since this repression occurs between two different protein molecules (intermolecular), it is referred to as a trans-acting process.

The protein that is repressed is usually a transcription factor whose function is to up-regulate (i.e., increase) the rate of gene transcription. Hence the net result of transrepression is down regulation of gene transcription.

An example of transrepression is the ability of the glucocorticoid receptor to inhibit the transcriptional promoting activity of the AP-1 and NF-κB transcription factors. In addition to transactivation, transrepression is an important pathway for the anti-inflammatory effects of glucocorticoids. Other nuclear receptors such as LXR and PPAR have been demonstrated to also have the ability to transrepress the activity of other proteins.

== See also ==
- Selective glucocorticoid receptor agonist
