= AZD-5423 =

Chemical compound

Identifiers
- IUPAC name: 2,2,2-Trifluoro-N-[(1R,2S)-1-{[1-(4-fluorophenyl)-1H-indazol-5-yl]oxy}-1-(3-methoxyphenyl)-2-propanyl]acetamide
- CAS Number: 1034148-04-3
- PubChem CID: 24825740
- ChemSpider: 28536140
- UNII: 641H0Q518W
- CompTox Dashboard (EPA): DTXSID40145823
- ECHA InfoCard: 100.205.965

Chemical and physical data
- Formula: C_{25}H_{21}F_{4}N_{3}O_{3}
- Molar mass: 487.455 g·mol^{−1}
- 3D model (JSmol): Interactive image
- SMILES: C[C@@H]([C@@H](c1cccc(c1)OC)Oc2ccc3c(c2)cnn3c4ccc(cc4)F)NC(=O)C(F)(F)F
- InChI: InChI=1S/C25H21F4N3O3/c1-15(31-24(33)25(27,28)29)23(16-4-3-5-20(12-16)34-2)35-21-10-11-22-17(13-21)14-30-32(22)19-8-6-18(26)7-9-19/h3-15,23H,1-2H3,(H,31,33)/t15-,23-/m0/s1; Key:FCNQMDSJHADDFT-WNSKOXEYSA-N

AZD-5423 is a nonsteroidal glucocorticoid and phase II experimental drug being developed by AstraZeneca and disclosed at the spring 2013 American Chemical Society meeting in New Orleans to treat respiratory diseases and in particular chronic obstructive pulmonary disease.

It has completed a phase II clinical trial.

== See also ==
- Dagrocorat
- Fosdagrocorat
- Mapracorat
