= Tegacorat =

Investigational drug

Clinical data
- Other names: GRM-01; GRT-6019

Identifiers
- IUPAC name: 6,7-difluoro-8-(6-fluoro-1-methylsulfonylindol-4-yl)-1,4,4,9-tetramethyl-5H-[1,2,4]triazolo[4,3-a]quinoxaline
- CAS Number: 2409551-99-9
- PubChem CID: 153315807
- ChemSpider: 133321735
- UNII: X4A75C2AX8

Chemical and physical data
- Formula: C_{22}H_{20}F_{3}N_{5}O_{2}S
- Molar mass: 475.49 g·mol^{−1}
- 3D model (JSmol): Interactive image
- SMILES: CC1=C(C(=C(C2=C1N3C(=NN=C3C(N2)(C)C)C)F)F)C4=C5C=CN(C5=CC(=C4)F)S(=O)(=O)C
- InChI: InChI=InChI=1S/C22H20F3N5O2S/c1-10-16(14-8-12(23)9-15-13(14)6-7-29(15)33(5,31)32)17(24)18(25)19-20(10)30-11(2)27-28-21(30)22(3,4)26-19/h6-9,26H,1-5H3; Key:NHPKTDVPWCXNGJ-UHFFFAOYSA-N

Tegacorat is an investigational new drug that is being evaluated by Grunenthal GmbH for the treatment of Duchenne muscular dystrophy. It is a non-steroidal selective glucocorticoid receptor modulator.
