= Selective glucocorticoid receptor modulator =

Class of experimental drugs

- Drug class
- Chemical structure of mapracorat, one of the furthest developed SEGRAs.

Class identifiers
- Synonyms: SEGRM; SEGRA; SEGRAM; DIGRA
- Use: Potentially atopic dermatitis, glaucoma, cataract, eye infections, and others
- Biological target: Glucocorticoid receptor
- Chemical class: Steroidal; nonsteroidal

Legal status

Selective glucocorticoid receptor modulators (SEGRMs) and selective glucocorticoid receptor agonists (SEGRAs) formerly known as dissociated glucocorticoid receptor agonists (DIGRAs) are a class of experimental drugs designed to share many of the desirable anti-inflammatory, immunosuppressive, or anticancer properties of classical glucocorticoid drugs but with fewer side effects such as skin atrophy. Although preclinical evidence on SEGRAMs’ anti-inflammatory effects are culminating, currently, the efficacy of these SEGRAMs on cancer are largely unknown.

Selective glucocorticoid receptor agonists (SEGRAs) are historically and typically steroidal in structure while selective glucocorticoid receptor modulators (SEGRMs) are typically nonsteroidal. The combined abbreviation of selective glucocorticoid receptor agonist and modulator is SEGRAM. A number of such ligands have been developed and are being evaluated in preclinical and clinical testing.

SEGRAMs achieve their selectivity by triggering only a subset the glucocorticoid receptor mechanisms of action.

== History ==
Synthetic steroids with SEGRA-like properties were already discovered in the late 1990s. During the 2000s, many potential SEGRAMs were synthesized, most of them having nonsteroidal structures. In in vitro studies in cellular models these SEGRAM molecules bind to the glucocorticoid receptor with an affinity similar to dexamethasone, a potent glucocorticoid, and with an ability to repress the production of inflammatory mediators such as interleukin 6 and prostaglandin E2. Moreover, in vitro a particular SEGRAM can promote apoptosis in prostate cancer and leukemia.

In vivo studies in mice and rats showed that a topically administered SEGRAM inhibited peroxidase activity and formation of oedema, both indicators of anti-inflammatory activity, comparably to prednisolone. Systemic administration in mice or rats indicate that SEGRAMs can diminish acute infections, rheumatoid arthritis, asthma and colitis. In vivo evidence on whether particular SEGRAMs can elicit similar effects than classic glucocorticoid in cancer pathologies is currently lacking. Current preclinical tests show that the SEGRAMs available so far would elicit fewer side effect or at least less grave side effects than classic glucocorticoids would. For example, skin atrophy in rats was significantly less pronounced than under prednisolone in a study using the SEGRAM Mapracorat, and metabolic effects like weight gain or increase of blood glucose were practically inexistent.

== Mechanism of action ==
The benzopyranoquinoline A 276575, an example of a SEGRA with a more corticosteroid-like structure

Both non-selective glucocorticoids and selective glucocorticoid receptor agonists work by binding to and activating the glucocorticoid receptor (GR). In contrast to glucocorticoids, which activate the GR to work through (at least) two signal transduction pathways, SEGRAMs activate the GR in such a way that it only operates through one of the two main possible pathways.

In the absence of glucocorticoids, the GR resides in the cytosol in an inactive state complexed with heat shock proteins (HSPs) and immunophilins. Binding of glucocorticoids to the GR activates the receptor by causing a conformational change in the GR and thus a dissociation of the bound HSPs. The activated GR can then regulate gene expression via one of two pathways:

Transactivation
The first (direct) pathway is called transactivation whereby the activated GR dimerizes, is translocated into the nucleus and binds to specific sequences of DNA called glucocorticoid response elements (GREs). The GR/DNA complex recruits other proteins which transcribe downstream DNA into mRNA and eventually protein. Examples of glucocorticoid-responsive genes include those that encode annexin A1, TSC22D3 (also known as GILZ), angiotensin-converting enzyme, neutral endopeptidase and other anti-inflammatory proteins.
Transrepression
The second (indirect) pathway is called transrepression, in which activated monomeric GR binds to other transcription factors such as NF-κB and AP-1 and prevents these from up-regulating the expression of their target genes. These target genes encode proteins such as cyclooxygenase, NO synthase, phospholipase A2, tumor necrosis factor, transforming growth factor beta, ICAM-1, and a number of other pro-inflammatory proteins.

Simplified overview of the mechanism of action of a classical glucocorticoid vs the mechanism of action of a SEGRAM

Hence the anti-inflammatory effects of glucocorticoids results from both transactivation and transrepression. In contrast, studies in rats and mice have shown that most of the side effects of glucocorticoids, such as diabetogenic activity, osteoporosis, as well as skin atrophy, are mainly caused by transactivation. A selective glucocorticoid that is able to transrepress without transactivation should preserve many of the desirable therapeutic anti-inflammatory effects and minimize these particular undesired side effects.

Initial evidence that transpression alone can be sufficient for an anti-inflammatory response was provided by introducing a point mutation in the GR of mice that prevented GR from dimerizing and binding to DNA and thereby blocking transactivation. At the same time, this mutation did not interfere with transrepression. While GR is essential for survival, these mice are still viable. However, when these mice were treated with the synthetic glucocorticoid dexamethasone, there was no elevation of glucose. These dexamethasone-treated mice were resistant to an inflammatory stimulus. Hence, these mice were responsive to the anti-inflammatory effects of dexamethasone but were resistant to at least some of the side effects.

Just like glucocorticoids, SEGRAMs bind to and activate GR. However, in contrast to glucocorticoids, SEGRAMs selectively activate the GR in such a way that they yield an improved therapeutic benefit. Generally, for specific inflammation-based diseases, SEGRAMs should more strongly transrepress than transactivate, or better yet solely transrepress and fail to transactivate. This type of selective GR activation should result in fewer side effects than the expected side effects that appear with a chronic treatment with classic glucocorticoids.

== Clinical trials ==
Phase II clinical trials with one of the candidate compounds, mapracorat (code names BOL-303242-X and ZK 245186), started in summer 2009. One was a double blind dose finding study for an ointment against atopic dermatitis conducted by Intendis, a part of Bayer HealthCare Pharmaceuticals specialized on dermatology. A Phase III trial started in November 2010, evaluating an ophthalmic suspension for the treatment of inflammation following cataract surgery, conducted by Bausch & Lomb.

A phase II trial with another dissociated glucocorticoid fosdagrocorat (PF-04171327) (a phosphate ester prodrug of dagrocorat (PF-00251802)) for rheumatoid arthritis was started in 2011 by Pfizer.

The results of these clinical trials have not yet been disclosed and no SEGRAM has as yet been approved for clinical use.

== Potential applications ==
In chronic inflammatory diseases like atopic dermatitis (skin), rheumatoid arthritis (joints),..., the side effects of corticosteroids are problematic because of the necessary long-term treatment. Therefore, SEGRAMs are being investigated as an alternative topical treatment. Systemic long-term treatment of inflammations with corticosteroids is particularly liable to cause metabolic side-effects, which makes the development of oral SEGRAMs an interesting goal. It remains to be seen whether selective receptor agonists or modulators indeed cause significantly less side-effects than classical corticoids in clinical applications.

== Beneficial atrophic effects ==
Of note, the atrophic effects of glucocorticoids are not always a disadvantage. The treatment of hyperproliferative diseases like psoriasis makes use of this property. SEGRAMs would likely be less effective in such conditions. Recent advances have shown that the former striving towards a total separation of GR transrepression and transactivation by using SEGRAMs deserves to be nuanced as the anti-inflammatory genes stimulated by GR transactivation, such as GILZ and DUSP1, do seem to play an important role. Nevertheless, the more selective nature of these SEGRAMs would still reduce the number of GR-mediated side effects, and deserves further clinical testing.

== Chemistry ==
RU 24858, a SEGRA with steroid structure

An octahydrophenanthrene-2,7-diol derivative with SEGRA properties

Early SEGRAs were synthetic steroids. An example is RU 24858, one of the first compounds of this type to be published. Many newer SEGRAs have a different framework, although the similarity to steroids can still be seen in molecules like the benzopyranoquinoline A 276575 or in octahydrophenanthrene-2,7-diol derivatives. All of these compounds have been shown to exhibit SEGRA properties in cellular or in animal models.

Mapracorat is one of a number of trifluoropropanolamines and -amides which are less obviously steroid-like in structure. Other typical examples of this group are ZK 216348 and 55D1E1. The bulky, bicyclic aromatic substituents (R^{1} and R^{2}) account for the structural similarity to corticoids. The R conformation of the asymmetric carbon atom seems to be essential for GR affinity.

== List of SEGRMs ==
- CORT-108297 [1018679-79-2]
- Dagrocorat (PF-00251802, PF-251802)
- Dazucorilant (Cort113176)
- Fosdagrocorat (PF-04171327, PF-4171327)
- Mapracorat (BOL-303242-X, ZK-245186)
- Relacorilant (CORT125134)
- Tegacorat (GRM-01)

== See also ==
- Selective receptor modulator
- Selective androgen receptor modulator
- Selective estrogen receptor modulator
- Selective progesterone receptor modulator
