= Fosdagrocorat =

Chemical compound

Clinical data
- Other names: PF-04171327; PF-4171327; Dagrocorat 2-(dihydrogen phosphate); Dagrocorat dihydrogen phosphate
- Drug class: Selective glucocorticoid receptor modulator

Identifiers
- IUPAC name: [(2R,4aS,10aR)-4a-Benzyl-7-[(2-methylpyridin-3-yl)carbamoyl]-2-(trifluoromethyl)-1,3,4,9,10,10a-hexahydrophenanthren-2-yl] dihydrogen phosphate
- CAS Number: 1044535-58-1
- PubChem CID: 24872952
- ChemSpider: 32699790
- UNII: HPI19004QS
- KEGG: D10634
- ChEMBL: ChEMBL3137316
- CompTox Dashboard (EPA): DTXSID301100531

Chemical and physical data
- Formula: C_{29}H_{30}F_{3}N_{2}O_{5}P
- Molar mass: 574.537 g·mol^{−1}
- 3D model (JSmol): Interactive image
- SMILES: CC1=C(C=CC=N1)NC(=O)C2=CC3=C(C=C2)[C@@]4(CC[C@@](C[C@H]4CC3)(C(F)(F)F)OP(=O)(O)O)CC5=CC=CC=C5
- InChI: InChI=1S/C29H30F3N2O5P/c1-19-25(8-5-15-33-19)34-26(35)22-10-12-24-21(16-22)9-11-23-18-28(29(30,31)32,39-40(36,37)38)14-13-27(23,24)17-20-6-3-2-4-7-20/h2-8,10,12,15-16,23H,9,11,13-14,17-18H2,1H3,(H,34,35)(H2,36,37,38)/t23-,27+,28-/m1/s1; Key:BVXLAHSJXXSWFF-KEKPKEOLSA-N

Fosdagrocorat (developmental code names PF-04171327 and PF-4171327; also known as dagrocorat 2-(dihydrogen phosphate)) is a nonsteroidal but steroid-like selective glucocorticoid receptor modulator (SGRM) which was under development for the treatment of rheumatoid arthritis but was never marketed. It is the C2 dihydrogen phosphate ester of dagrocorat, and acts as a prodrug of dagrocorat with improved pharmacokinetics. The drug reached phase II clinical trials prior to the discontinuation of its development.

== See also ==
- AZD-5423
- Mapracorat
- Dagrocorat
