= Desoxycorticosterone acetate =

Steroid medication

Clinical data
- Trade names: Percorten Acetate, Decosterone, others
- Other names: DOCA; 11-Deoxycorticosterone 21-acetate; 21-Acetoxypregn-4-ene-3,20-dione
- Routes of administration: Intramuscular injection
- Drug class: Corticosteroid; Mineralocorticoid

Identifiers
- IUPAC name: [2-[(8S,9S,10R,13S,14S,17S)-10,13-dimethyl-3-oxo-1,2,6,7,8,9,11,12,14,15,16,17-dodecahydrocyclopenta[a]phenanthren-17-yl]-2-oxoethyl] acetate
- CAS Number: 56-47-3
- PubChem CID: 5952
- DrugBank: DB06780
- ChemSpider: 5737
- UNII: 6E0A168OB8
- KEGG: D03698
- ChEBI: CHEBI:34671
- ChEMBL: ChEMBL1200542
- CompTox Dashboard (EPA): DTXSID6022894
- ECHA InfoCard: 100.000.251

Chemical and physical data
- Formula: C_{23}H_{32}O_{4}
- Molar mass: 372.505 g·mol^{−1}
- 3D model (JSmol): Interactive image
- SMILES: CC(=O)OCC(=O)[C@H]1CC[C@@H]2[C@@]1(CC[C@H]3[C@H]2CCC4=CC(=O)CC[C@]34C)C
- InChI: InChI=1S/C23H32O4/c1-14(24)27-13-21(26)20-7-6-18-17-5-4-15-12-16(25)8-10-22(15,2)19(17)9-11-23(18,20)3/h12,17-20H,4-11,13H2,1-3H3/t17-,18-,19-,20+,22-,23-/m0/s1; Key:VPGRYOFKCNULNK-ACXQXYJUSA-N

Desoxycorticosterone acetate (also known as DOCA and 11-deoxycorticosterone 21-acetate and sold under the brand names Percorten Acetate and Decosterone, among others) is a mineralocorticoid medication and a mineralocorticoid ester. It is formulated as an oil solution and is administered once daily by intramuscular injection. The medication is the C21 acetate ester of 11-deoxycorticosterone.
