= Mapracorat =

Type of selective glucocorticoid receptor agonist

Clinical data
- Routes of administration: Topical (ointment, eye drops)
- ATC code: none

Legal status
- Legal status: Investigational

Identifiers
- IUPAC name: (2R)-1,1,1-trifluoro-4-(5-fluoro-2,3-dihydro-1-benzofuran-7-yl)-4-methyl-2-[[(2-methylquinolin-5-yl)amino]methyl]pentan-2-ol
- CAS Number: 887375-26-0
- PubChem CID: 24795088
- ChemSpider: 25104194
- UNII: 145V79YBVP
- KEGG: D10136
- CompTox Dashboard (EPA): DTXSID401029572
- ECHA InfoCard: 100.217.969

Chemical and physical data
- Formula: C_{25}H_{26}F_{4}N_{2}O_{2}
- Molar mass: 462.489 g·mol^{−1}
- 3D model (JSmol): Interactive image
- SMILES: c14OCCc4cc(F)cc1C(C)(C)CC(O)(C(F)(F)F)CNc(cccc2n3)c2ccc3C
- InChI: InChI=1S/C25H26F4N2O2/c1-15-7-8-18-20(5-4-6-21(18)31-15)30-14-24(32,25(27,28)29)13-23(2,3)19-12-17(26)11-16-9-10-33-22(16)19/h4-8,11-12,30,32H,9-10,13-14H2,1-3H3/t24-/m1/s1; Key:VJGFOYBQOIPQFY-XMMPIXPASA-N

Mapracorat (INN, code names BOL-303242-X, ZK-245186) is an anti-inflammatory drug belonging to the experimental class of selective glucocorticoid receptor agonists (SEGRAs). It is in clinical trials for the topical treatment of atopic dermatitis, inflammation following cataract surgery, and allergic conjunctivitis. Preliminary investigation for the treatment of keratoconjunctivitis sicca has been conducted in cellular models.

== Clinical trials ==
Phase II clinical trials with mapracorat started in summer 2009. One trial was a double blind dose finding study for an ointment against atopic dermatitis. It tested concentrations of 0.01%, 0.03% and 0.1% versus placebo over four weeks in around 64 patients. This trial was conducted by Intendis, a part of Bayer HealthCare Pharmaceuticals specialized on dermatology, and completed in September or October 2010. The other trial, also with a double blind design, evaluated an ophthalmic suspension for the treatment of inflammation following cataract surgery. Various concentrations and dosing schemes were tested versus placebo in about 550 patients. The study was conducted by Bausch & Lomb and completed in September 2010. Its successor study, a phase III trial, started in November 2010 and completed in August 2011.

As of January 2017 no study results are available.

== See also ==
- AZD-5423
- Dagrocorat
- Fosdagrocorat
