= Pseudo-Cushing's syndrome =

- Specialty: Endocrinology

Pseudo-Cushing's syndrome or non-neoplastic hypercortisolism is a medical condition in which patients display the signs, symptoms, and abnormal cortisol levels seen in Cushing's syndrome. However, pseudo-Cushing's syndrome is not caused by a problem with the hypothalamic-pituitary-adrenal axis as Cushing's is: it is mainly an idiopathic condition, though a cushingoid appearance is sometimes linked to excessive alcohol consumption. Elevated levels of total cortisol can also be due to estrogen found in oral contraceptive pills that contain a mixture of estrogen and progesterone. Estrogen can cause an increase of cortisol-binding globulin and thereby cause the total cortisol level to be elevated.

== Diagnosis ==
- Levels of cortisol and ACTH both elevated
- 24-hour urinary cortisol levels elevated
- Dexamethasone suppression test
- Late night salivary cortisol (LNSC)
- Loss of diurnal variation in cortisol levels (seen only in true Cushing's Syndrome)
- High mean corpuscular volume and gamma-glutamyl transferase may be clues to alcoholism
- Polyendocrine metabolic ovarian syndrome (PMOS) should be ruled out as it may have similar symptoms

=== Differential diagnosis ===
- Differentiation from Cushing's is difficult, but several tools exist to aid in the diagnosis
- Alternative causes of Cushing's should be excluded with imaging of lungs, adrenal glands, and pituitary gland; these often appear normal in Cushing's
- In the alcoholic patient with pseudo-Cushing's, admission to hospital (and avoidance of alcohol) will result in normal midnight cortisol levels within five days, excluding Cushing's
- Another cause for Cushing's syndrome is adrenocortical carcinoma. This is a rare form of cancer with an incidence of 1-2 per million people annually. About 60% of these cancers produce hormones, with cortisol being the most frequent. Most patients present in an advanced disease state and the outcome is dismal.

== Prognosis ==
- Blood results and symptoms normalise rapidly on cessation of drinking or remission of depression.
