= Transactivation =

Increased rate of gene expression

In the context of gene regulation, transactivation is the increased rate of gene expression triggered either by biological processes or by artificial means, through the expression of an intermediate transactivator protein.

In the context of receptor signaling, transactivation occurs when one or more receptors activate yet another; receptor transactivation may result from the crosstalk of signaling cascades or the activation of G protein–coupled receptor hetero-oligomer subunits, among other mechanisms.

== Natural transactivation ==
Transactivation can be triggered either by endogenous cellular or viral proteins, also called transactivators. These protein factors act in trans (i.e., intermolecularly). HIV and HTLV are two of the many viruses that encode transactivators to enhance viral gene expression. These transactivators can also be linked to cancer if they start interacting with, and increasing expression of, a cellular proto-oncogene. HTLV, for instance, has been associated with causing leukemia primarily through this process. Its transactivator, Tax, can interact with p40, inducing overexpression of interleukin 2, interleukin receptors, GM-CSF, and the transcription factor c-Fos. HTLV infects T-cells and, via the increased expression of these stimulatory cytokines and transcription factors, leads to uncontrolled proliferation of T-cells and hence lymphoma.

== Artificial transactivation ==
Artificial transactivation of a gene is achieved by inserting it into the genome at the appropriate area as transactivator gene adjoined to special promoter regions of DNA. The transactivator gene expresses a transcription factor that binds to specific promoter region of DNA. By binding to the promoter region of a gene, the transcription factor causes that gene to be expressed. The expression of one transactivator gene can activate multiple genes, as long as they have the same, specific promoter region attached. Because the expression of the transactivator gene can be controlled, transactivation can be used to turn genes on and off. If this specific promoter region is also attached to a reporter gene, then one can measure when the transactivator is being expressed.

== See also ==
- Transrepression
- Selective glucocorticoid receptor agonist
