= Relacorilant =

Chemical compound

Clinical data
- Trade names: Lifyorli
- Other names: CORT-125134
- AHFS/Drugs.com: Monograph
- MedlinePlus: a626056
- License data: US DailyMed: Relacorilant
- Routes of administration: By mouth
- Drug class: Antiglucocorticoid
- ATC code: None

Legal status
- Legal status: US: ℞-only

Identifiers
- IUPAC name: [(4aR)-1-(4-Fluorophenyl)-6-(1-methylpyrazol-4-yl)sulfonyl-4,5,7,8-tetrahydropyrazolo[3,4-g]isoquinolin-4a-yl]-[4-(trifluoromethyl)pyridin-2-yl]methanone
- CAS Number: 1496510-51-0
- PubChem CID: 73051463
- DrugBank: DB14976
- ChemSpider: 57617720
- UNII: 2158753C7E
- KEGG: D11336

Chemical and physical data
- Formula: C_{27}H_{22}F_{4}N_{6}O_{3}S
- Molar mass: 586.57 g·mol^{−1}
- 3D model (JSmol): Interactive image
- SMILES: CN1C=C(C=N1)S(=O)(=O)N2CCC3=CC4=C(C[C@@]3(C2)C(=O)C5=NC=CC(=C5)C(F)(F)F)C=NN4C6=CC=C(C=C6)F
- InChI: InChI=1S/C27H22F4N6O3S/c1-35-15-22(14-33-35)41(39,40)36-9-7-18-11-24-17(13-34-37(24)21-4-2-20(28)3-5-21)12-26(18,16-36)25(38)23-10-19(6-8-32-23)27(29,30)31/h2-6,8,10-11,13-15H,7,9,12,16H2,1H3/t26-/m0/s1; Key:WANIDIGFXJFFEL-SANMLTNESA-N

Relacorilant, sold under the brand name Lifyorli, is an anti-cancer medication used for the treatment of ovarian cancer, fallopian tube cancer, or primary peritoneal cancer. Relacorilant is a glucocorticoid receptor antagonist. It is taken by mouth.

The most common adverse reactions include decreased hemoglobin, decreased neutrophils, fatigue, nausea, diarrhea, decreased platelets, rash, and decreased appetite.

Relacorilant was approved for medical use in the United States in March 2026.

== Medical uses ==
Relacorilant is indicated in combination with nab-paclitaxel for the treatment of adults with platinum-resistant epithelial ovarian, fallopian tube, or primary peritoneal cancer who have received one to three prior systemic treatment regimens, at least one of which included bevacizumab.

== Adverse effects ==
The US prescribing information includes a contraindication for people who require corticosteroids for a lifesaving indication as well as warnings and precautions for neutropenia and severe infections, adrenal insufficiency, exacerbation of conditions treated with glucocorticoids, and embryo-fetal toxicity. The most common adverse reactions include decreased hemoglobin, decreased neutrophils, fatigue, nausea, diarrhea, decreased platelets, rash, and decreased appetite.

== History ==
Efficacy was evaluated in ROSELLA (NCT05257408), a multi-center, open-label, trial in 381 participants with platinum-resistant epithelial ovarian, fallopian tube, or primary peritoneal cancer. Participants were permitted to receive up to three prior lines of systemic therapy and prior bevacizumab was required. The trial excluded participants who required chronic or frequent use of glucocorticoids. Participants were randomized (1:1) to receive relacorilant in combination with nab-paclitaxel or nab-paclitaxel alone.

== Society and culture ==
=== Legal status ===
Relacorilant was approved for medical use in the United States in March 2026.

In September 2026, the Committee for Medicinal Products for Human Use of the European Medicines Agency adopted a positive opinion, recommending the granting of a marketing authorization for the medicinal product Lifyorli, intended for the treatment of adults with epithelial ovarian, fallopian tube, or primary peritoneal cancer. The applicant for this medicinal product is Corcept Therapeutics Netherlands.

=== Names ===
Relacorilant is the international nonproprietary name.

Relacorilant is sold under the brand name Lifyorli.
