= Glucocorticoid =

Class of corticosteroids

- Drug class
- Chemical structure of cortisol (hydrocortisone), an endogenous glucocorticoid as well as a medication.

Class identifiers
- Synonyms: Corticosteroid; Glucocorticosteroid
- Use: Adrenal insufficiency; allergic, inflammatory, and autoimmune disorders; asthma; organ transplant
- ATC code: H02AB
- Biological target: Glucocorticoid receptor
- Chemical class: Steroids

Legal status

Glucocorticoids (or, less commonly, glucocorticosteroids) are a class of corticosteroids, which are in turn a class of steroid hormones. Glucocorticoids are corticosteroids that bind to the glucocorticoid receptor that is present in almost every vertebrate animal cell. The name "glucocorticoid" is a portmanteau of "glucose", "cortex", and "steroid", referring to its role in regulating the metabolism of glucose, its synthesis in the adrenal cortex, and its steroidal structure.

Glucocorticoids are part of the feedback mechanism in the immune system, which reduces certain aspects of immune function, such as inflammation. They are therefore used in medicine to treat diseases caused by an overactive immune system, such as allergies, asthma, autoimmune diseases, and sepsis. Glucocorticoids have many side effects, including adverse drug reactions. They also interfere with some of the abnormal mechanisms in cancer cells, so they are used in high doses to treat cancer. In particular, they inhibit lymphocyte proliferation, which is significant for lymphomas and leukemias. They can also lessen some side effects of chemotherapy (anticancer drugs).

Glucocorticoids affect cells by binding to the glucocorticoid receptor. The activated glucocorticoid receptor-glucocorticoid complex up-regulates the expression of anti-inflammatory proteins in the nucleus (a process known as transactivation) and represses the expression of pro-inflammatory proteins in the cytosol by preventing the translocation of other transcription factors from the cytosol into the nucleus (transrepression).

Glucocorticoids are distinguished from mineralocorticoids and sex steroids by their specific receptors, target cells, and effects. In technical terms, "corticosteroid" refers to both glucocorticoids and mineralocorticoids (as both are mimics of hormones produced by the adrenal cortex), but is often used as a synonym for "glucocorticoid". Glucocorticoids are chiefly produced in the zona fasciculata of the adrenal cortex, whereas mineralocorticoids are synthesized in the zona glomerulosa.

Cortisol (or hydrocortisone) is the most important human glucocorticoid and is essential. It regulates and supports important cardiovascular, metabolic, immunologic, and homeostatic functions. Increases in glucocorticoid concentrations are an integral part of stress response and are the most commonly used biomarkers to measure stress. Glucocorticoids have numerous non-stress-related functions as well, and glucocorticoid concentrations can increase in response to pleasure or excitement. Various synthetic glucocorticoids are available; these are widely utilized in general medical practice and numerous specialties, either as replacement therapy in glucocorticoid deficiency or to suppress the body's immune system.

== Effects ==
Steroidogenesis showing glucocorticoids in green ellipse at right with the primary example being cortisol It is not a strictly bounded group, but a continuum of structures with increasing glucocorticoid effect.

Glucocorticoid effects may be broadly classified into two major categories: immunological and metabolic. In addition, glucocorticoids play important roles in fetal development and body fluid homeostasis.

=== Immune ===
Glucocorticoids function via interaction with the glucocorticoid receptor:

- Upregulate the expression of anti-inflammatory proteins.
- Downregulate the expression of proinflammatory proteins.

Glucocorticoids are also shown to play a role in the development and homeostasis of T lymphocytes. This has been shown in transgenic mice with either increased or decreased sensitivity of T cell lineage to glucocorticoids.

=== Metabolic ===
The name "glucocorticoid" derives from early observations that these hormones were involved in glucose metabolism. In the fasted state, cortisol stimulates several processes that collectively serve to increase and maintain normal concentrations of glucose in the blood.

Metabolic effects:

- Stimulation of gluconeogenesis, particularly in the liver: This pathway results in the synthesis of glucose from non-hexose substrates, such as amino acids and glycerol from triglyceride breakdown, and is particularly important in carnivores and certain herbivores. Enhancing the expression of enzymes involved in gluconeogenesis is probably the best-known metabolic function of glucocorticoids.
- Mobilization of amino acids from extrahepatic tissues: These serve as substrates for gluconeogenesis.
- Inhibition of glucose uptake in muscle and adipose tissue: A mechanism to conserve glucose
- Stimulation of fat breakdown in adipose tissue: The fatty acids released by lipolysis are used for production of energy in tissues like muscle, and the released glycerol provides another substrate for gluconeogenesis.
- Increase in sodium retention and potassium excretion leading to hypernatremia and hypokalemia
- Increase in hemoglobin concentration, likely due to hindrance of red blood cell ingestion by macrophages or other phagocytes.
- Increased urinary uric acid
- Increased urinary calcium and hypocalcemia
- Alkalosis
- Leukocytosis

Excessive glucocorticoid levels resulting from administration as a drug or hyperadrenocorticism have effects on many systems. Some examples include inhibition of bone formation, suppression of calcium absorption (both of which can lead to osteoporosis), delayed wound healing, muscle weakness, and increased risk of infection. These observations suggest a multitude of less-dramatic physiologic roles for glucocorticoids.

=== Developmental ===
Glucocorticoids have multiple effects on fetal development. An important example is their role in promoting maturation of the lung and production of the surfactant necessary for extrauterine lung function. Mice with homozygous disruptions in the corticotropin-releasing hormone gene (see below) die at birth due to pulmonary immaturity. In addition, glucocorticoids are necessary for normal brain development, by initiating terminal maturation, remodeling axons and dendrites, and affecting cell survival and may also play a role in hippocampal development. Glucocorticoids stimulate the maturation of the Na^{+}/K^{+}/ATPase, nutrient transporters, and digestion enzymes, promoting the development of a functioning gastro-intestinal system. Glucocorticoids also support the development of the neonate's renal system by increasing glomerular filtration.

=== Arousal and cognition ===
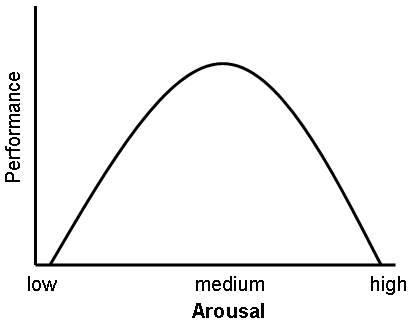
A graphical representation of the Yerkes–Dodson curve

Glucocorticoids act on the hippocampus, amygdala, and frontal lobes. Along with adrenaline, these enhance the formation of flashbulb memories of events associated with strong emotions, both positive and negative. This has been confirmed in studies, whereby blockade of either glucocorticoids or noradrenaline activity impaired the recall of emotionally relevant information. Additional sources have shown subjects whose fear learning was accompanied by high cortisol levels had better consolidation of this memory (this effect was more important in men). The effect that glucocorticoids have on memory may be due to damage specifically to the CA1 area of the hippocampal formation.

In multiple animal studies, prolonged stress (causing prolonged increases in glucocorticoid levels) have shown destruction of the neurons in the hippocampus area of the brain, which has been connected to lower memory performance.

Glucocorticoids have also been shown to have a significant impact on vigilance, cognition and memory. This appears to follow the curve described by Yerkes–Dodson law, as studies have shown circulating levels of glucocorticoids vs. memory performance follow an upside-down U pattern. For example, long-term potentiation (LTP; the process of forming long-term memories) is optimal when glucocorticoid levels are mildly elevated, whereas significant decreases of LTP are observed after adrenalectomy (low-glucocorticoid state) or after exogenous glucocorticoid administration (high-glucocorticoid state). Elevated levels of glucocorticoids enhance memory for emotionally arousing events, but lead more often than not to poor memory for material unrelated to the source of stress/emotional arousal. In contrast to the dose-dependent enhancing effects of glucocorticoids on memory consolidation, these stress hormones have been shown to inhibit the retrieval of already stored information. Long-term exposure to glucocorticoid medications, such as asthma and anti-inflammatory medication, has been shown to create deficits in memory and attention both during and, to a lesser extent, after treatment, a condition known as "steroid dementia".

=== Body fluid homeostasis ===
Glucocorticoids could act centrally, as well as peripherally, to assist in the normalization of extracellular fluid volume by regulating body's action to atrial natriuretic peptide (ANP). Centrally, glucocorticoids could inhibit dehydration-induced water intake; peripherally, glucocorticoids could induce a potent diuresis.

== Medical uses ==
Glucocorticoids may be used in low doses in adrenal insufficiency. In much higher doses, oral or inhaled glucocorticoids are used to suppress various allergic, inflammatory, and autoimmune disorders. Inhaled glucocorticoids are the second-line treatment for asthma. They are also administered as post-transplantory immunosuppressants to prevent the acute transplant rejection and the graft-versus-host disease. Nevertheless, they do not prevent an infection and also inhibit later reparative processes. Newly emerging evidence showed that glucocorticoids could be used in the treatment of heart failure to increase the renal responsiveness to diuretics and natriuretic peptides. Glucocorticoids are historically used for pain relief in inflammatory conditions. However, corticosteroids show limited efficacy in pain relief and potential adverse events for their use in tendinopathies.

=== Replacement ===
Any glucocorticoid can be given in a dose that provides approximately the same glucocorticoid effects as normal cortisol production; this is referred to as physiologic, replacement, or maintenance dosing. This is approximately 6–12 mg/m^{2}/day of hydrocortisone (m^{2} refers to body surface area (BSA), and is a measure of body size; an average man's BSA is 1.9 m^{2}).

=== Therapeutic immunosuppression ===
Glucocorticoids cause immunosuppression, and the therapeutic component of this effect is mainly the decreases in the function and numbers of lymphocytes, including both B cells and T cells.

The major mechanism for this immunosuppression is through inhibition of nuclear factor kappa-light-chain-enhancer of activated B cells (NF-κB). NF-κB is a critical transcription factor involved in the synthesis of many mediators (i.e., cytokines) and proteins (i.e., adhesion proteins) that promote the immune response. Inhibition of this transcription factor, therefore, blunts the capacity of the immune system to mount a response.

Glucocorticoids suppress cell-mediated immunity by inhibiting genes that code for the cytokines IL-1, IL-2, IL-3, IL-4, IL-5, IL-6, IL-8 and IFN-γ, the most important of which is IL-2. Smaller cytokine production reduces the T cell proliferation.

Glucocorticoids, however, not only reduce T cell proliferation, but also lead to another well known effect – glucocorticoid-induced apoptosis. The effect is more prominent in immature T cells still inside in the thymus, but peripheral T cells are also affected. The exact mechanism regulating this glucocorticoid sensitivity lies in the Bcl-2 gene.

Glucocorticoids also suppress the humoral (antibody-mediated) immunity, thereby causing a humoral immune deficiency. Glucocorticoids cause B cells to express smaller amounts of IL-2 and of IL-2 receptors. This diminishes both B cell clone expansion and antibody synthesis. The diminished amounts of IL-2 also cause fewer T lymphocyte cells to be activated.

The effect of glucocorticoids on Fc receptor expression in immune cells is complicated. Dexamethasone decreases IFN-γ stimulated Fc gamma RI expression in neutrophils while conversely causing an increase in monocytes. Glucocorticoids may also decrease the expression of Fc receptors in macrophages, but the evidence supporting this regulation in earlier studies has been questioned. The effect of Fc receptor expression in macrophages is important since it is necessary for the phagocytosis of opsonised cells. This is because Fc receptors bind antibodies attached to cells targeted for destruction by macrophages.

=== Anti-inflammatory ===
Glucocorticoids are potent anti-inflammatories, regardless of the inflammation's cause; their primary anti-inflammatory mechanism is lipocortin-1 (annexin-1) synthesis. Lipocortin-1 both suppresses phospholipase A2, thereby blocking eicosanoid production, and inhibits various leukocyte inflammatory events (epithelial adhesion, chemotaxis, phagocytosis, respiratory burst, etc.). In other words, glucocorticoids not only suppress immune response, but also inhibit the two main products of inflammation, prostaglandins and leukotrienes. They inhibit prostaglandin synthesis at the level of phospholipase A2 as well as at the level of cyclooxygenase/PGE isomerase (COX-1 and COX-2), the latter effect being much like that of NSAIDs, thus potentiating the anti-inflammatory effect.

In addition, glucocorticoids also suppress cyclooxygenase expression.

Glucocorticoids marketed as anti-inflammatories are often topical formulations, such as nasal sprays for rhinitis or inhalers for asthma. These preparations have the advantage of only affecting the targeted area, thereby reducing side effects or potential interactions. In this case, the main compounds used are beclometasone, budesonide, fluticasone, mometasone and ciclesonide. In rhinitis, sprays are used. For asthma, glucocorticoids are administered as inhalants with a metered-dose or dry powder inhaler. In rare cases, symptoms of Radiation-induced thyroiditis has been treated with oral glucocorticoids.

=== Hyperaldosteronism ===
Glucocorticoids can be used in the management of familial hyperaldosteronism type 1. They are not effective, however, for use in the type 2 condition.

=== Heart failure ===
Glucocorticoids could be used in the treatment of decompensated heart failure to potentiate renal responsiveness to diuretics, especially in heart failure patients with refractory diuretic resistance with large doses of loop diuretics.

== Mechanism of action ==
=== Transactivation ===
Glucocorticoids bind to the cytosolic glucocorticoid receptor, a type of nuclear receptor that is activated by ligand binding. After a hormone binds to the corresponding receptor, the newly formed complex translocates itself into the cell nucleus, where it binds to glucocorticoid response elements in the promoter region of the target genes resulting in the regulation of gene expression. This process is commonly referred to as transcriptional activation, or transactivation.

The proteins encoded by these up-regulated genes have a wide range of effects, including, for example:

- Anti-inflammatory – lipocortin I, p11/calpactin binding protein, secretory leukocyte protease inhibitor 1 (SLPI), and Mitogen-activated protein kinase phosphatase (MAPK phosphatase)
- Increased gluconeogenesis – glucose 6-phosphatase and tyrosine aminotransferase

=== Transrepression ===
The opposite mechanism is called transcriptional repression, or transrepression. The classical understanding of this mechanism is that activated glucocorticoid receptor binds to DNA in the same site where another transcription factor would bind, which prevents the transcription of genes that are transcribed via the activity of that factor. While this does occur, the results are not consistent for all cell types and conditions; there is no generally accepted, general mechanism for transrepression.

New mechanisms are being discovered where transcription is repressed, but the activated glucocorticoid receptor is not interacting with DNA, but rather with another transcription factor directly, thus interfering with it, or with other proteins that interfere with the function of other transcription factors. This latter mechanism appears to be the most likely way that activated glucocorticoid receptor interferes with NF-κB – namely by recruiting histone deacetylase, which deacetylate the DNA in the promoter region leading to closing of the chromatin structure where NF-κB needs to bind.

=== Nongenomic effects ===
Activated glucocorticoid receptor has effects that have been experimentally shown to be independent of any effects on transcription and can only be due to direct binding of activated glucocorticoid receptor with other proteins or with mRNA.

For example, Src kinase which binds to inactive glucocorticoid receptor, is released when a glucocorticoid binds to glucocorticoid receptor, and phosphorylates a protein that in turn displaces an adaptor protein from a receptor important in inflammation, epidermal growth factor, reducing its activity, which in turn results in reduced creation of arachidonic acid – a key proinflammatory molecule. This is one mechanism by which glucocorticoids have an anti-inflammatory effect.

== Pharmacology ==
Dexamethasone – a synthetic glucocorticoid binds more powerfully to the glucocorticoid receptor than cortisol does. Dexamethasone is based on the cortisol structure but differs at three positions (extra double bond in the A-ring between carbons 1 and 2 and addition of a 9-α-fluoro group and a 16-α-methyl substituent).

A variety of synthetic glucocorticoids, some far more potent than cortisol, have been created for therapeutic use. They differ in both pharmacokinetics (absorption factor, half-life, volume of distribution, clearance) and pharmacodynamics (for example the capacity of mineralocorticoid activity: retention of sodium (Na^{+}) and water; renal physiology). Because they permeate the intestines easily, they are administered primarily per os (by mouth), but also by other methods, such as topically on skin. More than 90% of them bind different plasma proteins, though with a different binding specificity. Endogenous glucocorticoids and some synthetic corticoids have high affinity to the protein transcortin (also called corticosteroid-binding globulin), whereas all of them bind serum albumin. In the liver, they quickly metabolize by conjugation with a sulfate or glucuronic acid, and are secreted in the urine.

Glucocorticoid potency, duration of effect, and the overlapping mineralocorticoid potency vary. Cortisol is the standard of comparison for glucocorticoid potency. "Hydrocortisone" is the name used for pharmaceutical preparations of cortisol.

The data below refer to oral administration. Oral potency may be less than parenteral potency because significant amounts (up to 50% in some cases) may not reach the circulation. Fludrocortisone acetate and deoxycorticosterone acetate are, by definition, mineralocorticoids rather than glucocorticoids, but they do have minor glucocorticoid potency and are included in this table to provide perspective on mineralocorticoid potency.

Comparative oral corticosteroid potencies
Name	Glucocorticoid potency	Mineralocorticoid potency	Terminal half-life (hours)
Cortisol (hydrocortisone)	1	1	8
Cortisone	0.8	0.8	8
Prednisone	3.5–5	0.8	16–36
Prednisolone	4	0.8	16–36
Methylprednisolone	5–7.5	0.5	18–40
Dexamethasone	25–80	0	36–54
Betamethasone	25–30	0	36–54
Triamcinolone	5	0	12–36
Deflazacort	6.5	–	1.3
Fludrocortisone acetate	15	200	24
Deoxycorticosterone acetate	0	20	–
Aldosterone	0.3	200–1000	–
Beclometasone	8 sprays 4 times every day equivalent to orally 14 mg prednisone once a day	–	–

Characteristics of Synthetic Glucocorticoids
Synthetic Glucocorticoid	Equivalent Dose (mg)	Anti-inflammatory Activity^{1}	Mineralocorticoid Activity^{1}	Biological Half Life (hrs)	References
Short-to medium-acting glucocorticoids
Hydrocortisone	20	1	1	8–12	
Cortisone	25	0.8	0.8	8–12	
Prednisone	5	4	0.3	12–36	
Prednisolone	5	4–5	0.3	12–36	
Methylprednisolone	4	5	0.25–0.5	12–36	
Meprednisone	4	5	0		
Intermediate-acting glucocorticoids
Triamcinolone	4	5	0	12–36	
Paramethasone	2	10	0	N/A	
Fluprednisolone	1.5	15	0		
Long-acting glucocorticoids
Betamethasone	0.6	25–40	0	36–72	
Dexamethasone	0.75	30	0	36–72	
Mineralocorticoids
Fludrocortisone	2	10	250	18–36	
Desoxycorticosterone acetate		0	20		
^{1} Activity is relative to hydrocortisone

== Adverse effects ==
Glucocorticoid drugs currently being used act nonselectively, so in the long run they may impair many healthy anabolic processes. To prevent this, much research has been focused recently on the elaboration of selectively acting glucocorticoid drugs. Side effects include:

- Immunodeficiency (see section below)
- Hyperglycemia due to increased gluconeogenesis, insulin resistance, and impaired glucose tolerance ("steroid diabetes"); caution in those with diabetes mellitus
- Increased skin fragility, easy bruising
- Negative calcium balance due to reduced intestinal calcium absorption
- Steroid-induced osteoporosis: reduced bone density (osteoporosis, osteonecrosis, higher fracture risk, slower fracture repair)
- Weight gain due to increased visceral and truncal fat deposition (central obesity) and appetite stimulation; see corticosteroid-induced lipodystrophy
- Hypercortisolemia with prolonged or excessive use (also known as exogenous Cushing's syndrome)
- Impaired memory and attention deficits See steroid dementia syndrome.
- Adrenal insufficiency (if used for long time and stopped suddenly without a taper)
- Muscle and tendon breakdown (proteolysis), weakness, reduced muscle mass and repair
- Expansion of malar fat pads and dilation of small blood vessels in skin
- Lipomatosis within the epidural space
- Excitatory effect on central nervous system (euphoria, psychosis)
- Anovulation, irregularity of menstrual periods
- Growth failure, delayed puberty
- Increased plasma amino acids, increased urea formation, negative nitrogen balance
- Glaucoma due to increased ocular pressure
- Cataracts
- Topical steroid withdrawal

In high doses, hydrocortisone (cortisol) and those glucocorticoids with appreciable mineralocorticoid potency can exert a mineralocorticoid effect as well, although in physiologic doses this is prevented by rapid degradation of cortisol by 11β-hydroxysteroid dehydrogenase isoenzyme 2 (11β-HSD2) in mineralocorticoid target tissues. Mineralocorticoid effects can include salt and water retention, extracellular fluid volume expansion, hypertension, potassium depletion, and metabolic alkalosis.

=== Immunodeficiency ===
Glucocorticoids cause immunosuppression, decreasing the function and/or numbers of neutrophils, lymphocytes (including both B cells and T cells), monocytes, macrophages, and the anatomical barrier function of the skin. This suppression, if large enough, can cause manifestations of immunodeficiency, including T cell deficiency, humoral immune deficiency and neutropenia.

Main pathogens of concern in glucocorticoid-induced immunodeficiency:
Bacteria	Enterobacteriaceae including Salmonella species; Legionella micdadei; Listeria monocytogenes; Mycobacterium tuberculosis; Nontuberculous mycobacteria; Nocardia asteroides; Rhodococcus equi; Staphylococcus aureus; Streptococci
Fungi	Aspergillus; Blastomyces; Candida species including Candida albicans; Coccidioides immitis; Cryptococcus neoformans; Fusarium species; Histoplasma capsulatum; Talaromyces marneffei; Pneumocystis jirovecii; Pseudallescheria boydii; Zygomycosis
Viruses	Adenovirus; Cytomegalovirus; Herpes simplex virus; Human papillomavirus; Influenza/parainfluenza; Respiratory syncytial virus; Varicella zoster
Other	Cryptosporidiosis/Isospora belli; Strongyloides stercoralis; Toxoplasma gondii

=== Withdrawal ===
In addition to the effects listed above, use of high-dose glucocorticoids for only a few days begins to produce suppression of the patient's adrenal glands suppressing hypothalamic corticotropin-releasing hormone (CRH) leading to suppressed production of adrenocorticotropic hormone (ACTH) by the anterior pituitary. With prolonged suppression, the adrenal glands atrophy (physically shrink), and can take months to recover full function after discontinuation of the exogenous glucocorticoid.

During this recovery time, the patient is vulnerable to adrenal insufficiency during times of stress, such as illness. While suppressive dose and time for adrenal recovery vary widely, clinical guidelines have been devised to estimate potential adrenal suppression and recovery, to reduce risk to the patient. The following is one example:

- If patients have been receiving daily high doses for five days or less, they can be abruptly stopped (or reduced to physiologic replacement if patients are adrenal-deficient). Full adrenal recovery can be assumed to occur by a week afterward.
- If high doses were used for six to 10 days, reduce to replacement dose immediately and taper over four more days. Adrenal recovery can be assumed to occur within two to four weeks of completion of steroids.
- If high doses were used for 11–30 days, cut immediately to twice replacement, and then by 25% every four days. Stop entirely when dose is less than half of replacement. Full adrenal recovery should occur within one to three months of completion of withdrawal.
- If high doses were used more than 30 days, cut dose immediately to twice replacement, and reduce by 25% each week until replacement is reached. Then change to oral hydrocortisone or cortisone as a single morning dose, and gradually decrease by 2.5 mg each week. When the morning dose is less than replacement, the return of normal basal adrenal function may be documented by checking 0800 cortisol levels prior to the morning dose; stop drugs when 0800 cortisol is 10 μg/dl. Predicting the time to full adrenal recovery after prolonged suppressive exogenous steroids is difficult; some people may take nearly a year.
- Flare-up of the underlying condition for which steroids are given may require a more gradual taper than outlined above.

== Resistance ==
Corticosteroid resistance mechanisms

Resistance to the therapeutic uses of glucocorticoids can present difficulty; for instance, 25% of cases of severe asthma may be unresponsive to steroids. This may be the result of genetic predisposition, ongoing exposure to the cause of the inflammation (such as allergens), immunological phenomena that bypass glucocorticoids, pharmacokinetic disturbances (incomplete absorption or accelerated excretion or metabolism) and viral and/or bacterial respiratory infections.

== Pharmacogenetics ==
=== Asthma ===
Patients' response to inhaled corticosteroids has some basis in genetic variations. Two genes of interest are CHRH1 (corticotropin-releasing hormone receptor 1) and TBX21 (transcription factor T-bet). Both genes display some degree of polymorphic variation in humans, which may explain how some patients respond better to inhaled corticosteroid therapy than others. However, not all asthma patients respond to corticosteroids and large sub groups of asthma patients are corticosteroid resistant.

A study funded by the Patient-Centered Outcomes Research Institute of children and teens with mild persistent asthma found that using the control inhaler as needed worked the same as daily use in improving asthma control, number of asthma flares, how well the lungs work, and quality of life. Children and teens using the inhaler as needed used about one-fourth the amount of corticosteroid medicine as children and teens using it daily.

== See also ==
- List of corticosteroids
- List of corticosteroid cyclic ketals
- List of corticosteroid esters
- Aminoglutethimide blocks glucocorticoid secretion
- GITR (glucocorticoid-induced TNF receptor)
- Glucocorticoid receptor
- Immunosuppressive drug
- Membrane glucocorticoid receptor
- Metyrapone blocks glucocorticoid secretion
- Selective glucocorticoid receptor agonist
- Topical glucocorticoids
- Topical steroid
- Steroid atrophy
- Topical steroid withdrawal
- Non-steroidal anti-inflammatory drug (NSAID)
