= Addison's disease =

Endocrine disorder

- Other names: Addison disease, primary adrenal insufficiency, primary adrenocortical insufficiency, chronic adrenal insufficiency, chronic adrenocortical insufficiency, primary hypocorticalism, primary hypocortisolism, primary hypoadrenocorticism, primary hypocorticism, primary hypoadrenalism
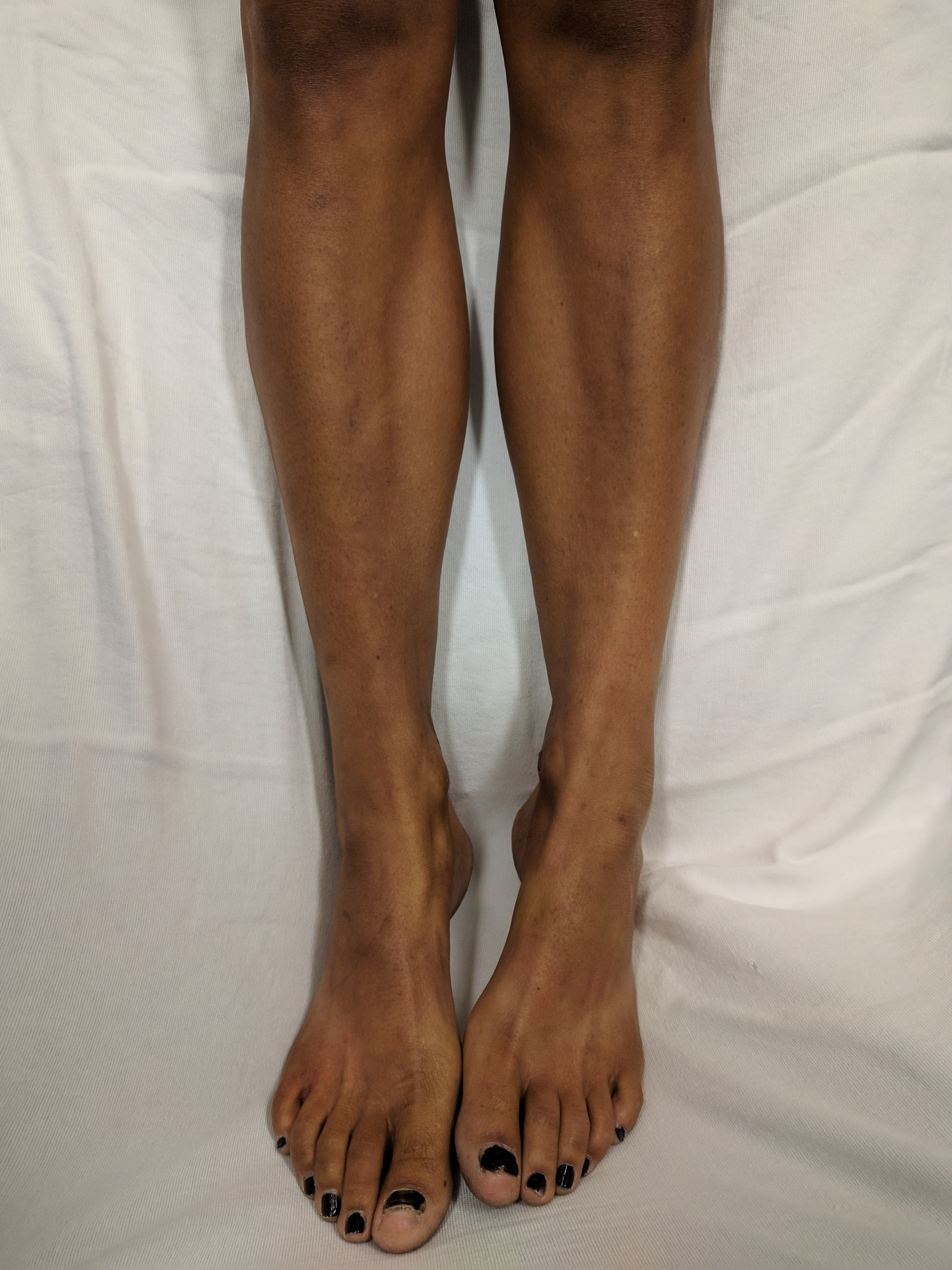
- Darkening of the skin seen on the legs of an otherwise pale-skinned patient
- Specialty: Endocrinology
- Symptoms: Abdominal pain, weakness, weight loss, darkening of the skin
- Complications: Adrenal crisis
- Usual onset: Middle-aged females
- Causes: Problems with the adrenal gland
- Diagnostic method: Blood tests, urine tests, medical imaging
- Treatment: Synthetic corticosteroid such as hydrocortisone and fludrocortisone
- Frequency: 0.9–1.4 per 10,000 people (developed world)
- Deaths: Doubles risk of death
- Named after: Thomas Addison

Addison's disease, also known as primary adrenal insufficiency, is a rare long-term endocrine disorder characterized by inadequate production of the cortisol and aldosterone by the two outer layers of the cells of the adrenal glands (adrenal cortex), causing adrenal insufficiency. Symptoms generally develop slowly and insidiously and may include abdominal pain and gastrointestinal abnormalities, weakness, and weight loss. Darkening of the skin in certain areas may also occur. Under certain circumstances, an adrenal crisis may occur with low blood pressure, vomiting, lower back pain, and loss of consciousness. Mood changes may also occur. Rapid onset of symptoms indicates acute adrenal failure, which is a clinical emergency. An adrenal crisis can be triggered by stress, such as from an injury, surgery, or infection.

Addison's disease arises when the adrenal gland does not produce sufficient amounts of the cortisol and (sometimes) aldosterone. It is an autoimmune disease which affects some genetically predisposed people in whom the body's own immune system has started to target the adrenal glands. In many adult cases it is unclear what has triggered the onset of this disease, though it sometimes follows tuberculosis. Causes can include certain medications, sepsis, and bleeding into both adrenal glands. Addison's disease is generally diagnosed by blood tests, urine tests, and medical imaging.

Treatment involves replacing the absent or low hormones. This involves taking a synthetic corticosteroid, such as hydrocortisone or fludrocortisone. These medications are typically taken orally. Lifelong, continuous steroid replacement therapy is required, with regular follow-up treatment and monitoring for other health problems which may occur. A high-salt diet may also be useful in some people. If symptoms worsen, an injection of corticosteroid is recommended (people need to carry a dose with them at all times). Often, large amounts of intravenous fluids with the sugar dextrose are also required. With appropriate treatment, the overall outcome is generally favorable, and most people are able to lead a reasonably normal life. Without treatment, an adrenal crisis can result in death.

Addison's disease affects about 9 to 14 per 100,000 people in the developed world. It occurs most frequently in middle-aged females. The disease is named after Thomas Addison, a graduate of the University of Edinburgh Medical School, who first described the condition in 1855.

== Signs and symptoms ==
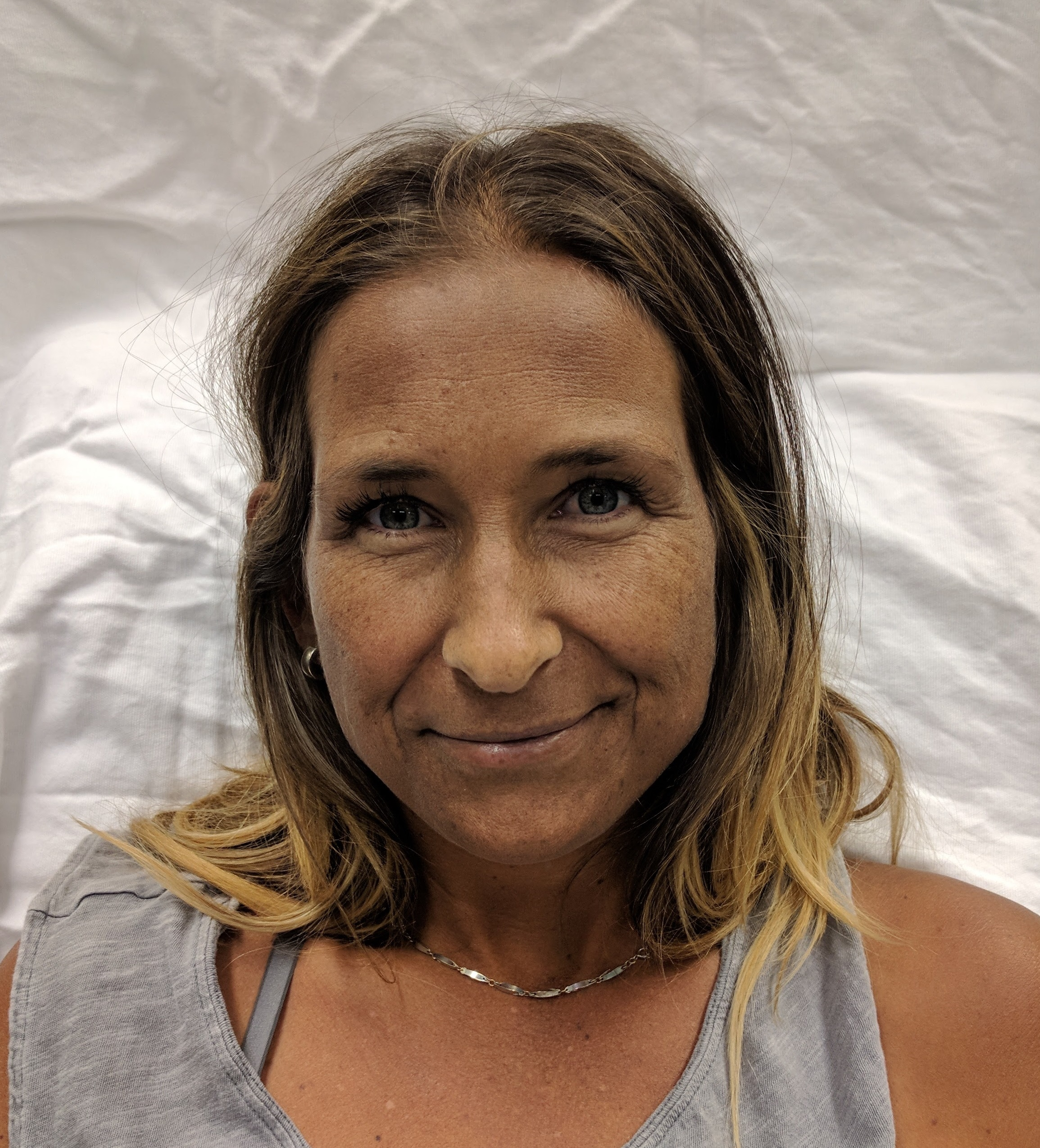
Hyperpigmentation as seen in a woman with Addison's disease

The symptoms of Addison's disease can develop over several months and resemble other medical conditions. Most common symptoms are caused by low levels of hormones that would normally be produced by the adrenal glands. Low blood cortisol can cause a variety of symptoms, including fatigue, malaise, muscle and joint pain, reduced appetite, weight loss, and increased sensitivity to cold. Gastrointestinal symptoms such as nausea, abdominal pain, and vomiting are particularly common. Low aldosterone can cause affected people to crave salty foods, as well as develop low blood pressure that leads to dizziness upon standing. In women, low dehydroepiandrosterone (DHEA) can result in dry and itchy skin, loss of armpit and pubic hair, and reduced sexual drive. Young children with Addison's disease may have insufficient weight gain and recurrent infections. Low cortisol also interferes with adrenocorticotropic hormone (ACTH) regulation, sometimes resulting in the darkening of the skin and mucous membranes, particularly in areas exposed to sun or regular friction.

Blood tests in people with Addison's disease often reveal low blood sodium. Many also have high blood potassium and/or high thyroid-stimulating hormone (TSH).

Most people with Addison's disease develop or have a preexisting autoimmune disease. Particularly common comorbid conditions are autoimmune thyroid disease (40% of people with Addison's), premature ovarian failure (up to 16% of people with Addison's), type 1 diabetes (11%), pernicious anemia (10%), vitiligo (6%) and celiac disease (2%). The combination of Addison's disease in addition to mucocutaneous candidiasis, hypoparathyroidism, or both, is called autoimmune polyendocrine syndrome type 1. The presence of Addison's in addition to autoimmune thyroid disease, type 1 diabetes, or both, is called autoimmune polyendocrine syndrome type 2.

=== Adrenal crisis ===
An "adrenal crisis" or "Addisonian crisis" is a constellation of symptoms that indicates severe adrenal insufficiency. This may be the result of either previously undiagnosed Addison's disease, a disease process suddenly affecting adrenal function (such as adrenal hemorrhage), or an intercurrent problem (e.g., infection, trauma) in someone known to have Addison's disease. It is a medical emergency and potentially life-threatening situation requiring immediate emergency treatment.

Characteristic symptoms are:

- Sudden penetrating pain in the legs, lower back, or abdomen
- Severe vomiting and diarrhea, resulting in dehydration
- Low blood pressure
- Syncope (loss of consciousness and ability to stand)
- Hypoglycemia (reduced level of blood glucose)
- Confusion, psychosis, slurred speech
- Severe lethargy
- Hyponatremia (low sodium level in the blood)
- Hyperkalemia (elevated potassium level in the blood)
- Hypercalcemia (elevated calcium level in the blood)
- Convulsions
- Fever

== Causes ==
The negative feedback loop for glucocorticoids

Causes of adrenal insufficiency can be categorized by the mechanism through which they cause the adrenal glands to produce insufficient cortisol. This can be due to damage or destruction of the adrenal cortex. These deficiencies include glucocorticoid and mineralocorticoid hormones as well. These are adrenal dysgenesis (the gland has not formed adequately during development), impaired steroidogenesis (the gland is present but is biochemically unable to produce cortisol), or adrenal destruction (disease processes leading to glandular damage).

Darkening (hyperpigmentation) of the skin, including areas not exposed to the sun – characteristic sites of darkening are skin creases (e.g., of the hands), nipple, and the inside of the cheek (buccal mucosa); also, old scars may darken. This occurs because melanocyte-stimulating hormone (MSH) and ACTH share the same precursor molecule, pro-opiomelanocortin (POMC). After production in the anterior pituitary gland, POMC gets cleaved into gamma-MSH, ACTH, and beta-lipotropin. The subunit ACTH undergoes further cleavage to produce alpha-MSH, the most important MSH for skin pigmentation. In secondary and tertiary forms of adrenal insufficiency, skin darkening does not occur, as ACTH is not overproduced.

=== Adrenal destruction ===
Autoimmune adrenalitis is the most common cause of Addison's disease in the industrialized world as it represents between 68% and 94% of cases. Autoimmune destruction of the adrenal cortex is caused by an immune reaction against the enzyme 21-hydroxylase (a phenomenon first described in 1992). This may be isolated or in the context of autoimmune polyendocrine syndrome (APS type 1 or 2), in which other hormone-producing organs, such as the thyroid and pancreas, may also be affected.

Adrenal destruction is also a feature of adrenoleukodystrophy, and when the adrenal glands are involved in metastasis (seeding of cancer cells from elsewhere in the body, especially lung), hemorrhage (e.g., in Waterhouse–Friderichsen syndrome or antiphospholipid syndrome), particular infections (tuberculosis, histoplasmosis, coccidioidomycosis), or the deposition of abnormal protein in amyloidosis.

=== Adrenal dysgenesis ===
All causes in this category are genetic, and generally very rare. These include mutations to the SF1 transcription factor, congenital adrenal hypoplasia due to DAX-1 gene mutations and mutations to the ACTH receptor gene (or related genes, such as in the Triple-A or Allgrove syndrome). DAX-1 mutations may cluster in a syndrome with glycerol kinase deficiency with a number of other symptoms when DAX-1 is deleted together with a number of other genes.

=== Impaired steroidogenesis ===
To form cortisol, the adrenal gland requires cholesterol, which is then converted biochemically into steroid hormones. Interruptions in the delivery of cholesterol include Smith–Lemli–Opitz syndrome and abetalipoproteinemia. Of the synthesis problems, congenital adrenal hyperplasia is the most common (in various forms: 21-hydroxylase, 17α-hydroxylase, 11β-hydroxylase and 3β-hydroxysteroid dehydrogenase), lipoid CAH due to deficiency of StAR and mitochondrial DNA mutations. Some medications interfere with steroid synthesis enzymes (e.g., ketoconazole), while others accelerate the normal breakdown of hormones by the liver (e.g., rifampicin, phenytoin).

== Diagnosis ==
=== Suggestive features ===
Routine laboratory investigations may show:

- Low blood sugar (worse in children due to loss of glucocorticoid's glucogenic effects)
- Low blood sodium, due to loss of production of the hormone aldosterone, to the kidney's inability to excrete free water in the absence of sufficient cortisol, and also the effect of corticotropin-releasing hormone to stimulate secretion of ADH.
- High blood potassium, due to loss of production of the hormone aldosterone.
- Eosinophilia and lymphocytosis (increased number of eosinophils or lymphocytes, two types of white blood cells)
- Metabolic acidosis (increased blood acidity), also is due to loss of the hormone aldosterone because sodium reabsorption in the distal tubule is linked with acid/hydrogen ion (H^{+}) secretion. Absent or insufficient levels of aldosterone stimulation of the renal distal tubule lead to sodium wasting in the urine and H^{+} retention in the serum.

=== Testing ===
Cortisol

Aldosterone

In suspected cases of Addison's disease, demonstration of low adrenal hormone levels even after appropriate stimulation (called the ACTH stimulation test or synacthen test) with synthetic pituitary ACTH hormone tetracosactide is needed for the diagnosis. Two tests are performed, the short and the long test. Dexamethasone does not cross-react with the assay and can be administered concomitantly during testing.

The short test compares blood cortisol levels before and after 250 micrograms of tetracosactide (intramuscular or intravenous) is given. If one hour later, plasma cortisol exceeds 170 nmol/L and has risen by at least 330 nmol/L to at least 690 nmol/L, adrenal failure is excluded. If the short test is abnormal, the long test is used to differentiate between primary adrenal insufficiency and secondary adrenocortical insufficiency.

The long test uses 1 mg tetracosactide (intramuscular). Blood is taken 1, 4, 8, and 24 hours later. Normal plasma cortisol level should reach 1,000 nmol/L by 4 hours. In primary Addison's disease, the cortisol level is reduced at all stages, whereas in secondary corticoadrenal insufficiency, a delayed but normal response is seen. Other tests may be performed to distinguish between various causes of hypoadrenalism, including renin and adrenocorticotropic hormone levels, as well as medical imaging – usually in the form of ultrasound, computed tomography or magnetic resonance imaging.

Adrenoleukodystrophy, and the milder form, adrenomyeloneuropathy, cause adrenal insufficiency combined with neurological symptoms. These diseases are estimated to be the cause of adrenal insufficiency in about 35% of diagnosed males with idiopathic Addison's disease and should be considered in the differential diagnosis of any male with adrenal insufficiency. Diagnosis is made by a blood test to detect very long-chain fatty acids.

== Treatment ==
=== Maintenance ===
Treatment for Addison's disease involves replacing the missing cortisol, sometimes in the form of hydrocortisone tablets, or prednisone tablets in a dosing regimen that mimics the physiological concentrations of cortisol. Alternatively, one-quarter as much prednisolone may be used for equal glucocorticoid effect as hydrocortisone. Treatment is usually lifelong. In addition, many people require fludrocortisone as a replacement for the missing aldosterone.

People with Addison's are often advised to carry information on them (e.g., in the form of a MedicAlert bracelet or information card) for the attention of emergency medical services personnel who might need to attend to their needs. A needle, syringe, and injectable form of cortisol are also recommended to be carried for emergencies. People with Addison's disease are advised to increase their medication during periods of illness or when undergoing surgery or dental treatment. Immediate medical attention is needed when severe infections, vomiting, or diarrhea occur, as these conditions can precipitate an Addisonian crisis. A person who is vomiting may require injections of hydrocortisone, instead.

Those with low aldosterone levels may also benefit from a high-sodium diet. It may also be beneficial for the people with Addison's disease to increase their dietary intake of calcium and vitamin D. High dosages of corticosteroids are linked to osteoporosis so these may be necessary for bone health. Sources of calcium include dairy products, leafy greens, and fortified flours among many others. Vitamin D can be obtained through the sun, oily fish, red meat, and egg yolks among many others. Though there are many sources to obtain vitamin D through diet, supplements are also an option.

=== Crisis ===
Standard therapy involves intravenous injections of glucocorticoids and large volumes of intravenous saline solution with dextrose (glucose). This treatment usually brings rapid improvement. If intravenous access is not immediately available, intramuscular injection of glucocorticoids can be used. When the person is capable of swallowing fluids and medications by mouth, the amount of glucocorticoids is decreased until a maintenance dose is reached. If aldosterone is deficient, maintenance therapy also includes oral doses of fludrocortisone acetate.

== Prognosis ==
Outcomes are typically good when treated. Most people can expect to live relatively normal lives. Someone with the disease should be observant of symptoms of an "Addison's crisis" while the body is strained, as in rigorous exercise or being sick, the latter often needing emergency treatment with intravenous injections to treat the crisis.

Individuals with Addison's disease have more than a doubled mortality rate. Furthermore, individuals with Addison's disease and diabetes mellitus have an almost four-fold increase in mortality compared to individuals with only diabetes. The risk ratio for cause mortality in males and females is 2.19 and 2.86, respectively.

Death for individuals with Addison's disease often occurs due to cardiovascular disease, infectious disease, and malignant tumors, among other possibilities.

Recent studies indicate that individuals with Addison's disease may have an increased risk of osteoporotic fractures and higher rates of work loss, including sick leave and disability pension.

== Epidemiology ==
The frequency rate of Addison's disease in the human population is sometimes estimated at one in 100,000. Some put the number closer to 40–144 cases per million population (1/25,000–1/7,000). Addison's can affect persons of any age, sex, or ethnicity, but it typically presents in adults between 30 and 50 years of age. Research has shown no significant predispositions based on ethnicity. About 70% of Addison's disease diagnoses occur due to autoimmune reactions, which cause damage to the adrenal cortex.

== History ==
Addison's disease is named after Thomas Addison, the British physician who first described the condition in On the Constitutional and Local Effects of Disease of the Suprarenal Capsules (1855). He originally described it as "melasma suprarenale", but later physicians gave it the medical eponym "Addison's disease" in recognition of Addison's discovery.

While the six patients examined by Addison in 1855 all had adrenal tuberculosis, the term "Addison's disease" does not imply an underlying disease process.

The condition was initially considered a form of anemia associated with the adrenal glands. Because little was known at the time about the adrenal glands (then called "Supra-Renal Capsules"), Addison's monograph describing the condition was an isolated insight. As the adrenal function became better known, Addison's monograph became known as an important medical contribution and a classic example of careful medical observation. Tuberculosis used to be a major cause of Addison's disease and acute adrenal failure worldwide. It remains a leading cause in developing countries today.

United States president John F. Kennedy (1917–1963) suffered from complications of Addison's disease throughout his life, including during his presidency, resulting in fatigue and hyperpigmentation of the face. He is possibly the most famous known case. Helen Reddy also had Addison's disease. The novelist Jane Austen, whose own description of her illness included her turning "every wrong colour", was suggested to have suffered from Addison's by medical historian Zachary Cope.

== Other animals ==
Hypoadrenocorticism is uncommon in dogs, and rare in cats, with less than 40 known feline cases worldwide, since first documented in 1983. Individual cases have been reported in a grey seal, a red panda, a flying fox, and a sloth.

In dogs, hypoadrenocorticism has been diagnosed in many breeds. Vague symptoms, which wax and wane, can cause delay in recognition of the presence of the disease. Female dogs appear more affected than male dogs, though this may not be the case in all breeds. The disease is most often diagnosed in dogs that are young to middle-aged, but it can occur at any age from 4 months to 14 years. Treatment of hypoadrenocorticism must replace the hormones (cortisol and aldosterone) which the dog cannot produce itself. This is achieved either by daily treatment with fludrocortisone, or monthly injections with desoxycorticosterone pivalate (DOCP) and daily treatment with a glucocorticoid, such as prednisone. Several follow-up blood tests are required so the dose can be adjusted until the dog is receiving the correct amount of treatment, because the medications used in the therapy of hypoadrenocorticism can cause excessive thirst and urination if not prescribed at the lowest effective dose. In anticipation of stressful situations, such as staying in a boarding kennel, dogs require an increased dose of prednisone. Lifelong treatment is required, but the prognosis for dogs with hypoadrenocorticism is very good. Michigan State University has conducted a study that explores the process of getting to the lowest effective dose safely. This must be done slowly over time, so that crisis does not occur. Medications should never be suddenly stopped, as this will cause severe medical issues quickly.

Hypoadrenocorticism can also occur in cats but is extremely rare. It is usually caused by an immune reaction, resulting in adrenal insufficiency. An ACTH stimulation test is used to diagnosis the condition.
