= Multinucleate cell angiohistiocytoma =

- Specialty: Dermatology

Multinucleate cell angiohistiocytoma (MCAH) is a cutaneous condition that presents as slowly growing, multiple, discrete but grouped, red to violaceous papules

== Signs and symptoms ==
Lesions are asymptomatic and most commonly found on the face and acral regions, however they have been described in other locations such as the trunk and, less frequently, the mucous membranes; they are usually unilateral and appear as papules ranging in diameter from 2 to 15mm.

They can be smooth and flat, or they can seem like reddish, pink, violaceous, or brown papules with a slightly elevated dome-shaped surface. There have been a few cases reported with bilateral involvement and even widespread forms. MCAH lesions do not seem to spontaneously remit; instead, they grow over weeks to months.

== Causes ==
While there are still many unanswered questions regarding the etiology and pathogenesis of MCAH, the general consensus is that lesions result from a reactive process rather than a neoplastic one.

== Mechanism ==
This disease is thought to be caused by enhanced cutaneous vascularity and an aggressive inflammatory response to intravascular macrophage migration. Furthermore, impacted regions demonstrate an overabundance of estrogen receptor α. Angiogenesis has been associated with estrogen signaling. This discovery may help to explain why MCAH is more common in women and why it is extremely vascular.

== Diagnosis ==
Histopathologically, multinucleated cells with angular outlines in the dermis and vascular hyperplasia linked to a rise in factor XIIIa-positive fibrohistiocytic interstitial cells are the hallmarks of MCAH. The most specific histological finding (3–10 hyperchromatic nuclei with basophilic cytoplasm) is the presence of multinucleated giant cells, albeit this finding does not necessarily indicate the presence of MCAH.

Immunohistochemistry demonstrates that vascular endothelial cells are positive for Factor VIII, vimentin, CD31, and CD34 antibodies, but negative for Bcl-2 and HHV-8 antigens. Vimentin, Factor XIIIa, CD68, alpha-1-antitrypsin, and lysozyme are expressed by mononuclear cells, although neither S100 nor CD1a are. The MAC387 expression is not constant. While multinucleate cells are negative for other monocyte/macrophage lineage markers, they are significantly positive for vimentin. CD68 expression can be either positive or negative. In interstitial and perivascular spindle cells, as well as rarely in multinucleate cells, estrogen receptor α has significant expression.

Angiofibroma/fibrous papule, dermatofibroma, microvenular hemangioma, Kaposi's sarcoma, and acroangiodermatitis are among the histopathologic differential diagnoses.

== Treatment ==
Treatment is not required because the lesion is benign, but it might be suggested for itchy or unappealing lesions. The literature has reported on a number of treatment approaches, such as intense pulsed light, cryosurgery, corticosteroids, argon and carbon dioxide lasers, and surgical excision.

== See also ==
- Mast cell sarcoma
- List of cutaneous conditions
