= Adrenalitis =

- Other names: Adrenitis
- Specialty: Endocrinology

Adrenalitis is the inflammation of one or both adrenal glands, which can lead to an insufficiency of adrenaline or noradrenaline.

Types can include:

- Xanthogranulomatous adrenalitis
- Autoimmune adrenalitis (a major cause of Addison's disease)
- Hemorrhagic adrenalitis
