= Folliculosebaceous cystic hamartoma =

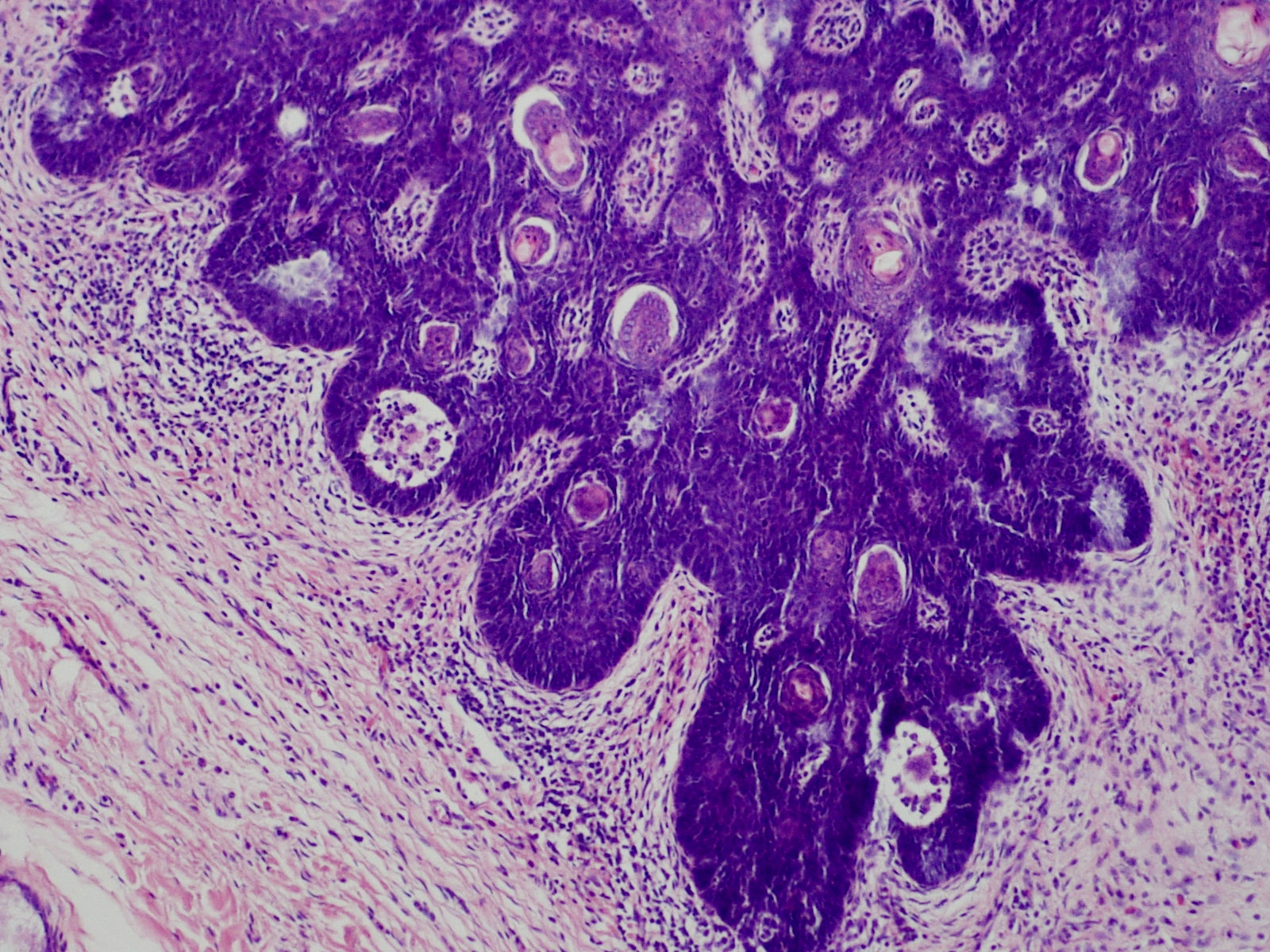
- Adnexoblastic (folliculosebaceous) trichoid hamartoma
- Specialty: Dermatology

Folliculosebaceous cystic hamartoma abbreviated as (FSCH) is a rare cutaneous hamartoma consisting of dilated folliculosebaceous units invested in mesenchymal elements. it typically affects adults, have a predilection for the central face or scalp, with less than 1.5 cm dimension. Clinically, the lesions are asymptomatic, rubbery to firm in consistency, and usually occur on or above the neck in (> 90%) of cases, Histopathologically, FSCH shares several similar features to sebaceous trichofolliculoma, but it is usually possible to differentiate these two tumors.

== Signs and symptoms ==
Folliculosebaceous cystic hamartomas frequently manifests as a flesh-colored papule or nodule that is asymptomatic. Folliculosebaceous cystic hamartomas are usually found on the scalp or central face. The lesions are usually 0.5–1.5 cm flesh-colored, exophytic, solitary, rubbery or firm, and partially umbilicated.

== Diagnosis ==
The typical histopathologic features of folliculosebaceous cystic hamartoma lesions are mesenchymal, follicular, and sebaceous elements; these lesions frequently manifest as sebaceous structures that emerge from a core infundibular cyst that is contained inside the dermis. Mesenchymal alterations are frequently observed throughout the stroma and are characterized by fibrillary bundles of collagen with proliferating adipocytes, as well as a rise in capillaries and tiny venules. There are clefts separating the neighboring dermis from the epithelial component. In the stroma of lesions, immature adipocytes with lipid droplets and spindle- or starry-shaped nuclei have been observed; these cells are frequently located close to the sebaceous formations.

== See also ==
- Basaloid follicular hamartoma
- List of cutaneous conditions
