= Tumor of follicular infundibulum =

- Other names: Infundibuloma, isthmicoma
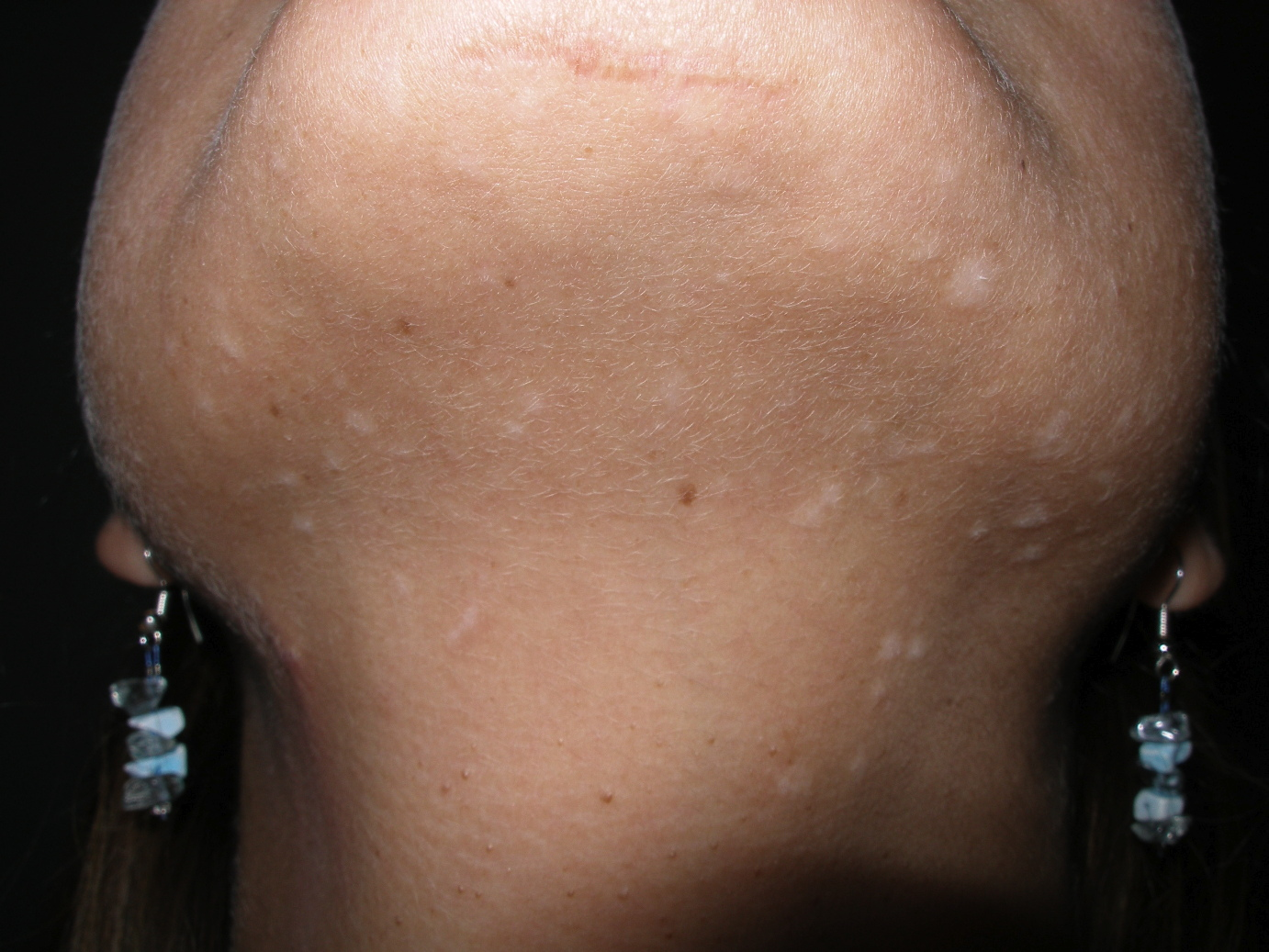
- Macular and slightly papular lesions over the chin, mandibular and anterior cervical region
- Specialty: Dermatology

Tumor of follicular infundibulum, also known as infundibuloma, and isthmicoma is a cutaneous condition characterized by flat, keratotic papules of the head and neck, skin lesions that are usually solitary.

== Additional images ==
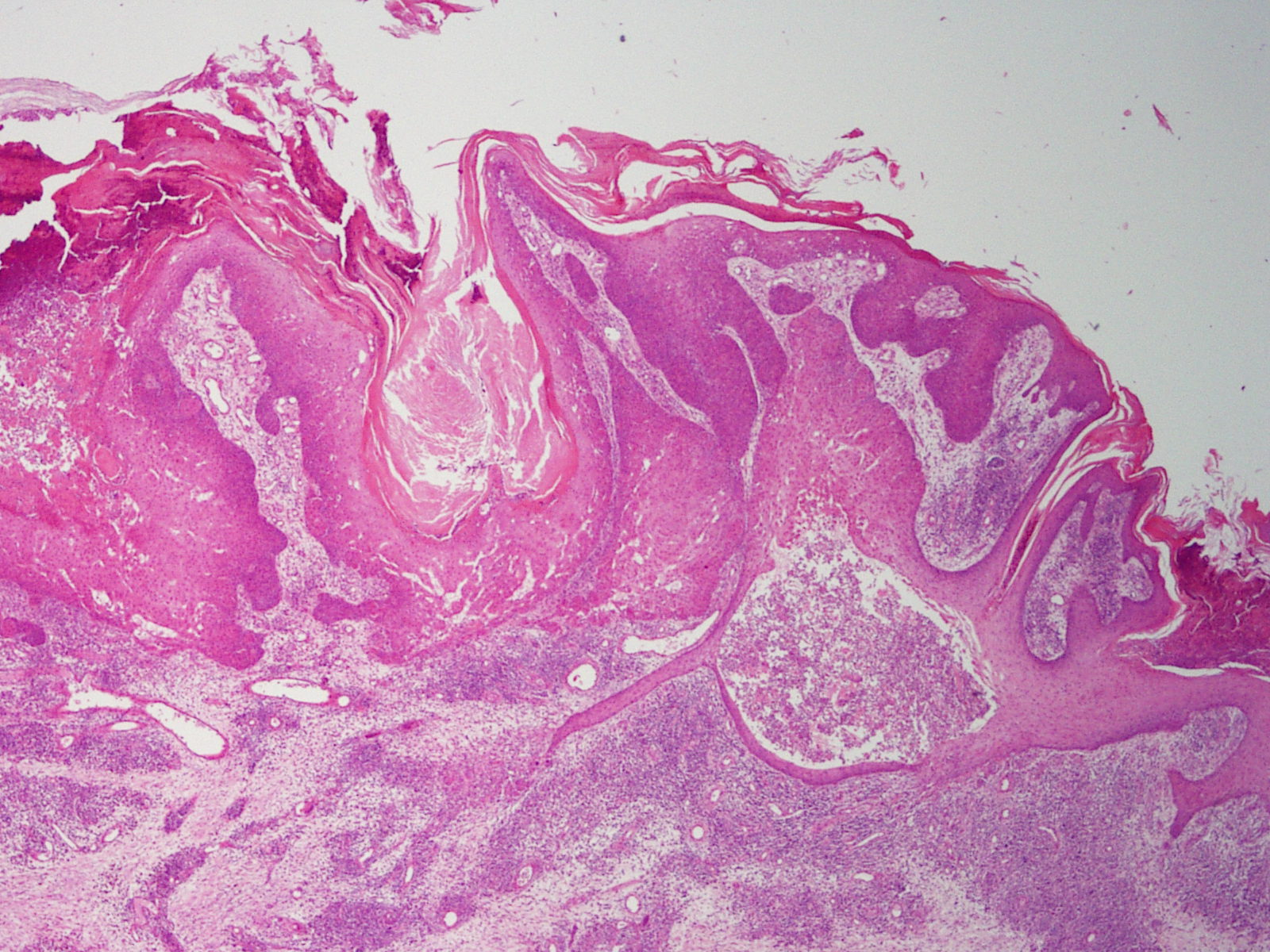
Follicular infundibulum tumor

== See also ==
- Basaloid follicular hamartoma
- List of cutaneous conditions
