= Asymptomatic =

Patient is a carrier for a disease or infection but experiences no symptoms

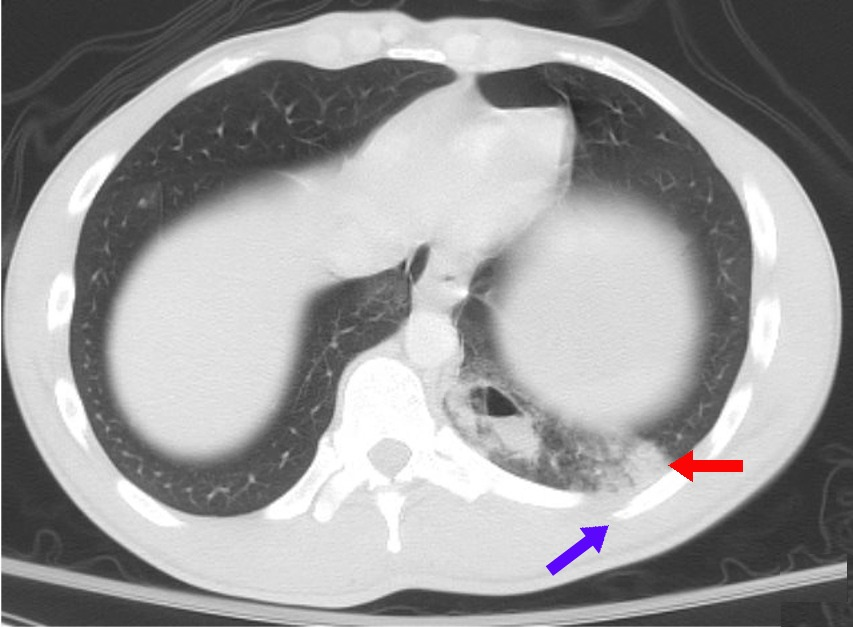
Pulmonary contusion due to trauma is an example of a condition that can be asymptomatic with half of people showing no signs at the initial presentation. The CT scan shows a pulmonary contusion (red arrow) accompanied by a rib fracture (purple arrow).

Asymptomatic (or clinically silent) is an adjective categorising the medical conditions (i.e., injuries or diseases) that patients carry but without experiencing their symptoms, despite an explicit diagnosis (e.g., a positive medical test).

Pre-symptomatic is the adjective categorising the time periods during which the medical conditions are asymptomatic.

Subclinical and paucisymptomatic are other adjectives categorising either the asymptomatic infections (i.e., subclinical infections), or the psychosomatic illnesses and mental disorders expressing a subset of symptoms but not the entire set an explicit medical diagnosis requires.

== Examples ==
An example of an asymptomatic disease is cytomegalovirus (CMV) which is a member of the herpes virus family. "It is estimated that 1% of all newborns are infected with CMV, but the majority of infections are asymptomatic." (Knox, 1983; Kumar et al. 1984) In some diseases, the proportion of asymptomatic cases can be important. For example, in multiple sclerosis it is estimated that around 25% of the cases are asymptomatic, with these cases detected postmortem or just by coincidence (as incidental findings) while treating other diseases.

== Importance ==
Knowing that a condition is asymptomatic is important because:

- It may be contagious, and the contribution of asymptomatic and pre-symptomatic infections to the transmission level of a disease helps set the required control measures to keep it from spreading.
- It is not required that a person undergo treatment. It does not cause later medical problems such as high blood pressure and hyperlipidaemia.
- Be alert to possible problems: asymptomatic hypothyroidism makes a person vulnerable to Wernicke–Korsakoff syndrome or beri-beri following intravenous glucose.
- For some conditions, treatment during the asymptomatic phase is vital. If one waits until symptoms develop, it is too late for survival or to prevent damage.

== Mental health ==
Subclinical or subthreshold conditions are those for which the full diagnostic criteria are not met and have not been met in the past, although symptoms are present. This can mean that symptoms are not severe enough to merit a diagnosis, or that symptoms are severe but do not meet the criteria of a condition.

== List ==
These are conditions for which there is a sufficient number of documented individuals that are asymptomatic that it is clinically noted. For a complete list of asymptomatic infections see subclinical infection.

- Balanitis xerotica obliterans
- Benign lymphoepithelial lesion
- Cardiac shunt
- Carotid artery dissection
- Carotid bruit
- Cavernous hemangioma
- Chloromas (Myeloid sarcoma)
- Cholera
- Chronic myelogenous leukemia
- Coeliac disease
- Coronavirus (common cold germs)
- Coronary artery disease
- COVID-19
- Cowpox
- Diabetic retinopathy
- Essential fructosuria
- Flu or Influenza strains
- Folliculosebaceous cystic hamartoma
- Glioblastoma multiforme (occasionally)
- Glucocorticoid remediable aldosteronism
- Glucose-6-phosphate dehydrogenase deficiency
- Hepatitis
- Hereditary elliptocytosis
- Herpes
- Heterophoria
- Hypertension (high blood pressure)
- Histidinemia
- HIV (AIDS)
- HPV
- Hyperaldosteronism
- hyperlipidaemia
- Hyperprolinemia type I
- Hypothyroidism
- Hypoxia (some cases)
- Idiopathic thrombocytopenic purpura
- Iridodialysis (when small)
- Lesch–Nyhan syndrome (female carriers)
- Levo-Transposition of the great arteries
- Measles
- Meckel's diverticulum
- Microvenular hemangioma
- Mitral valve prolapse
- Monkeypox
- Monoclonal B-cell lymphocytosis
- Myelolipoma
- Nonalcoholic fatty liver disease
- Optic disc pit
- Osteoporosis
- Pertussis (whooping cough)
- Pes cavus
- Poliomyelitis
- Polyorchidism
- Pre-eclampsia
- Prehypertension
- Protrusio acetabuli
- Pulmonary contusion
- Renal tubular acidosis
- Rubella
- Smallpox (extinct since the 1980s)
- Spermatocele
- Sphenoid wing meningioma
- Spider angioma
- Splenic infarction (though not typically)
- Subarachnoid hemorrhage
- Tonsillolith
- Tuberculosis
- Type II diabetes
- Typhus
- Vaginal intraepithelial neoplasia
- Varicella (chickenpox)
- Wilson's disease

Millions of women reported lack of symptoms during pregnancy until the point of childbirth or the beginning of labor and did not know they were pregnant. This phenomenon is known as cryptic pregnancies.

== See also ==
- Symptomatic
- Subclinical infection
