= Acroangiodermatitis =

- Other names: Mali acroangiodermatitis and Pseudo-Kaposi's sarcoma
- Specialty: Dermatology

Acroangiodermatitis of Mali is a rare cutaneous condition often characterized by purplish-blue to brown papules and plaques on the medial and lateral malleolus of both legs.

Acroangiodermatitis is a rare skin condition characterised by hyperplasia of pre-existing vasculature due to venous hypertension from severe chronic venous stasis. It is associated with amputees, haemodialysis (HD) patients with arteriovenous (AV) shunts, and patients with paralysed legs, hepatitis C, chronic venous insufficiency or AV malformations (AVM). Patients present with itchy, painful, confluent, violaceous or brown-black macules, papules or plaques usually at the distal lower limbs. There may be ulceration and bleeding. The histologic features are capillary proliferation and perivascular inflammation involving eosinophils in the dermis with minimal epidermal changes. Management includes compression therapy, wound care and surgical correction of AVM. Dapsone combined with leg elevation and compression, and erythromycin for HD patients with AV fistulas have also been reported. The lesions may persist for years with complications like ulceration, bleeding and infection.

== See also ==
- List of cutaneous conditions
- Skin lesion
