= Microvenular hemangioma =

- Other names: Microcapillary hemangioma
- Specialty: Oncology

Microvenular hemangioma is an acquired benign vascular tumor that presents as an asymptomatic, slowly growing, 0.5- to 2.0 cm reddish lesion on the forearms or other sites of young to middle-aged adults. The cause of microvenular hemangioma is unknown, however it has been associated with immunosuppression.

== Signs and symptoms ==
Microvenular hemangioma appears as slow-growing, frequently numerous lesions, erythematous, violaceous, or moderately pruriginous macules, papules, or nodules without any symptoms. They usually appear on the forearm. There have also been reports of lesions on the soles of the feet, forehead, legs, and chest.

== Causes ==
Although the exact cause of microvenular hemangioma is uncertain, it has been found in certain instances during pregnancy or after changes in hormonal contraception. In certain circumstances, imbalanced sex hormones could potentially be the cause. Microvenular hemangioma has also been associated with immunosuppression.

== Diagnosis ==
Multiple distinct red globules are seen under a microscope, and a finely pigmented network is seen around the periphery. Histologically, microvenular hemangioma is made up of venules with thin walls that branch erratically and have barely noticeable vascular lumina. The dermis's collagen bundles are thickened. Pericytes envelop the endothelial cells, which can exhibit a combination of plump and flat cells without pleomorphism or mitotic patterns.

Immunohistochemically, an microvenular hemangioma's endothelial cells show positive staining for CD31, CD34, and factor VIII, while its pericytes show positive staining for SMA. However, neither cell shows positive staining for podoplanin.

The differential diagnosis for microvenular hemangioma includes acquired (tufted) angioma, Kaposi sarcoma, Kaposiform hemangioendothelioma, and sclerosing hemangioma.

== Treatment ==
The treatment for microvenular hemangioma is surgical excision.

== See also ==
- Hemangioma
- List of cutaneous conditions
