= Myelolipoma =

- Other names: myolipoma
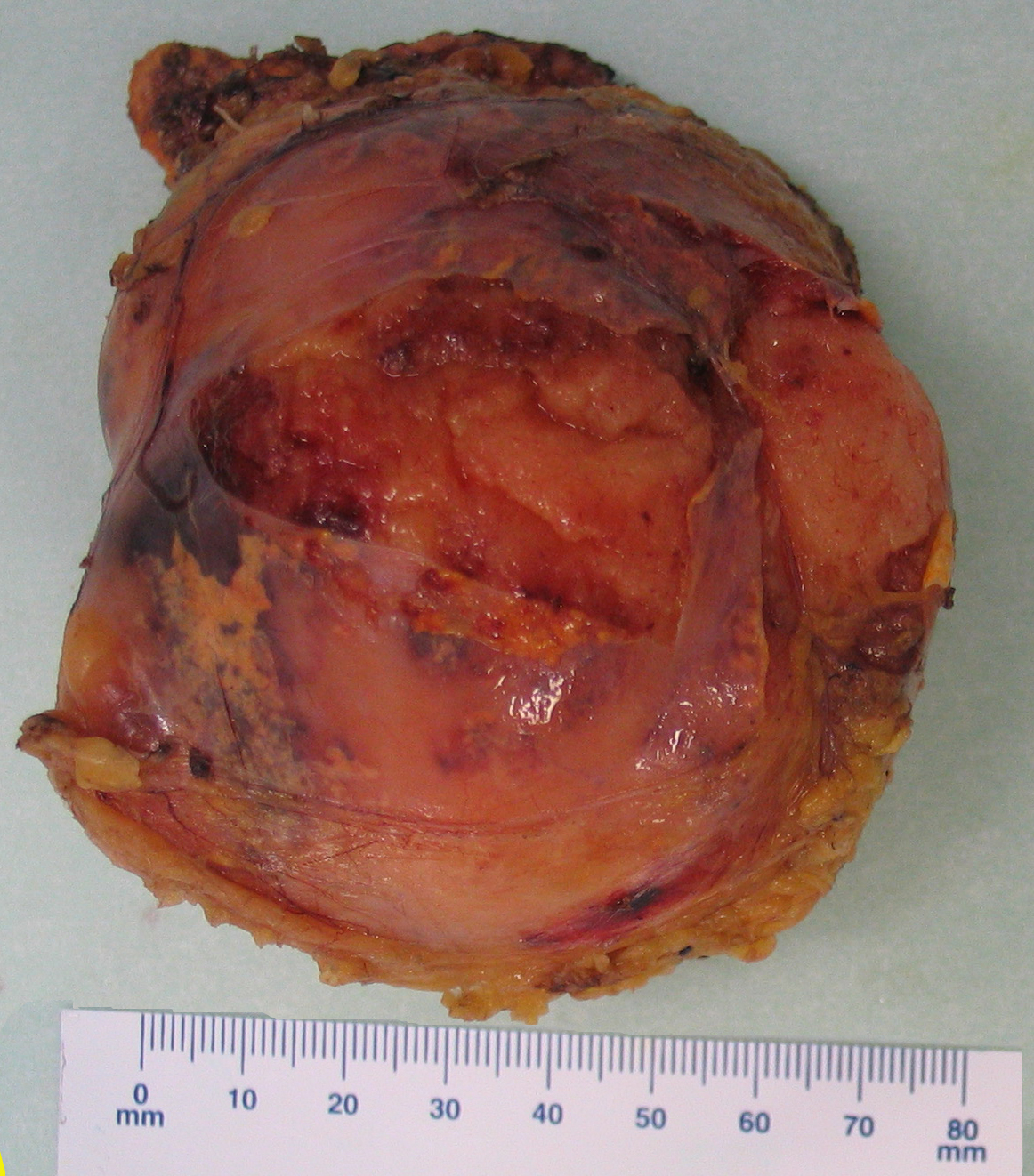
- An adrenal myelolipoma
- Specialty: Oncology

Myelolipoma (myelo-, from the Ancient Greek μυελός 'marrow'; lipo, 'of, or pertaining to, fat'; -oma 'tumor or mass'; also myolipoma) is a benign tumor-like lesion composed of mature adipose (fat) tissue and haematopoietic (blood-forming) elements in various proportions.

Myelolipomas can present in the adrenal gland, or outside of the gland.

== Signs and symptoms ==
The majority of myelolipomas are asymptomatic. Most do not produce any adrenal hormones. Most are only discovered as a result of investigation for another problem.

When myelolipomas do produce symptoms, it is usually because they have become large, and are pressing on other organs or tissues nearby. Symptoms include pain in the abdomen or flank, blood in the urine, a palpable lump or high blood pressure.

As they are benign tumors, myelolipomas do not spread to other body parts. Larger myelolipomas are at risk of localised tissue death and bleeding, which may cause a retroperitoneal haemorrhage.

== Causes ==
Although several hypotheses have been proposed as to the cause of myelolipoma, the causative process is still not clearly understood. Recent experimental evidence suggests that both the myeloid and lipomatous elements have a monoclonal origin, which strongly supports the hypothesis that myelolipomas are neoplastic lesions.

Older theories proposing a non-neoplastic origin include the following:

- Adrenal cortical cells, or other cells within the stroma of the adrenal cortex that are able to differentiate, may reversibly change into fat or blood-forming cells. This might occur because of the actions of adrenal cortex hormones, or of hormones released by the pituitary gland that act on the adrenal glands, such as adrenocorticotropic hormone (ACTH).
- The blood-forming cells may arise by differentiation of cells within the capillaries of the adrenal gland.
- Myelolipoma simply represents a site of normal blood formation outside the bone marrow.

== Pathology ==
=== Macroscopic features ===
Myelolipomas are usually found to occur alone in one adrenal gland, but not both. They can vary widely in size, from as small as a few millimetres to as large as 34 centimeters in diameter. The cut surface has colours varying from yellow to red to mahogany brown, depending on the distribution of fat, blood, and blood-forming cells. The cut surface of larger myelolipomas may contain haemorrhage or infarction.

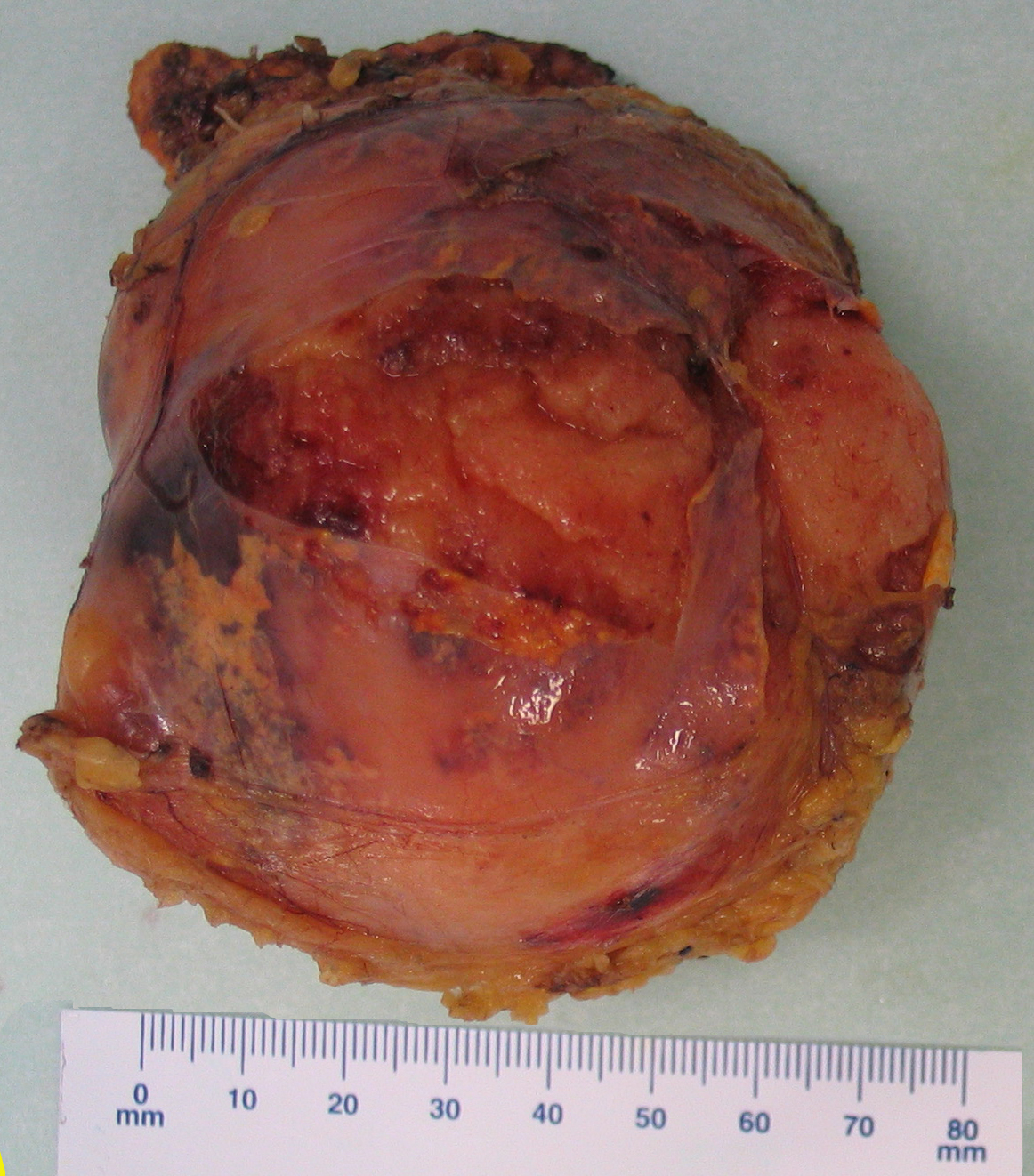
A macroscopic photograph of an adrenal myelolipoma. A remnant of the adrenal gland can be seen at the top

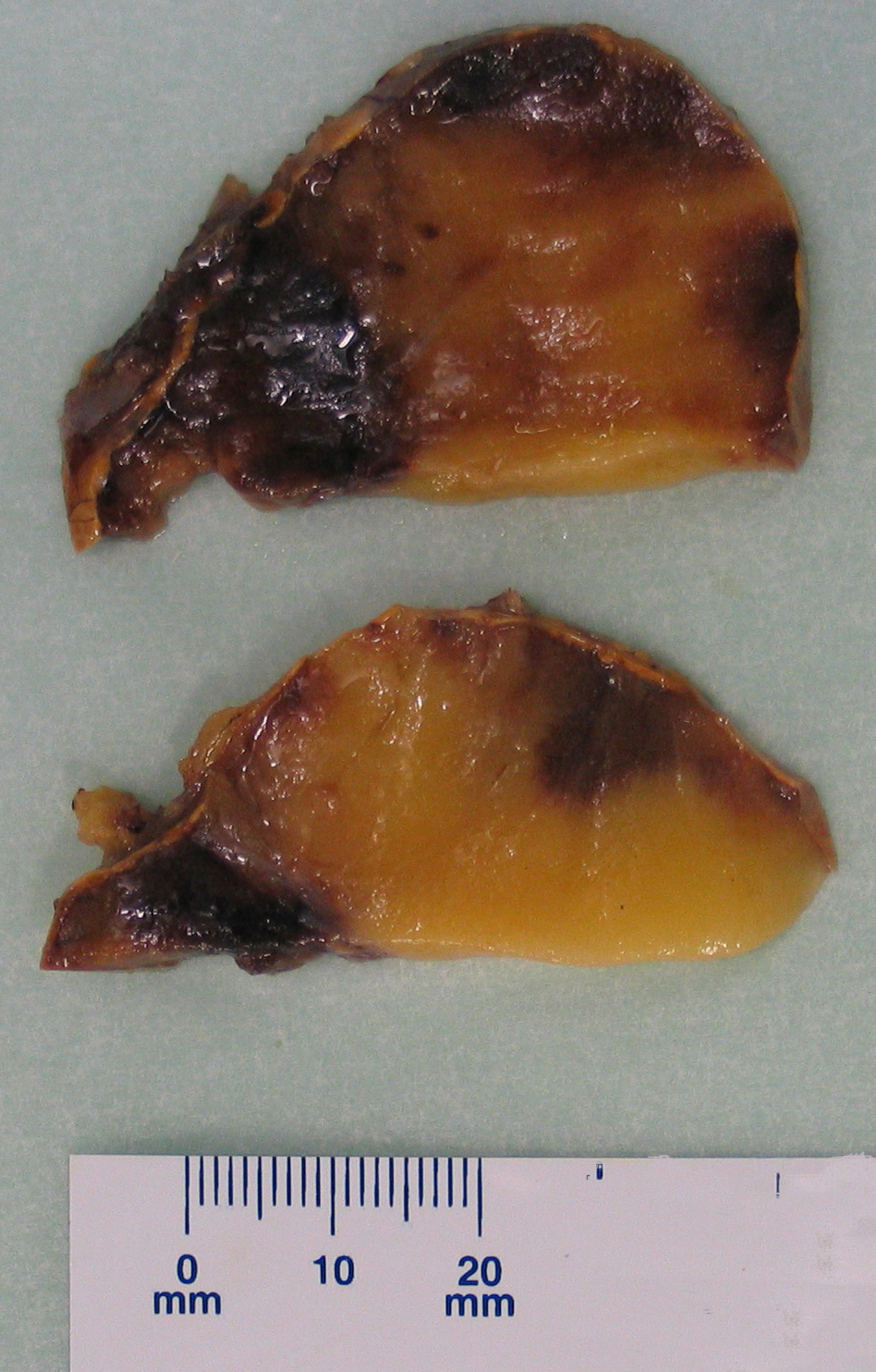
The cut surface shows colour variegation from yellow to red to brown depending on the distribution of fat, blood and myeloid elements

=== Microscopic features ===
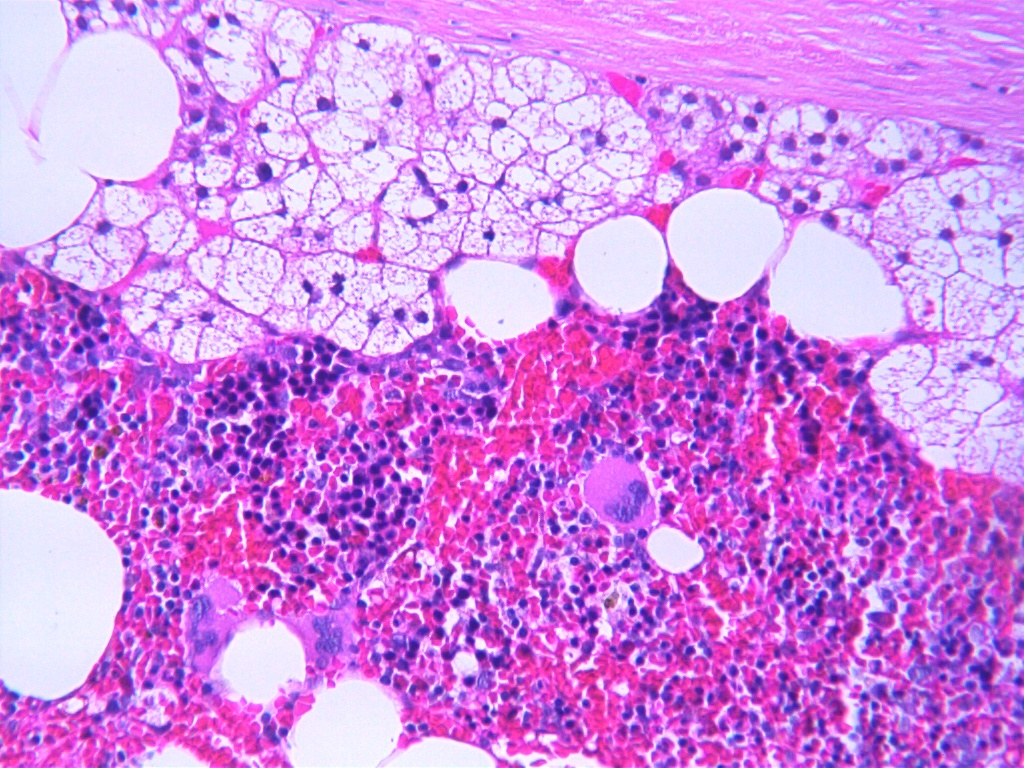
The microscopic view of a myelolipoma shows the presence of normal adrenal cells, fat (adipose) cells, and the three lineages of the myeloid precursors

The typical microscopic features of myelolipomas are shown in the image. There is a mixture of normal adrenal tissue, fat, and a full trilineage maturation of the three major blood-forming elements: myeloid (white blood cell forming), erythroid (red blood cell forming), and megakaryocytic (platelet forming) lines.

== Diagnosis ==
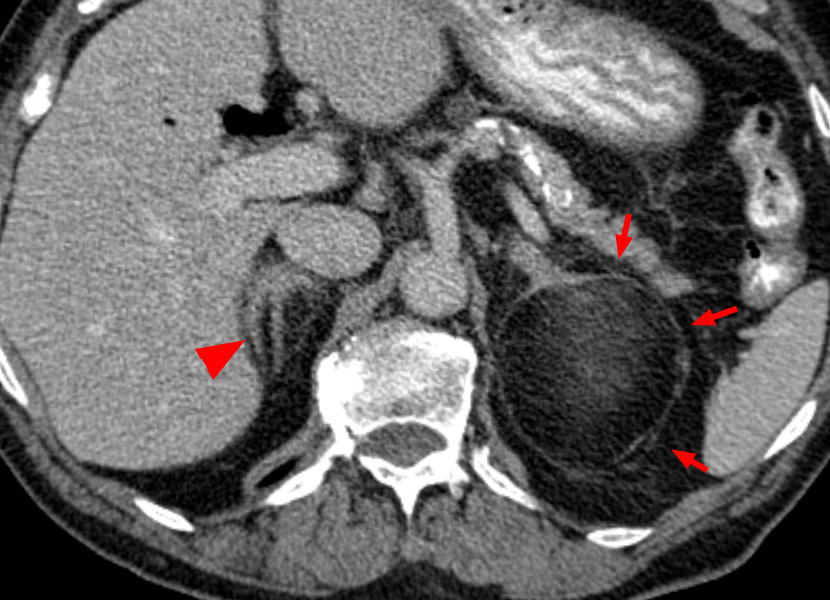
Myeloplipoma shown on a CT scan image

Most myelolipomas are unexpected findings on CT scans and MRI scans of the abdomen. They may sometimes be seen on plain X-ray films.

Fine needle aspiration may be performed to obtain cells for microscopic diagnosis.

== Treatment ==
Small myelolipomas generally do not produce symptoms, and do not require treatment. Ongoing surveillance of these lesions by a doctor is recommended. Surgical excision (removal) is recommended for large myelolipomas because of the risk of bleeding complications.

== Epidemiology ==
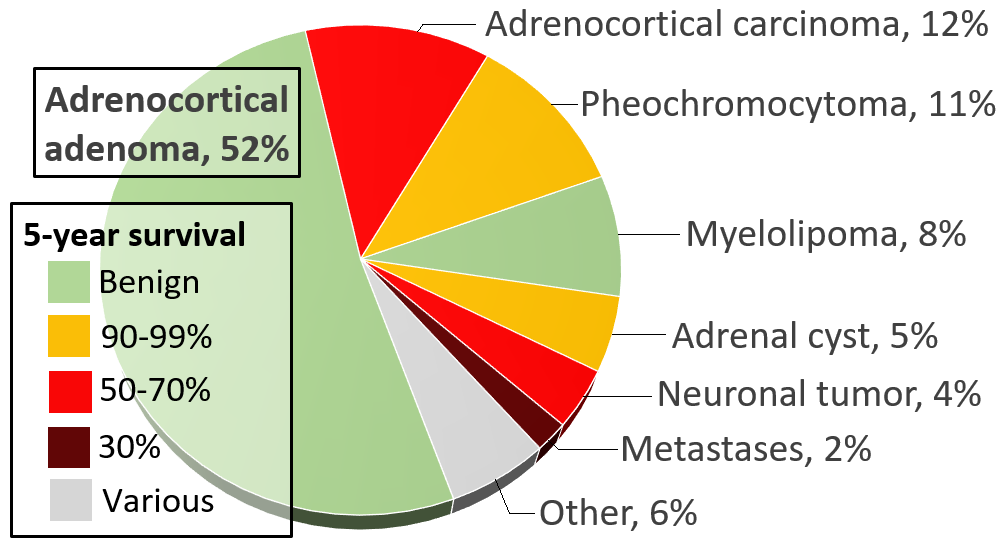
Incidences and prognoses of adrenal tumors, with myelolipoma at right.

Myelolipomas are rare. They have been reported to be found unexpectedly at autopsy in 0.08% to 0.4% of cases (i.e.: somewhere between 8 per 10,000 and 4 per 1,000 autopsies). They most commonly occur in the adrenal gland, and comprise about 8% of all adrenal tumours. They may also occur in other sites, such as the mediastinum, the liver and the gastrointestinal tract.

There is no gender predilection, males and females are affected equally. The peak age range at diagnosis is between 40 and 79 years of age.
