= MedicAlert =

American company providing medical tags

MedicAlert Foundation
- Type: Nonprofit membership organization
- Industry: Healthcare informatics
- Founded: 1956
- Founder: Marion Collins, Chrissie Collins
- Headquarters: Turlock, California, United States
- Area served: Worldwide
- Revenue: 15,098,092 United States dollar (2011)
- Total assets: 24,326,392 United States dollar (2011)
- Number of employees: 130
- Divisions: 9 overseas affiliates
- Website: www.medicalert.org

The MedicAlert Foundation is a non-profit company founded in 1956 and headquartered in Turlock, California. It maintains a database of members' medical information that is made available to medical authorities in the event of a medical emergency. Members supply critical medical data to the organization and receive a distinctive metal bracelet or necklace tag which is worn at all times. It can be used by first responders, such as emergency medical personnel or law-enforcement agents, to access wearers' medical history and special medical needs.

The name MedicAlert may be interpreted either as the two separate words "medic alert" or as a blended form of the phrase "medical alert".

== Protocol and publicity ==
The MedicAlert IDs worn by members are designed to mimic regular jewelry (such as bracelets, necklaces, ID tags, etc.) with the addition of the distinctive MedicAlert engraved tag. The personalized jewelry bears the words "Medic Alert" and the Staff of Asclepius, the universal symbol of the medical profession, on the obverse side, and important medical information and a personalized MedicAlert ID number on the back of the tag. Medical personnel can call the MedicAlert 24-hour Emergency Hotline and provide the ID number on the back of the ID to get more detailed medical information on the member.

Members' conditions and allergies are reviewed by medically trained staff and prioritized in the order of importance that an emergency health professional would assess a patient. The prioritized conditions are then transferred onto a members emblem and wallet card, while more detailed information is contained at MedicAlert ready to pass on in an emergency situation.

While IDs may change depending on country and availability, the two main MedicAlert IDs are bracelets and necklaces, the former being the most popular. MedicAlert has teamed up with Citizen Watch Co. to provide a line of watches that include the Citizen Watch Co. Eco-Drive watch with the customized engraving and logo of MedicAlert.

In the 1980s the IDs were publicized in conjunction with the insurance industry, The Epilepsy Foundation, and The American Diabetes Association, amongst other foundations. Celebrities also participated in the campaign (including comedian Carol Burnett, whose bracelet is symbolically the one-millionth).

== Common medical conditions ==
The medical conditions and prescriptions covered include, but are not limited to:

- Adrenal insufficiency
- Allergies (food, latex, insects, seasonal, environmental etc.)
- Alzheimer's disease
- Asthma
- Autism
- Diabetes
- Epilepsy
- Heart disease
- Hemophilia
- Hypertension
- Drug-induced long QT syndrome
- Medications with serious interactions, e.g. MAOIs and Lamotrigine
- Parkinson's disease
- Devices/implants (artificial heart valves, pacemaker)

The MedicAlert Foundation of Australia permits organ donation directions to be engraved on their IDs.

== Advance directives ==
An advance directive covers specific directives as to the course of treatment that is to be taken by caregivers should the patient be unable to give informed consent due to incapacity. In the United States, MedicAlert keeps signed advance directives, which can be provided to first responders and medical personnel when they contact MedicAlert. A common advance directive is a do not resuscitate order which states that member has requested that resuscitation should not be attempted if the member suffers cardiac or respiratory arrest.

== International affiliates ==
MedicAlert has international affiliates in nine countries.

- United States
- Australia
- Canada
- Cyprus
- Iceland
- Malaysia
- New Zealand
- South Africa
- United Kingdom
- Zimbabwe
