= Basaloid follicular hamartoma =

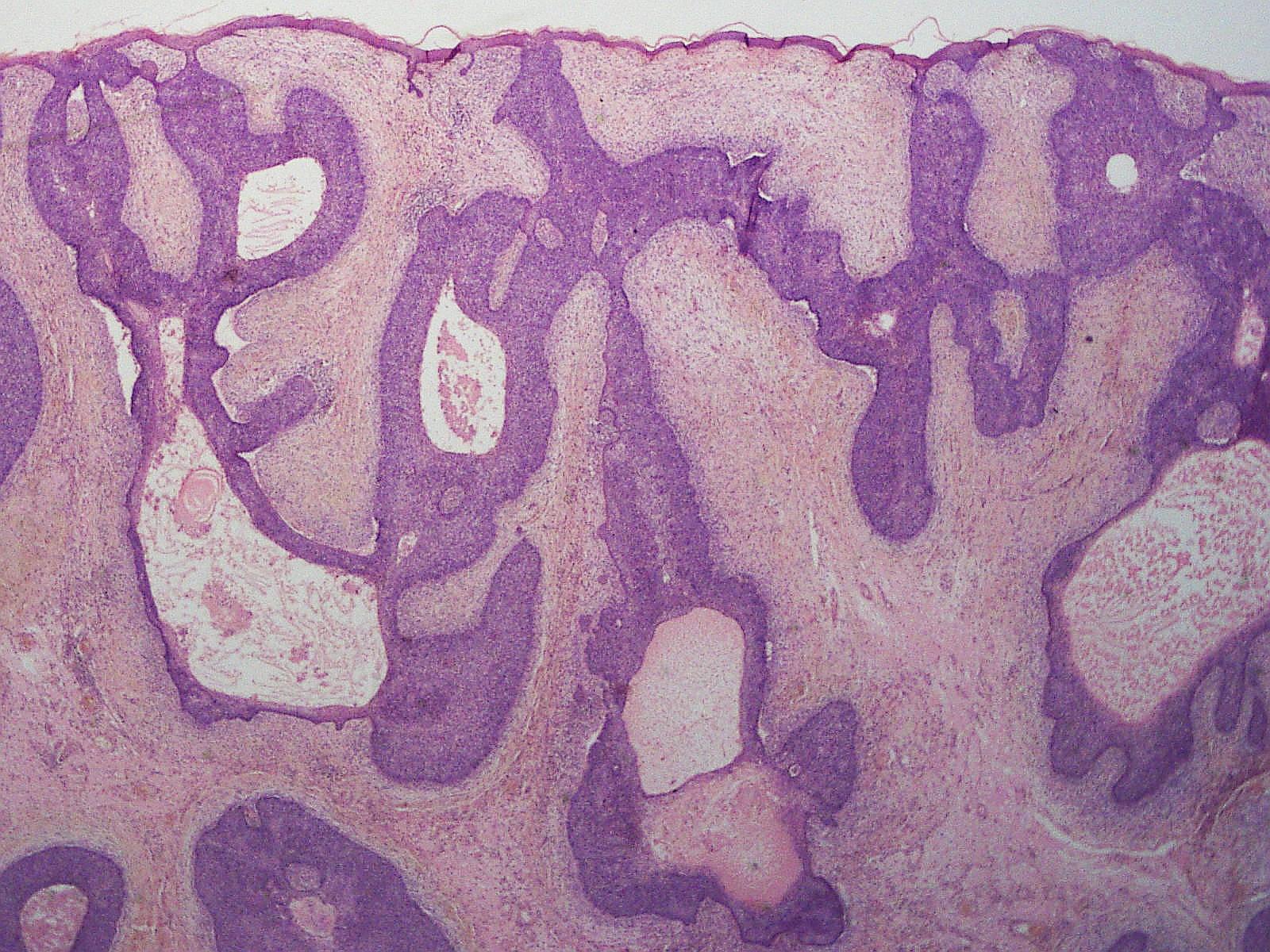
- Basaloid hamartoma
- Specialty: Dermatology

Basaloid follicular hamartoma is a cutaneous condition characterized as distinctive benign adnexal tumor that has several described variants. It manifest as small tan or brown coloured papules in the trunk, pubic area, face, scalp, and axilla.

Basaloid follicular hamartoma is associated with a variety of disorders and is caused by mutation in the PTCH gene. The diagnosis is made based on histopathological examination.

== Signs and symptoms ==
Basaloid follicular hamartoma manifests as multiple 1- to 2mm tan-to-brown-colored papules located on the pubic area, trunk, axilla, scalp, and face.

== Causes ==
Basaloid follicular hamartoma can be hereditary or acquired.

Associated conditions include cystic fibrosis, systemic lupus erythematosus, myasthenia gravis, hypohidrosis, hypotrichosis, palmar pitting, and alopecia.

Basaloid follicular hamartoma is caused by a mutation in the chromosome 9q23 patch (PTCH) gene, which is also the gene responsible for nevoid basal cell carcinoma syndrome.

== Diagnosis ==
The diagnosis of basaloid follicular hamartoma lesions requires a histopathological investigation. Histopathological features include basaloid epithelial cells in the papillary dermis form multifocal islands and branching cords, some of which are attached to the epidermis and dilated hair follicles.

== Treatment ==
Various interventions, including photodynamic therapy, carbon dioxide laser, and surgery, have been suggested.

== See also ==
- Hamartoma
- Cutaneous condition
- List of cutaneous conditions
